= Bank of America Plaza =

Bank of America Plaza may refer to:

- Bank of America Plaza (Los Angeles), California
- Bank of America Plaza (Atlanta), Georgia
- Bank of America Plaza (Charlotte), North Carolina
- Bank of America Plaza (Chicago), Illinois
- Bank of America Plaza (Dallas), Texas
- Bank of America Plaza (Fort Lauderdale), Florida
- Bank of America Plaza (Nashville), Tennessee
- Bank of America Plaza (New York City), New York (now known as 335 Madison Avenue)
- Bank of America Plaza (St. Louis), Missouri
- Bank of America Plaza (San Antonio), Texas
- Bank of America Plaza (Tampa), Florida
- Bank of America Plaza (Tucson), Arizona

== See also ==
- Bank of America Building (disambiguation)
- Bank of America Center (disambiguation)
- Bank of America Tower (disambiguation)
