= Downtown Phoenix =

Central business district of Phoenix, Arizona

Downtown Phoenix from Westward Ho c. 1940

Washington St. and Central Avenue looking north in the 1930s

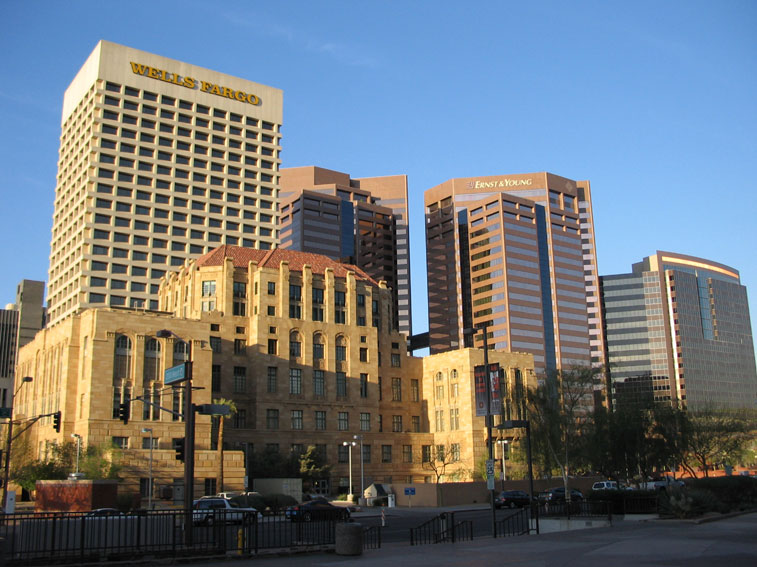
Downtown Phoenix with skyscrapers in 2006

Downtown Phoenix is the central business district (CBD) of the City of Phoenix, Arizona, United States. It is in the heart of the Phoenix metropolitan area or Valley of the Sun. Phoenix, being the county seat of Maricopa County and the capital of Arizona, serves as the center of politics, justice and government on the local, state and federal levels. The area is a major center of employment for the region, with many financial, legal, and other national and international corporations housed in a variety of skyscrapers. Major arts and cultural institutions also call the area home. Downtown Phoenix is a center of major league sports activities, live concert events, and is an equally prominent center of banking and finance in Arizona.

The City of Phoenix defines Downtown as the area between 7th Street and 7th Avenue, from McDowell Road on the north to Buckeye Road on the south. However, the majority of downtown development is concentrated in the smaller area surrounding the intersection of Washington Street and Central Avenue (which is the point of origin of Phoenix street addresses and numbering).

West of 7th Avenue, the majority of office buildings, especially along Washington, house various agencies and departments of the state government of Arizona, and that area up to 19th Avenue is generally considered the Arizona State Capitol Complex. Washington itself splits off at 15th Avenue, with westbound traffic continuing on Adams Street and eastbound traffic on Jefferson. Those streets, and 17th Avenue, are the boundaries of Wesley Bolin Memorial Plaza, with the historic State Capitol building and the more recent Executive Office Building immediately west.

== History ==
=== Early Downtown ===
In 1870, a meeting was held to select a town site for the influx of pioneers coming to the recently recognized town of Phoenix. 320 acres were purchased for $50 raised by popular subscription. This original site, the whole of the town of Phoenix in that day, encompasses what would presently be the Downtown Core, bordered by Van Buren Street south to Jackson Street, and Seventh Street to Seventh Avenue.

With the first survey of the new town, streets were laid out in a grid, with Washington Street as the main east–west thoroughfare. The north–south streets originally bore Native American tribal names, but were changed to more easily remembered numbers, with everything east of Center Street (later Central Avenue) named as streets and everything west as avenues. The town continued to grow, and was eventually incorporated as a city on February 28, 1881, centered around downtown.

Throughout the 1880s the newly incorporated city made many strides toward modernization with the construction of one of the first electric plants in the West as well as the opening of the horse-drawn streetcar line. The Phoenix Street Railway system was eventually electrified and expanded to several different lines that connected Downtown Phoenix to other neighborhoods and cities in the Valley. Independence Day of 1887 heralded the arrival first Southern Pacific train. This opened up the economy of the young city, as goods now flowed in and out by train as opposed to wagon. As Phoenix became the center of commerce in the territory, the capital was moved to Phoenix.

=== Downtown growth ===
After Arizona was granted statehood in 1912, the growth of Phoenix exploded from the downtown epicenter. By the 1930s, a modern skyline composed of various commercial buildings began to take shape and Downtown was a dense, compact and pedestrian friendly city characterized by Victorian buildings and ground-floor retail. Post-World War II building focused heavily on suburb creation, and this, combined with the rise of the automobile and evaporative cooling, resulted in large population relocation outside of Downtown.

=== Redevelopment ===
As Phoenix began to recover from the Great Recession, interest in re-energizing the urban core skyrocketed. In contrast to the pre-recession construction boom in the Phoenix area which primarily focused on the construction of low density communities and suburban office complexes, the most recent boom has been heavily focused on Central Phoenix, with the construction of higher density development, and a renewed interest in local business, bioscience, education, and the arts. Spurred by Arizona State University's quickly developing Downtown Campus and a new Convention Center, Downtown Phoenix has quickly transformed into an attractive place for businesses. Areas such as Lower Grand, Roosevelt, and the Warehouse District have seen a massive investment in art, adaptive reuse, and local restaurants.

== Demographics ==
Downtown Phoenix – Racial and ethnic composition. Note: the US Census treats Hispanic/Latino as an ethnic category. This table excludes Latinos from the racial categories and assigns them to a separate category. Hispanics/Latinos may be of any race.
Race / Ethnicity (NH = Non-Hispanic)	Pop 2000	Pop 2010	Pop 2020	% 2000	% 2010	% 2020
White alone (NH)	5,232	6,471	9,199	28.33%	36.99%	42.37%
Black or African American alone (NH)	1,780	2,240	2,930	9.64%	12.80%	13.50%
Native American or Alaska Native alone (NH)	588	513	555	3.18%	2.93%	2.56%
Asian alone (NH)	137	264	641	0.74%	1.51%	2.95%
Native Hawaiian or Pacific Islander alone (NH)	12	28	41	0.06%	0.16%	0.19%
Other race alone (NH)	15	29	118	0.08%	0.17%	0.54%
Mixed race or Multiracial (NH)	195	331	773	1.06%	1.89%	3.56%
Hispanic or Latino (any race)	10,507	7,619	7,453	56.90%	43.55%	34.33%
Total	18,466	17,495	21,710	100.00%	100.00%	100.00%

Historical population
Census	Pop.	Note	%±
2000	18,466		—
2010	17,495		−5.3%
2020	21,710		24.1%
U.S. Decennial Census

Downtown Phoenix has many points of interest, including museums, sports venues, performing arts venues and a thriving art scene.

=== Museums and cultural venues ===
Downtown's museum and cultural attractions include the Arizona Science Center, The Wells Fargo History Museum, the Phoenix Art Museum, the Rosson House Museum, the Arizona Latino Arts and Cultural Center, the Children's Museum of Phoenix and the Phoenix Center for the Arts.

=== Universities and education ===
Arizona State University, the University of Arizona, Northern Arizona University and GateWay Community College all own buildings and have a presence in downtown.

=== Sports ===
Downtown Phoenix has a large sports presence. Chase Field is home to the Arizona Diamondbacks. It was the site of the Insight Bowl from 2001 to 2005 and hosted the 2006 World Baseball Classic and international soccer games.

Mortgage Matchup Center is home to the Phoenix Suns, Phoenix Mercury and Arizona Rattlers. The ECHL's Phoenix RoadRunners played there from 2005 to 2009. It hosted the NBA All-Star game on February 15, 2009.

Downtown Phoenix has hosted many major sporting events in recent years. Downtown was the site of the 2015 Super Bowl XLIX Central and NFL Experience, which drew over one million people to the city center. In March 2017, Phoenix hosted the 2017 NCAA Final Four Championship, drawing over 400,000 people to Margaret T. Hance Park and other associated downtown entertainment venues.

=== Performing arts ===
Phoenix Symphony Hall is home to the Phoenix Symphony. The Tucson-based Arizona Opera has staged many of its productions in Phoenix at Symphony Hall. Ballet Arizona also stages many of its productions at Symphony Hall.

The Orpheum Theater originally built as a grand movie house in 1927, had undergone a 12-year, $14 million extensive renovation ending in 2002. The theater now stages everything from beauty pageants to Broadway shows.

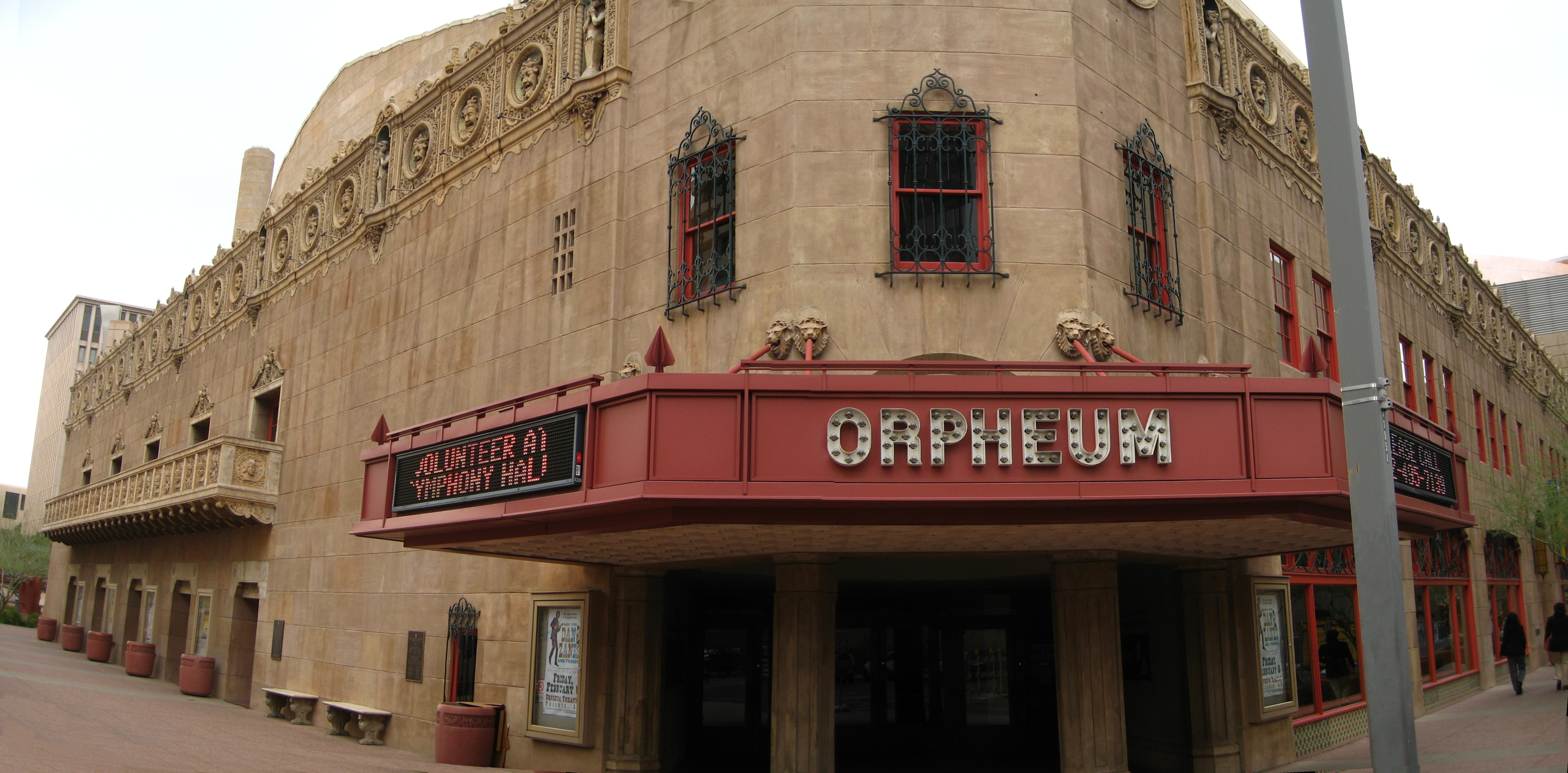
Orpheum Theater

The Herberger Theater Center was built in 1989, has three stages and is home to 3 resident companies: Actors Theater, Arizona Theater Company and Center Dance Ensemble.

The Arizona Financial Theatre, a Live Nation venue, is a state of the art entertainment venue designed specifically for concerts, Broadway shows, family stage shows, and boxing. Originally known as Dodge Theatre before the primary sponsorship changed in 2010, the facility seats up to 5,000 people.

Opening in 2017, The Van Buren is Phoenix’s newest concert venue. Originally opened by valley theater owner Charlie Levy and bought out by Live Nation in 2021.

=== Visitor and information centers ===
Downtown has two main visitor and information centers. Downtown Phoenix, located at 2 E. Washington Street runs Downtown's Business Improvement District and is open daily Monday – Saturday, 8:00am – 8:00pm. Visit Phoenix operates a citywide visitor and tourist center within the Downtown Phoenix Convention Center.

=== Notable buildings and landmarks ===
Luhrs Building & Tower – Located on Central and Jefferson Avenue, the Luhrs Building was completed in 1924 and was Downtown's first 10-story high rise. In 1929, a second phase of the development resulted in the completion of a 14-story Art Deco tower with Spanish Colonial and Southwest influences. Both buildings have been preserved and house office, restaurants and retail businesses.

Hanny's – Opened in 1947, Hanny's was the number one location for men's clothing and fashion until closure in 1986. The building now houses an upscale restaurant and cocktail bar.

The Professional Building (Hilton Garden Inn) – Built in 1932 as the headquarters for Valley Bank and the Maricopa County Medical Society, the building provided Phoenix's first medical offices until the bank took over the entire building in 1939. It is the largest limestone sheathed building in Arizona.

Maricopa County Courthouse (Historic City Hall) – The existing building served as the City Hall from 1928 to 1994 when the "New" City Hall was completed across the street. The building is an excellent example of Renaissance Revival architecture.

The San Carlos – Constructed in 1927, The San Carlos hotel opened its doors on March 19, 1928, as the first hotel in Phoenix with evaporative cooling. The site was previously the location of the first school house in Phoenix. Major celebrities have stayed in the hotel, including Betty Grable, Mae West, Clark Gable and Marilyn Monroe. The hotel now has 12 suites named in honor of its famous visitors and remains a working hotel.

The Heard Building – When completed in 1920, the Heard building was Downtown's tallest structure and was financed by Dwight B. Heard, a finance and publishing executive. Since completion, it has housed the Arizona Republic newspaper, a radio station and many office and ground-floor restaurant tenants.

St. Mary's Basilica – Built in Romanesque/Mission Revival style, St. Mary's Basilica is the oldest Catholic parish in Phoenix and the second oldest church in Phoenix. Construction began in its first phase in 1880 and the building and grounds were placed onto the National Register of Historic Places in 1978.

Chase Field – Opened in 1998, Chase Field is the first stadium built in the U.S. with a retractable roof over natural grass and is the home of the Arizona Diamondbacks Baseball team.

Alwun House – Home of the Alwun House Foundation, this historic building located in the Garfield neighborhood serves as a nonprofit alternative/contemporary art gallery. The foundation was the recipient of a 2013 Governor's Arts Award in the community category.

== Architecture ==
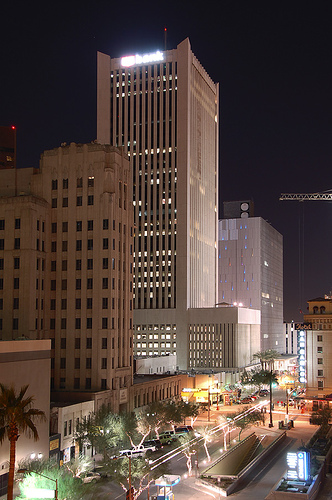
Downtown Phoenix at night

Over twenty-five high-rise buildings ranging up to 40 stories tall pierce the skyline. Three of the five tallest skyscrapers in the state of Arizona are in Downtown Phoenix. Chase Tower, at 40 stories and a height of 483 feet (147 m), is the tallest. U.S. Bank Center's 31 floors and 407 feet (124 m) tall is number two. 44 Monroe, at 34 floors and a height of 380 feet (120 m) is Phoenix's fourth tallest. The Freeport-McMoRan Center tops out at 26 floors and is 116.7 meters (382 ft) tall. The bottom floors of the tower contain a luxury Westin hotel.

The architecture of Downtown offers many examples of 20th-century architectural styles including the Beaux Arts-style Security Building and Hotel San Carlos. Art Deco design can be seen in Luhrs Tower, Hilton Garden Inn (formerly the Professional Building and the Hotel Monroe) and the Orpheum Lofts. International Style was popular from the 1960s to the 1980s and prime examples include Chase Tower and U.S. Bank Center. The short-lived brutalist style has only one example in downtown Phoenix in 100 West Washington. Post modern, with its return to architectural ornamentation, can be seen in the Bank of America Tower, both towers at the Arizona Center and, most notably, in the crown of the Phoenix City Hall Building.

The recent trend of urban living has led to the conversion of the 1930s-era Phoenix Title and Trust building to condominiums called Orpheum Lofts; as well as the newly built residential towers 44 Monroe. Taylor Place, two 13-story towers which serve as the new residential community of the Downtown campus of Arizona State University, opened in August 2008. A 19-story, 320 room Courtyard and Residence Inn by Marriott opened May 2017 and a new Block 23 Fry's urban grocery and mixed-use high-rise is now open.

== Historic Heritage Square ==
Historic Heritage Square is part of Heritage and Science Park on the east end of downtown. It encompasses the only remaining group of residential structures from the original town site of Phoenix.

The Lath House Pavilion, although completed in 1980, its design is heavily influenced by combining 19th Century concepts of a botanical conservatory, a gazebo, a beer garden and a pedestrian shopping arcade, all of which were common features of early Phoenix architecture. The Pavilion hosts many national and cultural festivals throughout the year. The Rosson House is the cornerstone of a city block dating from the late 19th century. The house has been restored to its Victorian roots and offers tours. The Duplex, built in 1923, is the youngest of the homes on the block. Its sleeping porches constructed with canvas and wood panels, let in the cool evening desert air. The Carriage House is located in the center of the Square. It was built as a mule barn for the Teeter House in 1899. The Silva House, a bungalow with neoclassical revival influences, was built in 1900. The Rose and Crown, an English Pub, now occupies this historical home. The Bouvier-Teeter House was built in 1899. It is now a Victorian Tea Room. The Baird Machine Shop was a commercial structure when it was built in 1929. It is now home to Pizzeria Bianco, which has been named by various sources as the best Pizza in America. The Thomas House was moved to block 15, of Historic Heritage Square in the 1980s to save the home from demolition. This 1909 neoclassical styled building houses Bar Bianco, an adjunct to Pizzeria Bianco. The Stevens-Haustgen House was built in 1901 as a rental property. The building is significant for its representation of the historic California bungalow style built around the turn of the 20th century.

== Phoenix's Historic Heritage Square gallery ==
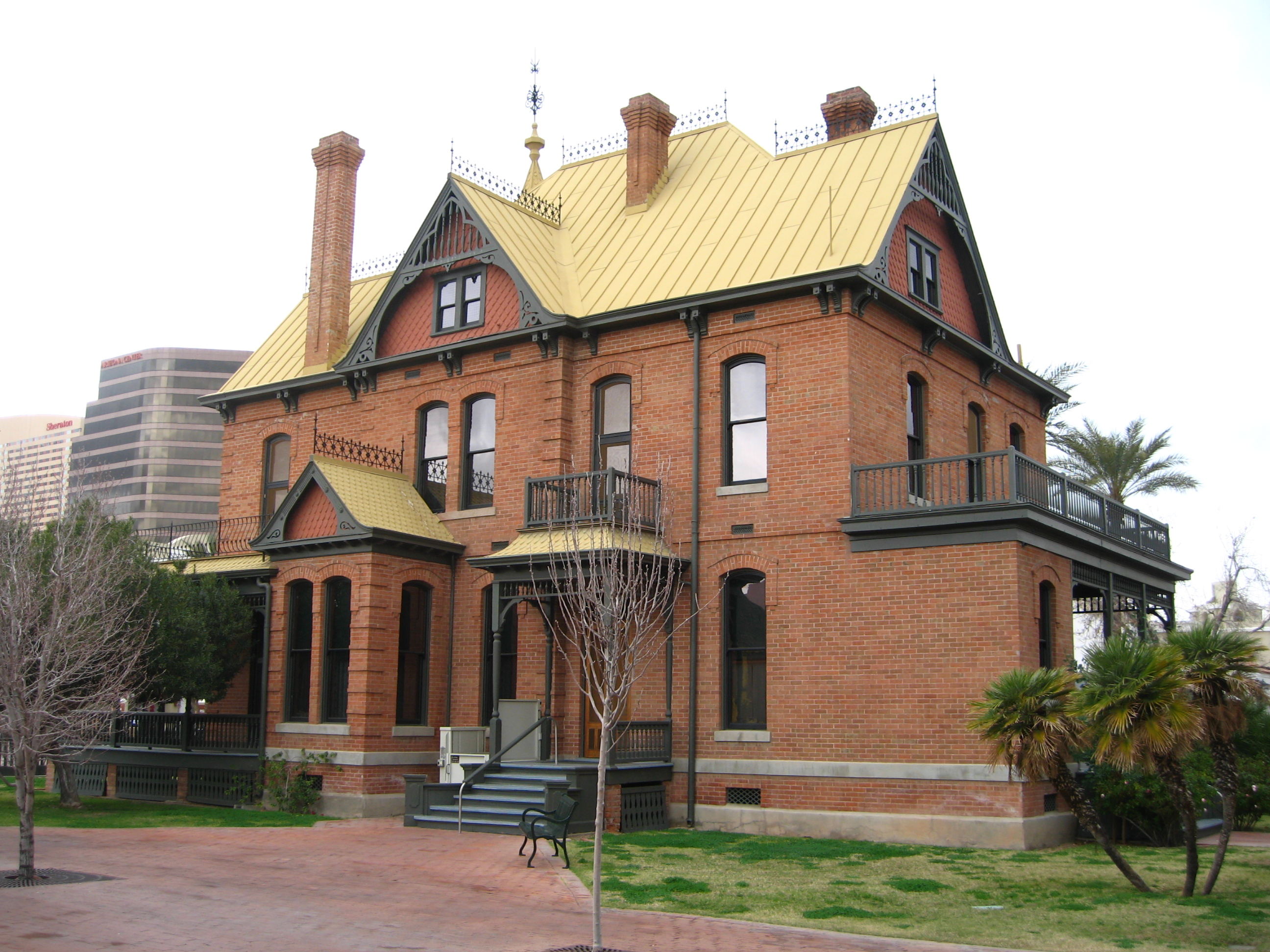
The Dr. Roland Lee Rosson House was built in 1895.

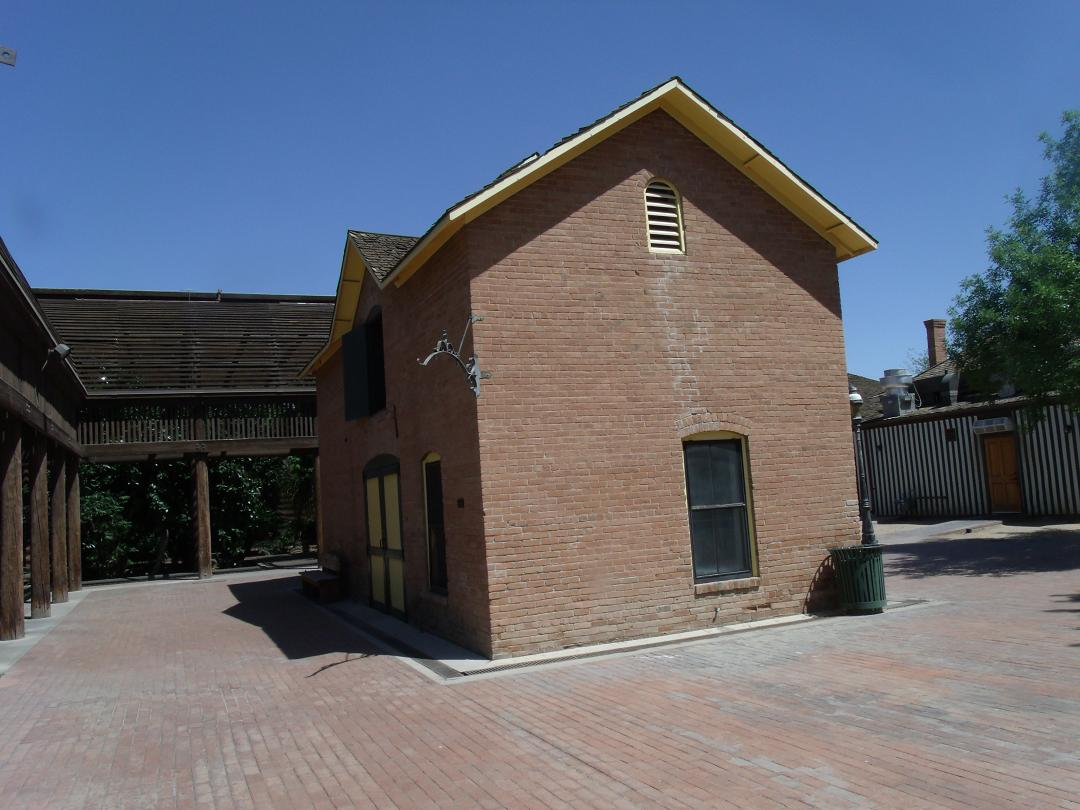
The Rosson Carriage House, built in 1899

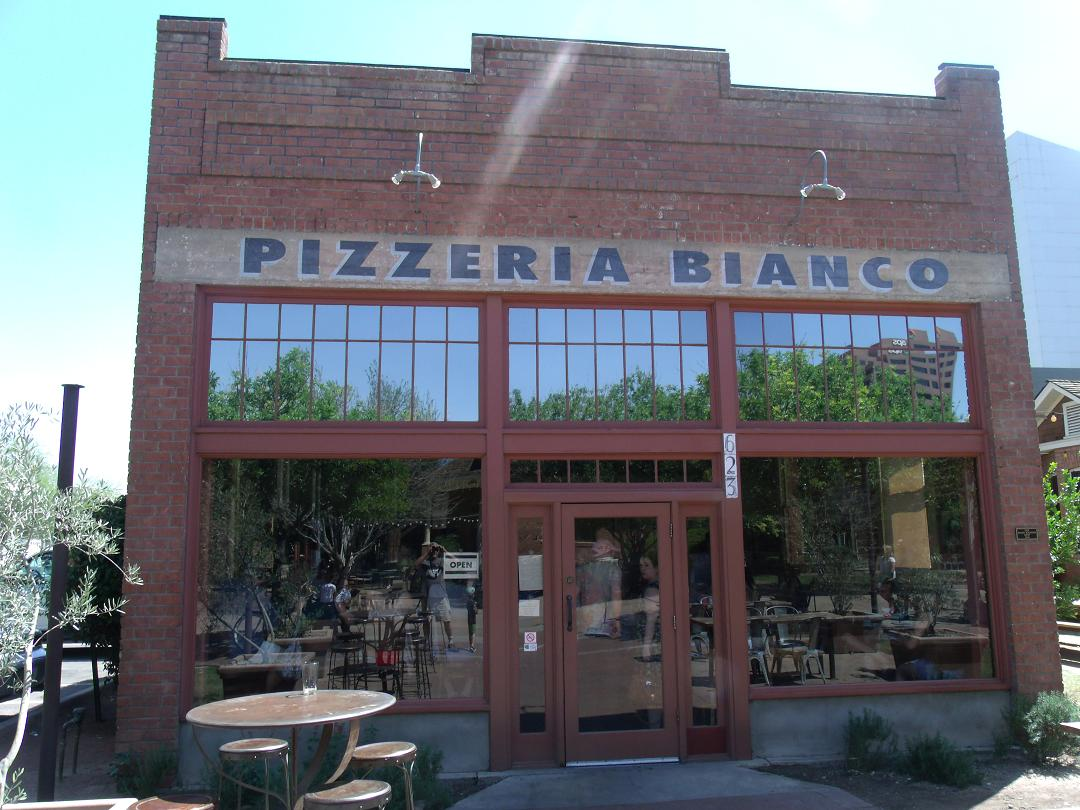
The Baird Machine Shop, built in 1920

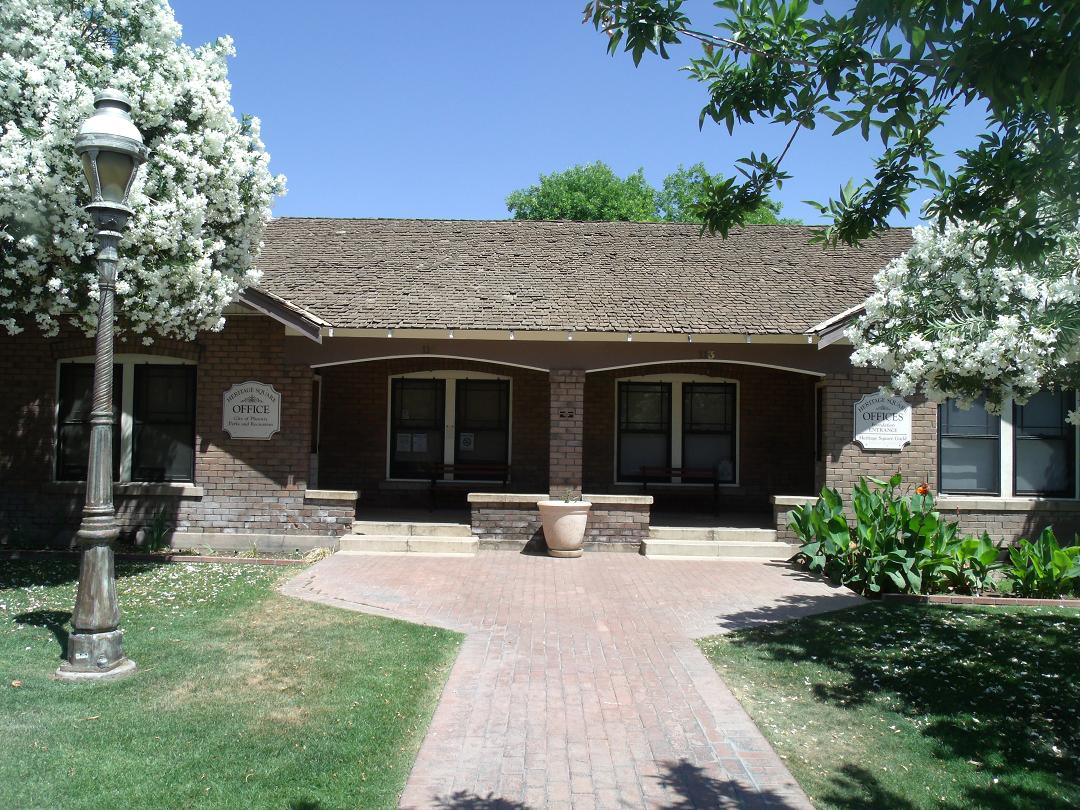
The Hughe's-Stevens Duplex, built in 1923

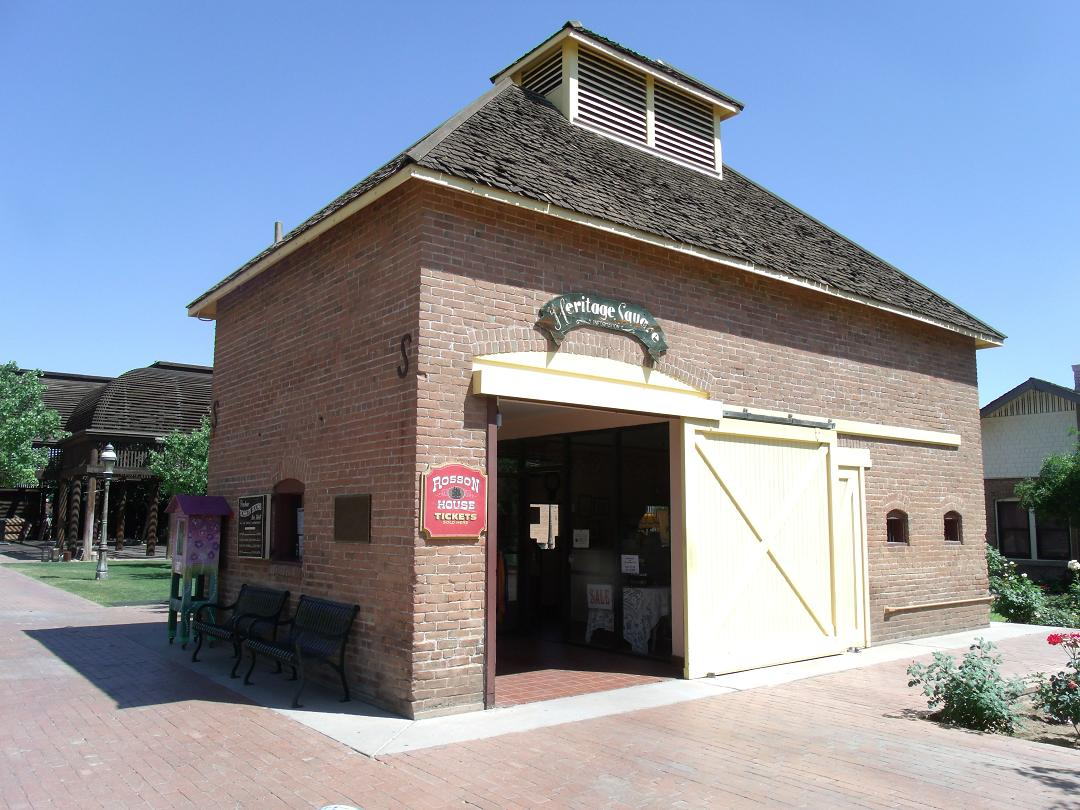
The Forest Burgess Carriage House, was built in 1881.

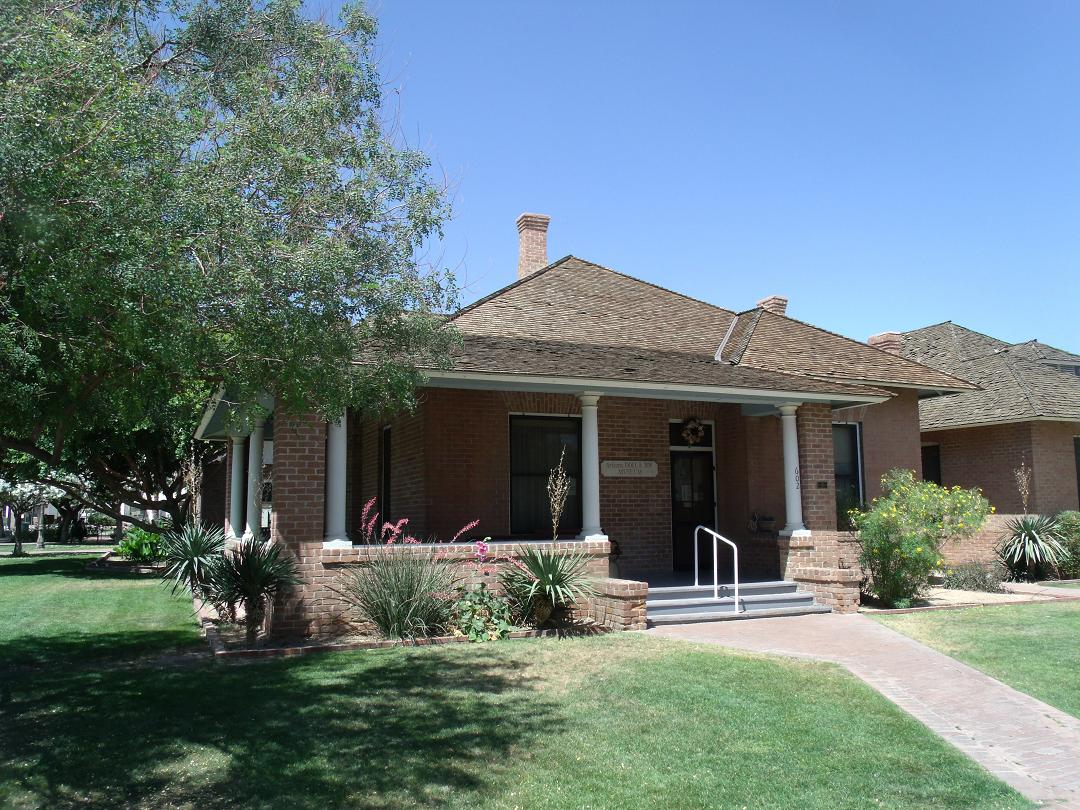
The Stevens House, built in 1901

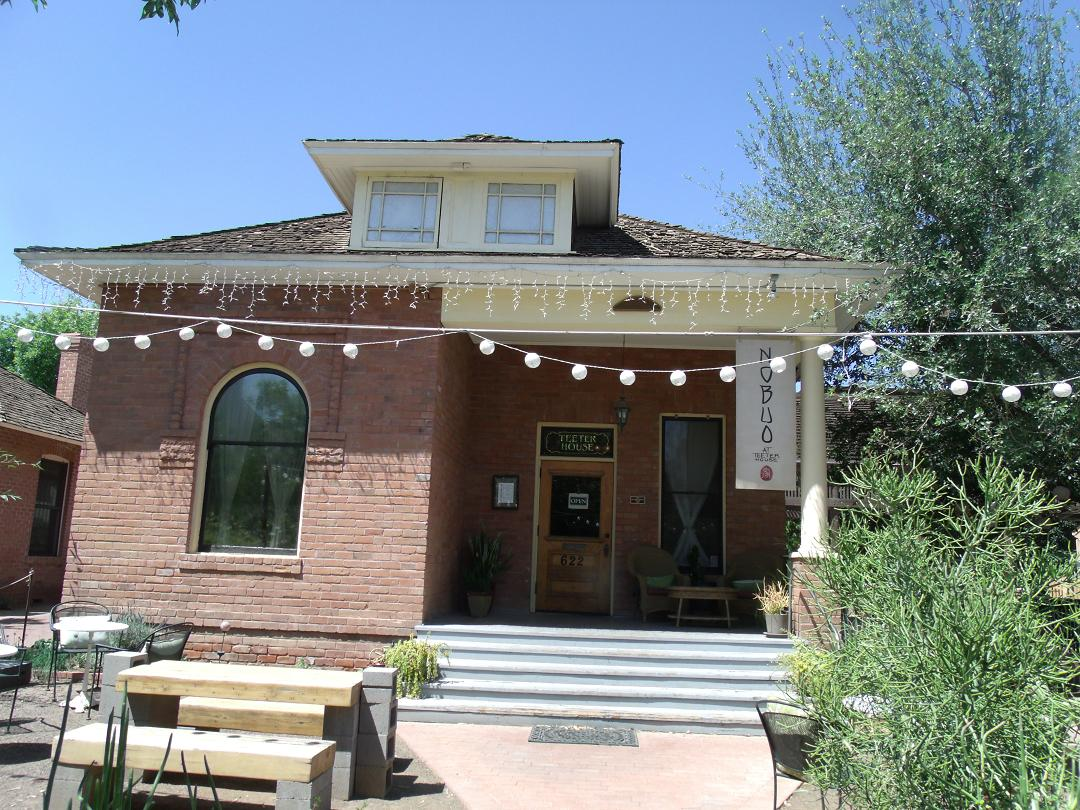
The Bouvier Teeter House, built in 1899

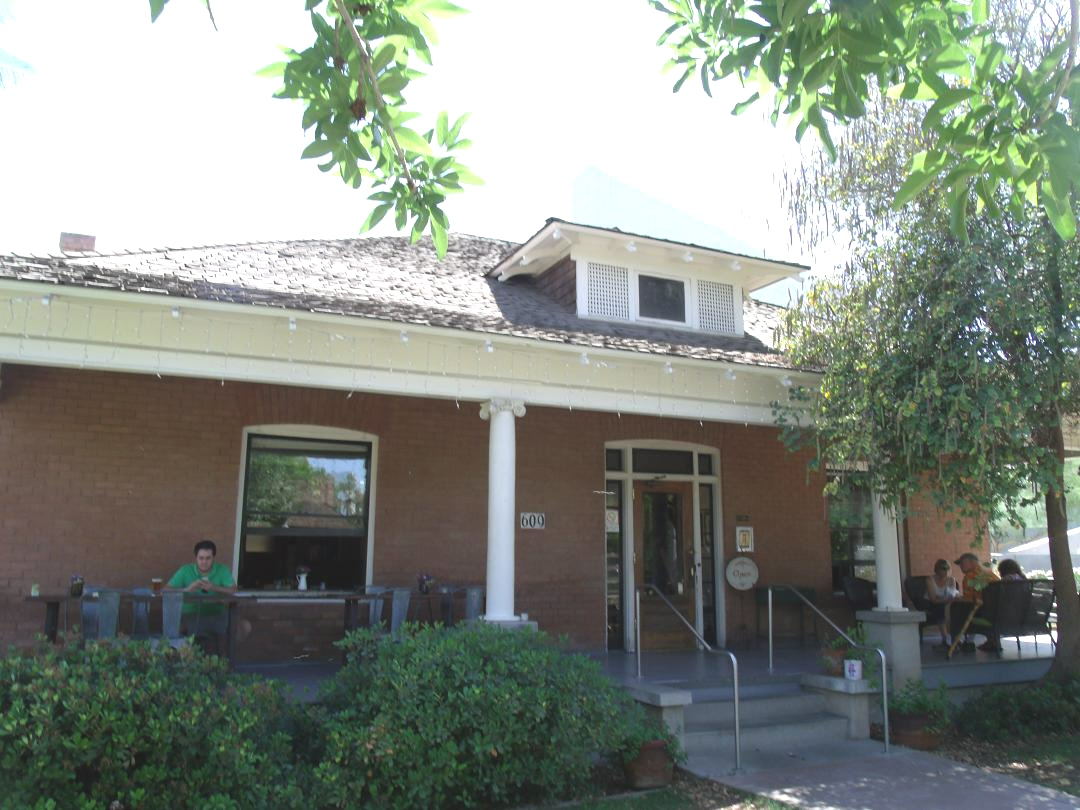
The Thomas House, built in 1909

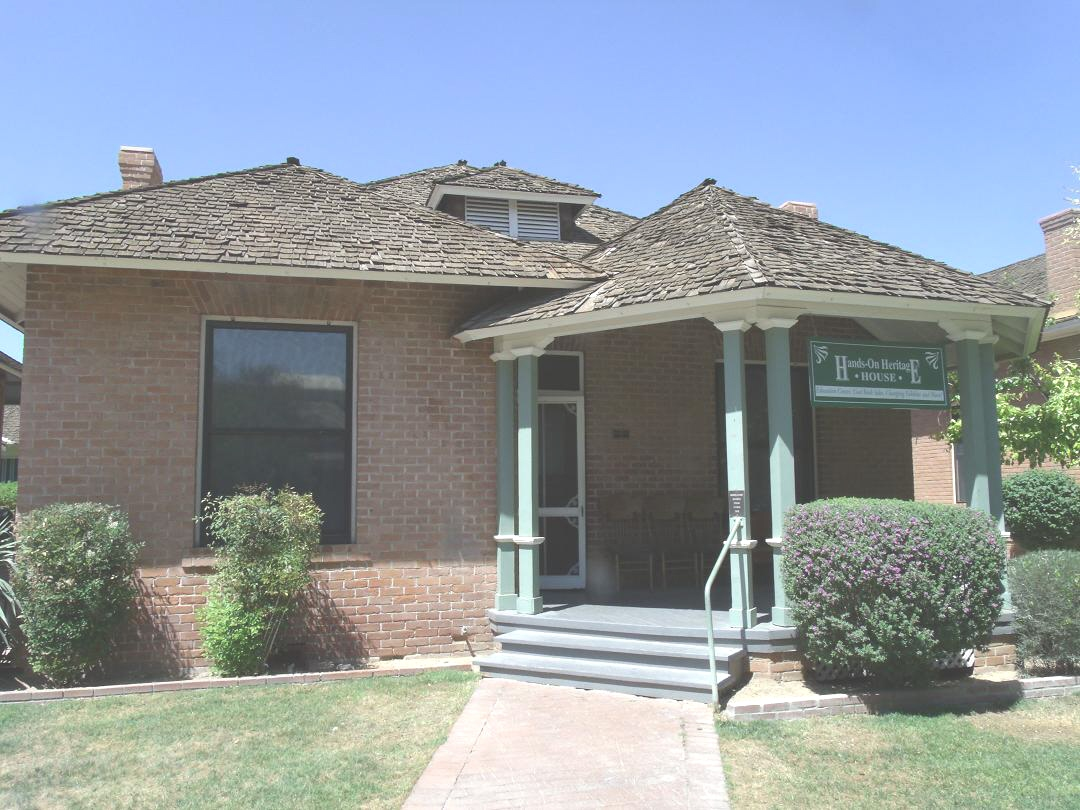
The Stevens-Haugsten House, built in 1901

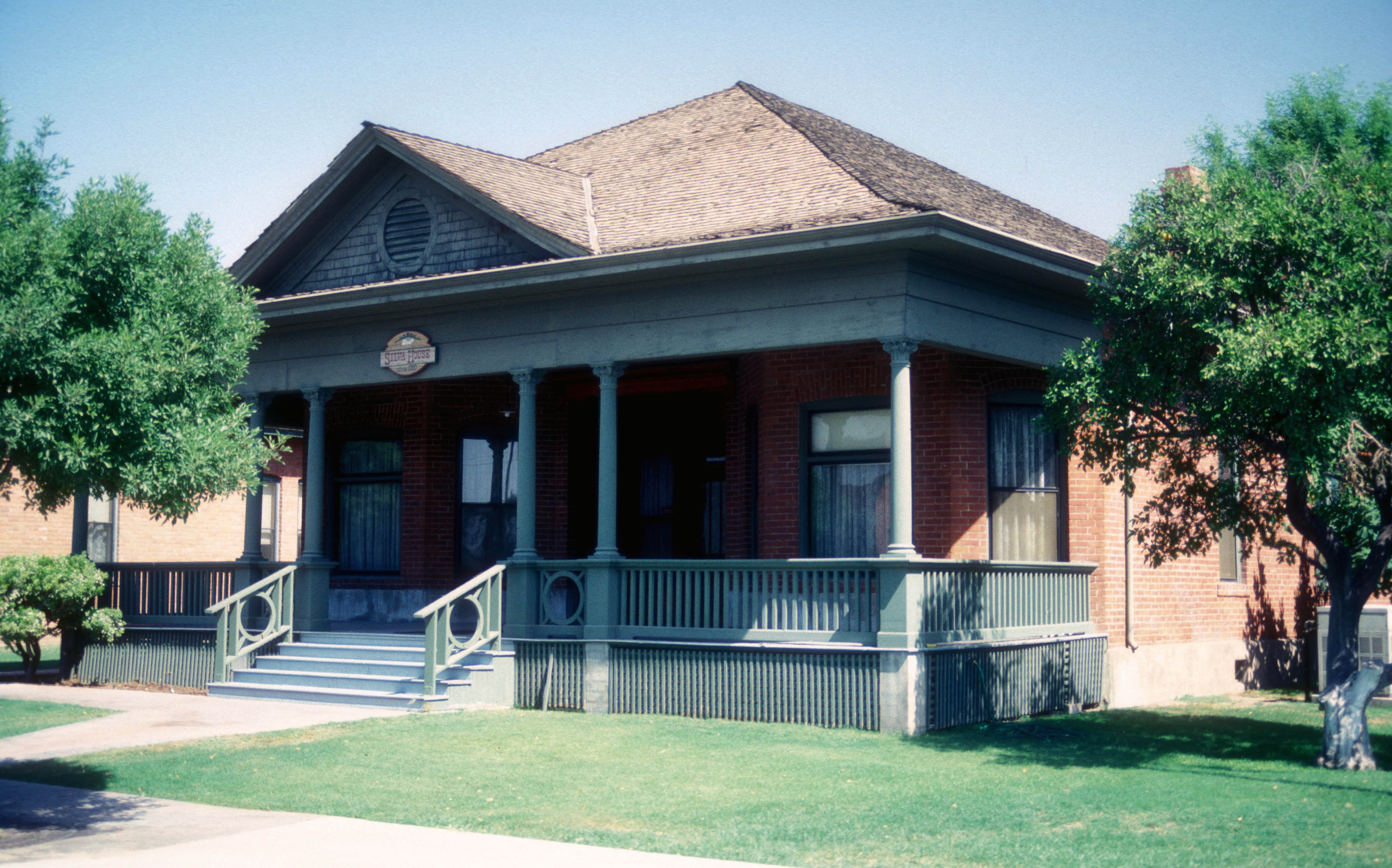
The Silva House, built in 1900

== Historic neighborhoods ==
Downtown and Central Phoenix are home to several historic neighborhoods ranging from turn-of-the-20th-century Victorian to mid-20th-century modern architecture. Some of them, like the Willo and Encanto-Palmcroft districts, are more established and in demand, while others are still redeveloping. The better-known districts include Coronado, Roosevelt, Encanto-Palmcroft, FQ Story and Willo.

=== Encanto-Palmcroft Historic District ===
Rooted firmly in the City Beautiful movement of planning, the Palmcroft and Encanto Districts were developed starting in the late 1920s. With winding lanes, tree-lined streets, lush landscaping and nearby Encanto Park, this neighborhood resembles more of an English suburb than a Phoenician neighborhood. The district contains many larger, period revival manors, marking a time when it was a getaway from the hustle and bustle of early city life. The Encanto-Palmcroft historic neighborhood is diminutive in size with approximately 330 households. Architecture in Encanto-Palmcroft includes Spanish Colonial, Tudor Revival, Cape Cod and Monterey Revival. The proximity of this quaint Downtown Phoenix neighborhood to Encanto Park represents an approach to suburban planning referred to as "City Beautiful" that evolved in Phoenix as a highly successful achievement. It symbolized a romanticized approach to architecture and the houses tend to "look towards each other," reinforcing a sense of community. Boundaries: Encanto Boulevard south to McDowell Road; Seventh Avenue west to 15th Avenue

=== Roosevelt Historic Neighborhood ===
Honored with the first distinction of historical designation in the City of Phoenix, the Roosevelt Neighborhood has a history that is rich and deep. From its architectural milestones still visible today, its importance in Phoenix's original booming tourist trade, and its role as one of the first "streetcar suburbs," Roosevelt has remained a vital community to the city's past, present, and future. It lies bounded by Central Avenue and 7th Avenue from McDowell to Fillmore and is peppered with buildings and homes of architectural significance. It is a true urban neighborhood, with a walkable scale, close proximity to public transportation, and friendly neighborhood cafes and local businesses.

=== Coronado District ===
Greater Coronado consists of three neighborhoods — Historic Coronado, Country Club Park and Brentwood — and includes over 5,000 households and hundreds of businesses. Centrally located near both State Road 51 and Interstate 10, single-family homes feature architectural styles ranging from California Bungalow and Spanish Colonial Revival to ranches and the occasional modern re-do. Boundaries: Thomas Road south to Interstate 10; State Road 51 west to Seventh Street

=== Garfield Historic District ===
Developed from 1883 to 1955, Garfield Historic District contains nearly 800 households and contains primarily modest bungalows, Period Revival homes and the city's largest concentration of pyramidal cottages. Before becoming a residential community Garfield was part of an extensive agricultural tract. Boundaries: Roosevelt Street south to Van Buren Street; 16th Street west to Seventh Street

=== Willo Historic District ===
Willo Historic District has been voted one of the top 10 cottage communities in the United States. Bike-friendly and walk-able to light rail, businesses and cultural attractions, Willo was once considered suburban, and predominantly home to those interested in agricultural pursuits. It's still known for its lush greenery. Boundaries: Thomas Road south to McDowell Road; First Avenue west to Seventh Avenue

=== Downtown Core ===
Light rail, growing academic campuses and renewed demand for urban living has supercharged development in the Downtown Core. The core offers easy access to restaurants, retail and cultural attractions as the true urban center in the Valley. Boundaries: Fillmore Street south to Pacific Railroad; Seventh Street west to Third Avenue

=== Grand Avenue ===
Grand Avenue's diagonal course breaks up Phoenix's grid and is dominated by local businesses, art studios, converted warehouses, bars, restaurants and restored storefronts. Boundaries: McDowell Road south to Van Buren Street; Seventh Avenue west to 19th Avenue

=== Eastlake Park ===
The Eastlake Park neighborhood is a traditional African-American enclave in the Downtown area. The main focal point is the park itself, which is the oldest in the city and originally boasted a centrally located lake and pathway. Boundaries: North of Washington Street south to Jefferson Street; 16th Street west to 12th Street

=== Grant Park ===
Grant Park is one of 13 neighborhoods in the community of Central City South. Latino heritage and culture is strong in Grant Park, and is home to Friendly House Inc., which has served new immigrants since 1915; American Legion Post 41, the first Legion to allow Hispanics as members after World War II; El Portal Restaurant; St. Mary's Catholic Church, which is on the Hispanic historical registry; Grant Park Community Garden; La Canasta Mexican Restaurant and the Grant Park Community Center, famous for its "Midnight Basketball Classic" and other youth programs. Boundaries: Grant Street south to Buckeye Road; Central Avenue west to Seventh Avenue

=== Evans-Churchill Neighborhood and Roosevelt Row ===
The Evans-Churchill neighborhood sits directly adjacent to the Downtown Core and is home to Roosevelt Row — the nationally recognized arts district that hosts First Fridays. Since 1994 this monthly event has grown to become the largest monthly artwalk in the United States. Increasing interest in this area has prompted Roosevelt Row to becoming more pedestrian-friendly and it is supportive of small local independent businesses that give downtown Phoenix character. The area's development is overseen by the non-profit Roosevelt Row Community Development Corporation. With a mix of single-family homes and infill mid-rise developments, this neighborhood serves as a vibrant and arts-focused transitional area between the dense core and surrounding historic districts. Boundaries: McDowell Road south to Fillmore Street; Seventh Street west to Central Avenue

=== Central Park ===
Emerging businesses, community gardens and thriving programs for adults and youths are the hallmarks of this close-knit neighborhood located south of Chase Field. Attractions include Bentley Projects, the George Washington Carver Museum and Cultural Center, Central Park Neighborhood Community Center, The Levine Machine and Phoenix Day Child & Family Center, which has served the community since 1915. Central Park Phoenix is one of 13 neighborhoods in the Central City South Community. Boundaries: Lincoln Street south to Buckeye Road; 7th Street west to Central Avenue

=== FQ Story ===
The quaint F.Q. Story neighborhood consists of over 600 households, most built between 1920 through the 1940s, with architectural styles ranging from Spanish Colonial Revival and Tudor to craftsman bungalows and ranch-style homes. This historic Downtown Phoenix neighborhood is named for Francis Quarles Story, who sold wool in Boston and citrus in Los Angeles before expanding to the Salt River Valley of Arizona. Though never a resident of Phoenix, Story is credited for building the Grand Avenue thoroughfare and the subsequent streetcar line. Boundaries: McDowell Road south to Roosevelt Street; Seventh Avenue west to 17th Avenue

=== Warehouse District ===
Located just south of the Downtown Core and north of Central City South, the Phoenix Warehouse District was the location of early Phoenix's agricultural shipping, historic Chinatown, rail yard and produce distribution centers. The area's remaining period buildings have been top targets for adaptive reuse and are home to several technological and creative-type businesses. Boundaries: Jackson Street south to Grant Street; 7th Street west to 7th Avenue

== Government and infrastructure ==
Downtown Phoenix is the home of City Hall, Justice Courts, Phoenix Municipal Court, Superior Court of Arizona and Bankruptcy Court. United States Postal Service operates the Downtown Phoenix Post Office at 522 North Central Avenue.

Downtown Phoenix has the Valley Metro Rail which consists of 41 stations throughout 3 different cities in the Phoenix Metropolitan Area. Some of the major stations, like Van Buren/1st Avenue and Van Buren/Central Avenue stations, are located in Downtown Phoenix.

== Downtown Phoenix in film and television ==
Mel's Diner, on the outskirts of downtown has been an old Phoenix landmark for decades. It is famous for being the setting for the TV sitcom Alice.

Many movies have been filmed in Phoenix using downtown locations.

- The 1960 film, Psycho features the Downtown Phoenix skyline in the opening shot. Originally Alfred Hitchcock wanted a helicopter shot to fly through downtown into the window of a hotel, but the shot was changed to a series of pan and fade shots.
- In the 1998 remake of Psycho Gus Van Sant filmed the opening shot using a helicopter and zooming into the eighth floor of the Westward Ho.
- Parade scenes for the 1956 Marilyn Monroe film, Bus Stop, were filmed in front of the Westward Ho.
- In the film Waiting to Exhale, Lela Rochon is shown in front of the Phoenix City Hall building in her character's introduction scene.
- In the film The Gauntlet, the open shots feature the Phoenix skyline. Downtown is also used in the final climatic shoot-out between Clint Eastwood's character and the Phoenix Police, ending in front of the Phoenix Symphony Hall.
- In the film Ninja III: The Domination, a car chase uses the streets of downtown.
- Blue Collar Comedy Tour: The Movie was filmed at The Dodge Theater in 2003.
- In the 1978 made-for-TV movie A Fire in the Sky, a comet crashes into Earth west of the city which destroys downtown Phoenix. Many landmarks are shown during the destruction. Wells Fargo Plaza and the Hyatt Regency Phoenix are shown collapsing while the glass skin of the Chase Tower, is blown from its steel skeleton. The antenna of the Westward Ho falls to the ground as a result of the impact blast. This film should not be confused for the 1993 alien abduction movie of the same name.
- In The Banger Sisters, the skyline is featured.
- In the film The Getaway, Phoenix stands in for Albuquerque with Kim Basinger navigating through downtown's streets and alleys.
- The Arizona Center is used in the opening scenes of the 1998 film, Phoenix.
- The Paul Newman film, Pocket Money, used the Westward Ho courtyard for scenes in 1972.
- Olympic gold medalist Mitch Gaylord was filmed in the final competition scenes for 1986's American Anthem at the now-razed Phoenix Union High School gym.
- The Kingdom filmed sections in Downtown's historical buildings.
- In October 2008, Luke Wilson shot scenes throughout downtown for Middlemen.

== Gallery ==
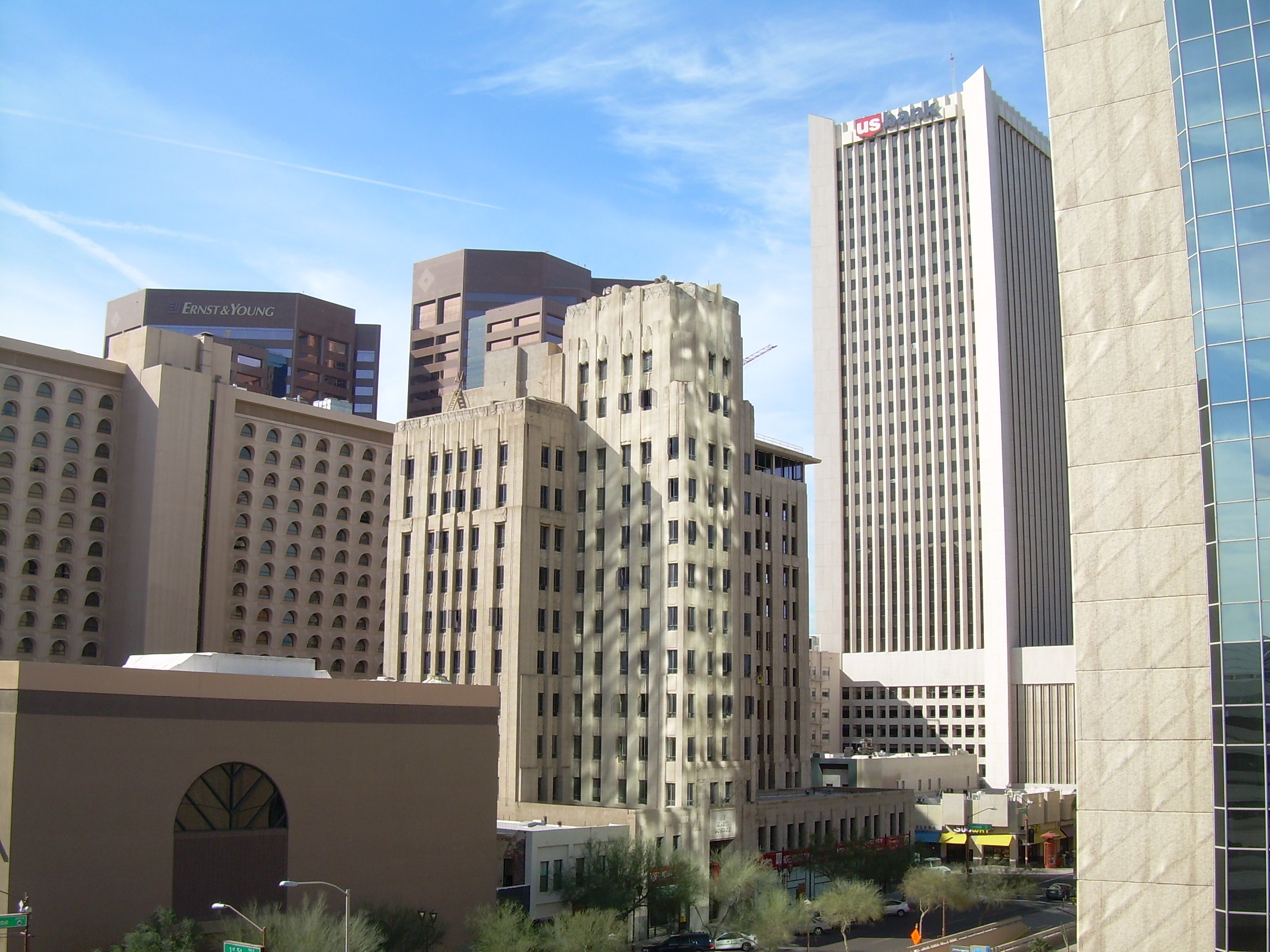
Downtown skyline

Hyatt Regency Phoenix, 2008

2008

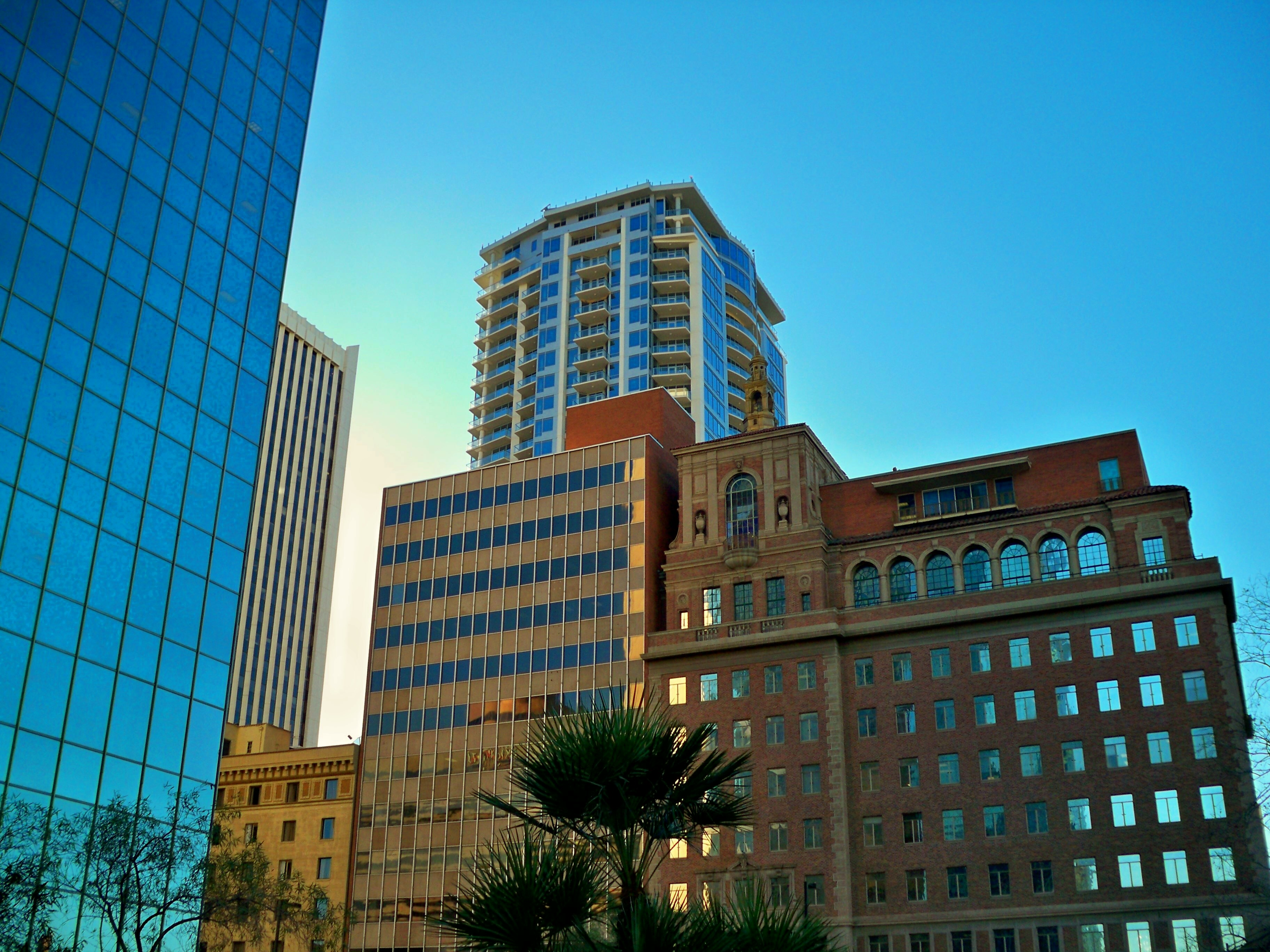
44 Monroe, 2009

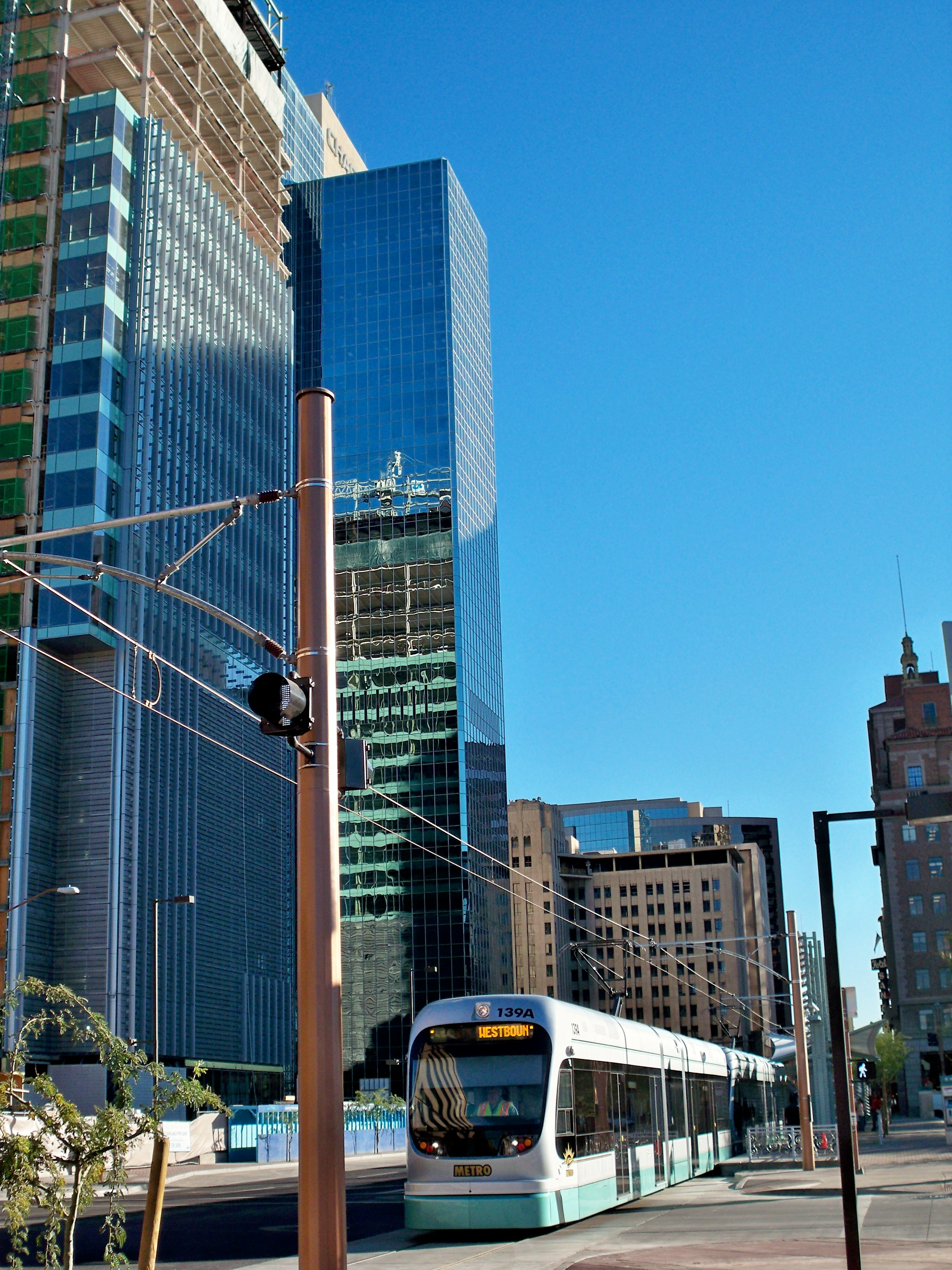
Valley Metro Rail

== See also ==
- List of historic properties in Phoenix, Arizona
- List of tallest buildings in Phoenix
