= Bank of America Tower =

Bank of America Tower may refer to:

- Bank of America Corporate Center, the bank's headquarters in Charlotte, North Carolina, United States
- 110 North Wacker, Chicago, Illinois, United States
- Bank of America Tower (Fort Worth), Texas, United States
- Bank of America Tower (Hong Kong), Victoria City, Hong Kong
- Bank of America Tower (Jacksonville), Florida, United States
- Bank of America Tower (Manhattan), New York, United States
- Bank of America Tower (Phoenix), Arizona, United States

Buildings formerly known as the Bank of America Tower:

- 555 California Street, San Francisco, California, United States
- Albuquerque Plaza, New Mexico, United States
- Columbia Center, Seattle, Washington, United States
- Miami Tower, Florida, United States
- One Progress Plaza, St. Petersburg, Florida, United States

== See also ==
- Bank of America Building (disambiguation)
- Bank of America Center (disambiguation)
- Bank of America Plaza (disambiguation)
