= Willo, Arizona =

Community neighborhood in Phoenix, Arizona

Willo, Arizona, commonly known as the Willo Historic District, is a community neighborhood within Phoenix, Arizona. The Willo Historic District was originally one of downtown Phoenix’s first historic suburbs planned in the 1920s. It has small shops, houses, and apartments. According to the 2013 census, it has a population of 2,198 people.
