= DRW Trading Group =

Proprietary electronic trading firm

DRW Holdings, LLC
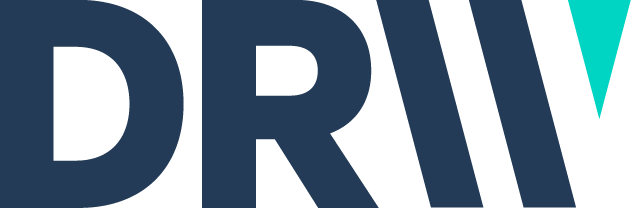

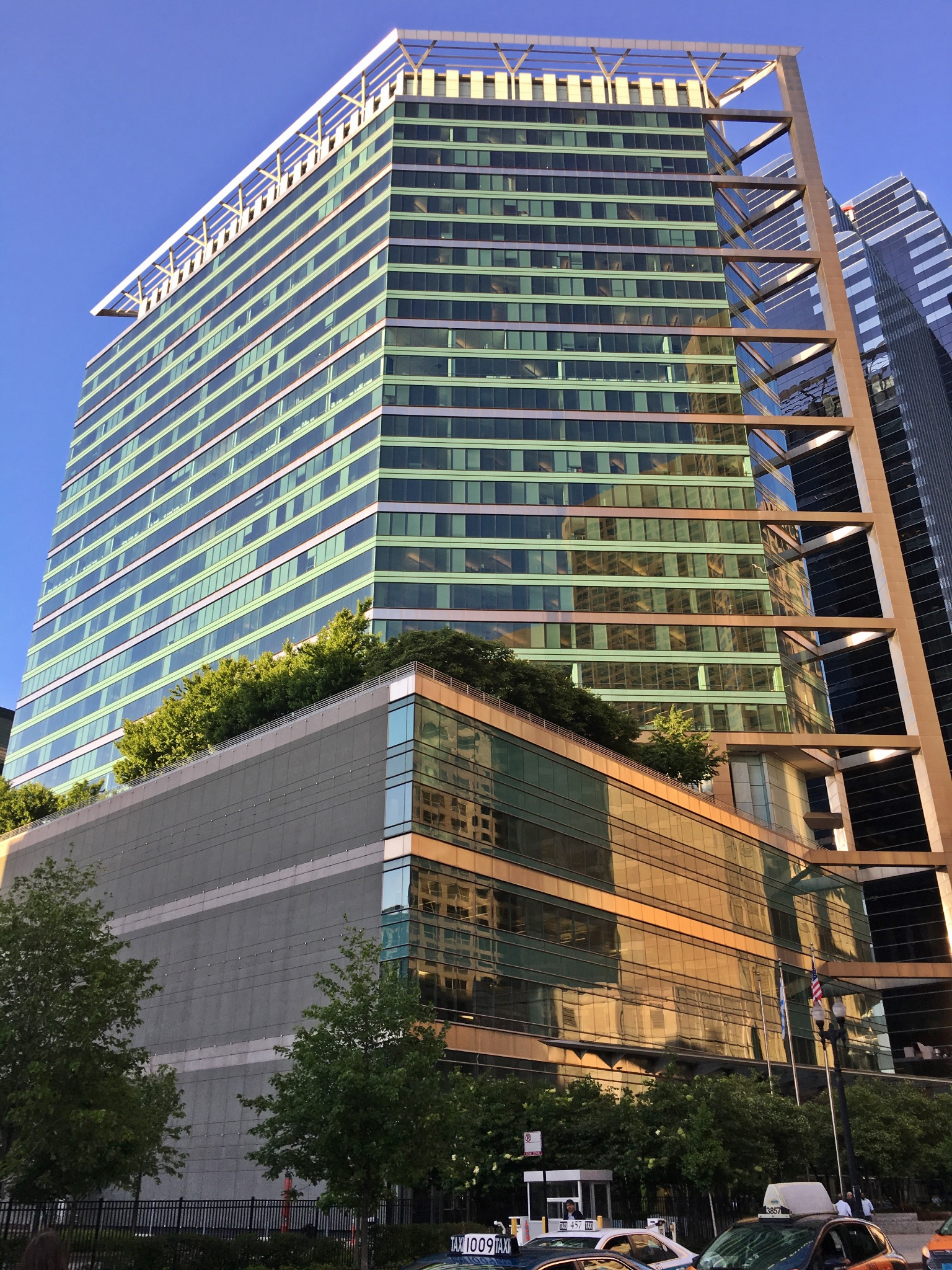
- Headquarters at 540 West Madison
- Type: Private
- Industry: Financial services
- Founded: 1992; 34 years ago
- Founder: Don Wilson
- Headquarters: Chicago, Illinois, U.S.
- Products: Proprietary trading Algorithmic trading High-frequency trading
- Number of employees: 2,000 (2025)
- Website: drw.com

DRW Holdings, LLC, commonly known as DRW, is an American proprietary trading firm based in Chicago, Illinois. Founded in 1992 by Don Wilson, a former options trader at the Chicago Mercantile Exchange, the firm trades across asset classes including fixed income, derivatives, energy, agriculture, and digital assets.

DRW operates globally through North America, Europe, Asia, and the Middle East, and has expanded through acquisitions including Chopper Trading and RGM Advisors.

== History ==
DRW was founded in 1992 by Don Wilson, an options trader at the Chicago Mercantile Exchange, and was named after his initials. The firm utilizes a variety of different strategies, including high-frequency trading, and was a notable subject in Michael Lewis's 2014 book Flash Boys, which describes how several trading firms compete to build infrastructure designed to reduce latency in electronic trading (latency arbitrage).

DRW has expanded through acquisitions and portfolio transactions. In 2008, during the collapse of investment bank Lehman Brothers, DRW purchased Lehman's foreign exchange, interest-rate derivatives, and agricultural derivatives portfolios in a fire sale auction. In 2015, DRW acquired proprietary trading firm Chopper Trading. In August 2017, Reuters reported that DRW had acquired high-frequency trading firm RGM Advisors. Later, in November 2017, DRW established an energy trading group in Houston from Martin Energy Trading.

DRW has also been active in the cryptocurrency and blockchain space. In 2014, DRW launched Cumberland, a cryptocurrency trading subsidiary focused on institutional digital asset markets. Cumberland has been described as a liquidity provider in cryptocurrency markets and a participant in institutional digital asset trading.

In 2018, DRW backed Eris Exchange, a cryptocurrency market that allows trading various cryptocurrencies such as Bitcoin, Ethereum, and Bitcoin Cash. Digital Asset Holdings, which is creating a "blockchain database," was spun out of a Bitcoin trading operation at DRW.

In 2020, founder Don Wilson co-founded a nonprofit organization that seeks to reduce greenhouse gas emissions by purchasing and retiring emissions allowances in regulated carbon cap and trade markets.

In 2025, DRW expanded its London operations, hiring at least 23 traders and other professionals from investment banks and hedge funds, including UBS, Millennium Management, and BNP Paribas.

== Regulatory and legal matters ==
DRW has been the subject of regulatory litigation.

In 2013, the Commodity Futures Trading Commission (CFTC) filed a civil enforcement action against DRW and founder Don Wilson, alleging manipulation of interest-rate swap futures during 2010 and 2011. In 2018, the case was dismissed after a federal judge ruled that the CFTC had failed to prove its allegations.

In October 2024, the U.S. Securities and Exchange Commission (SEC) filed a civil enforcement action against Cumberland DRW, alleging that it had operated as an unregistered securities dealer in digital asset markets since at least 2018 and had executed more than $2 billion in crypto asset transactions that the regulator characterized as securities.

In March 2025. the SEC dismissed the action pursuant to a join stipulation with Cumberland DRW, and the case was terminated with prejudice by court.
