= Bank of America Center =

Bank of America Center may refer to:

- Bank of America Center (Austin, Texas)
- Bank of America Center (Baltimore), Maryland
- Bank of America Center (Houston), Texas
- Bank of America Center (Los Angeles), California
- Bank of America Center (Norfolk, Virginia)
- Bank of America Center (Orlando, Florida)
- Bank of America Center (Portland, Oregon)
- Bank of America Corporate Center, Charlotte, North Carolina
- Arvest Tower, Tulsa, Oklahoma, formerly known as the Bank of America Center
- 555 California Street, San Francisco, California, formerly known as the Bank of America Center
- CenturyLink Arena Boise, Boise, Idaho, formerly known as Qwest Arena and Bank of America Centre

== See also ==
- Bank of America Building (disambiguation)
- Bank of America Plaza (disambiguation)
- Bank of America Tower (disambiguation)
