= Bank of America Building =

Bank of America Building may refer to:

- Bank of America Building (Athens, Georgia)
- 9454 Wilshire Boulevard, also known as the Bank of America Building in Beverly Hills, California
- Bank of America Building (Baltimore), Maryland
- Bank of America Building (Chicago), Illinois
- Bank of America Building (Los Angeles)
- Bank of America Building (Midland), Texas
- Bank of America Building (Oakland), California
- 111 Westminster Street, Providence, Rhode Island, formerly known as the Bank of America Building
- Bank of America Building (San Jose, California)

== See also ==
- Bank of America Center (disambiguation)
- Bank of America Plaza (disambiguation)
- Bank of America Tower (disambiguation)
