= Bank of America Tower (Phoenix) =

Highrise multi-use building

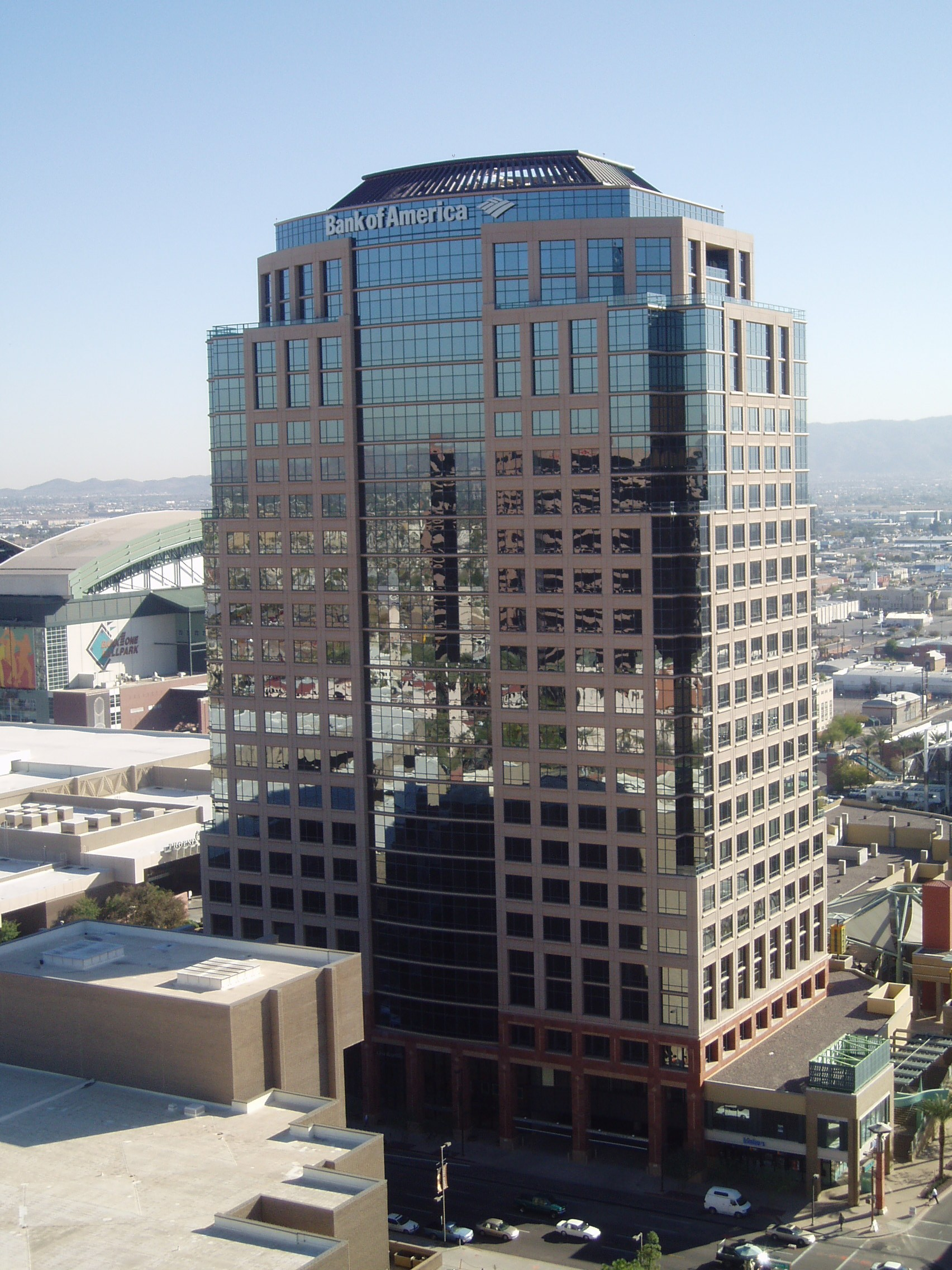
- Interactive map of the Bank of America Tower area
- Alternative names: Collier Center I

General information
- Type: Commercial offices
- Location: 201 E. Washington St. Phoenix, Arizona
- Coordinates: 33.4479°N 112.0704°W
- Completed: 2000
- Owner: Collier Center PT, LLC
- Operator: RED Property Management

Height
- Roof: 109.73 m (360.0 ft)

Technical details
- Floor count: 24
- Floor area: 597,257 sq ft (55,487.0 m^{2})
- Lifts/elevators: 16

Design and construction
- Architect: Opus Architects & Engineers

The Bank of America Tower is a highrise in downtown Phoenix, Arizona. The tower is the centerpiece of the Collier Center, a multi-use office and entertainment complex. The tower was completed in 2000 and serves as the state headquarters for Bank of America, which moved from 101 North 1st Avenue. It rises 360 feet (110 m), topping out at 23 floors. It was designed in the postmodern style by Opus Architects and Engineers.

A Bank of America branch, main lobby, and elevators to the upper floors are located on the second floor. Bank of America also occupies floors 19–24. There is no floor designated as 13.

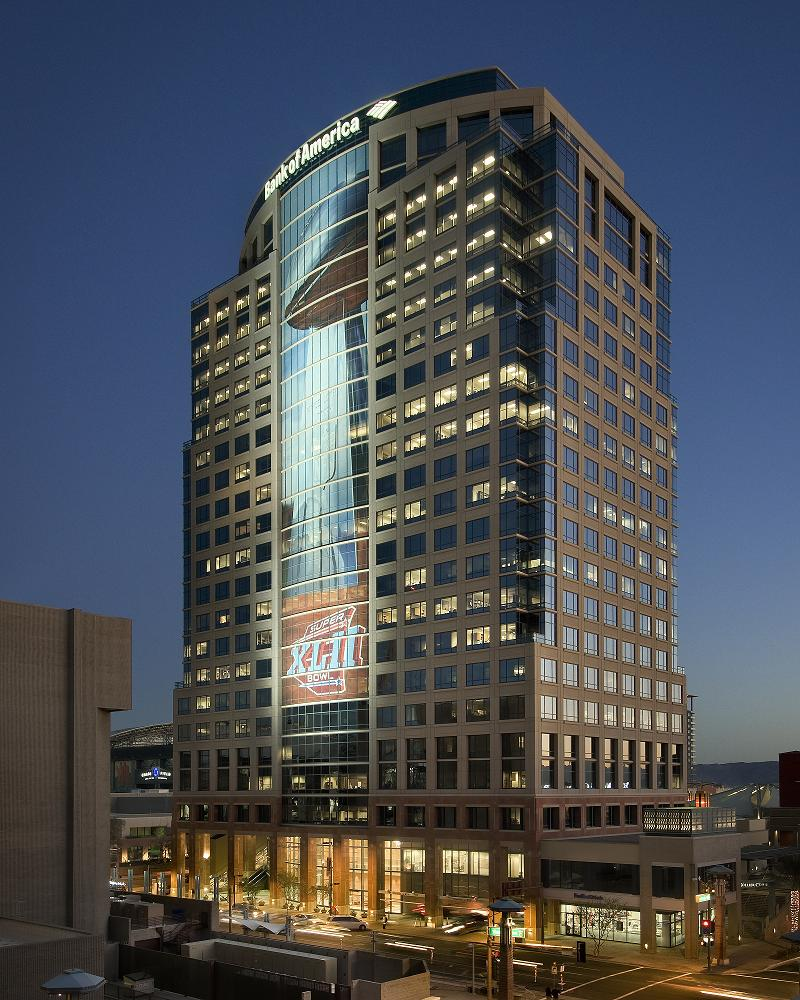
Bank of America celebrates Super Bowl XLII

In January, 2008, the tower was covered with a graphic of the Vince Lombardi Trophy in anticipation of Super Bowl XLII. The image was on the north face of the building overlooking Copper Square and spanned 18 floors. Bank of America Tower joined Hyatt Regency Phoenix in Downtown Phoenix with their temporary football themed decor.

In February, 2009, the east and south faces of the tower were covered with T-Mobile branded messages in anticipation of the 2009 NBA All Star Game. Elite Media, Inc. of Las Vegas completed installation of Phoenix's Largest Ad on the exterior of the Bank of America Tower in Downtown Phoenix. The south façade ad stood at 190' tall by 188' wide, and the east façade ad at 190' tall by 94'6" wide. The 53,694 total square feet of ad space was formed out of over 1,400 individual panels to create the large mural images. The Elite Media Wall System panels measured at 4' × 20' and each was constructed out of a unique, weather-resistant, "see-through," perforated, adhesive material. Job installation took two weeks and required 5 installers hanging from scaffolding off the 380-foot (120 m) façade.
