= 44 Monroe =

High-rise building in Phoenix, Arizona

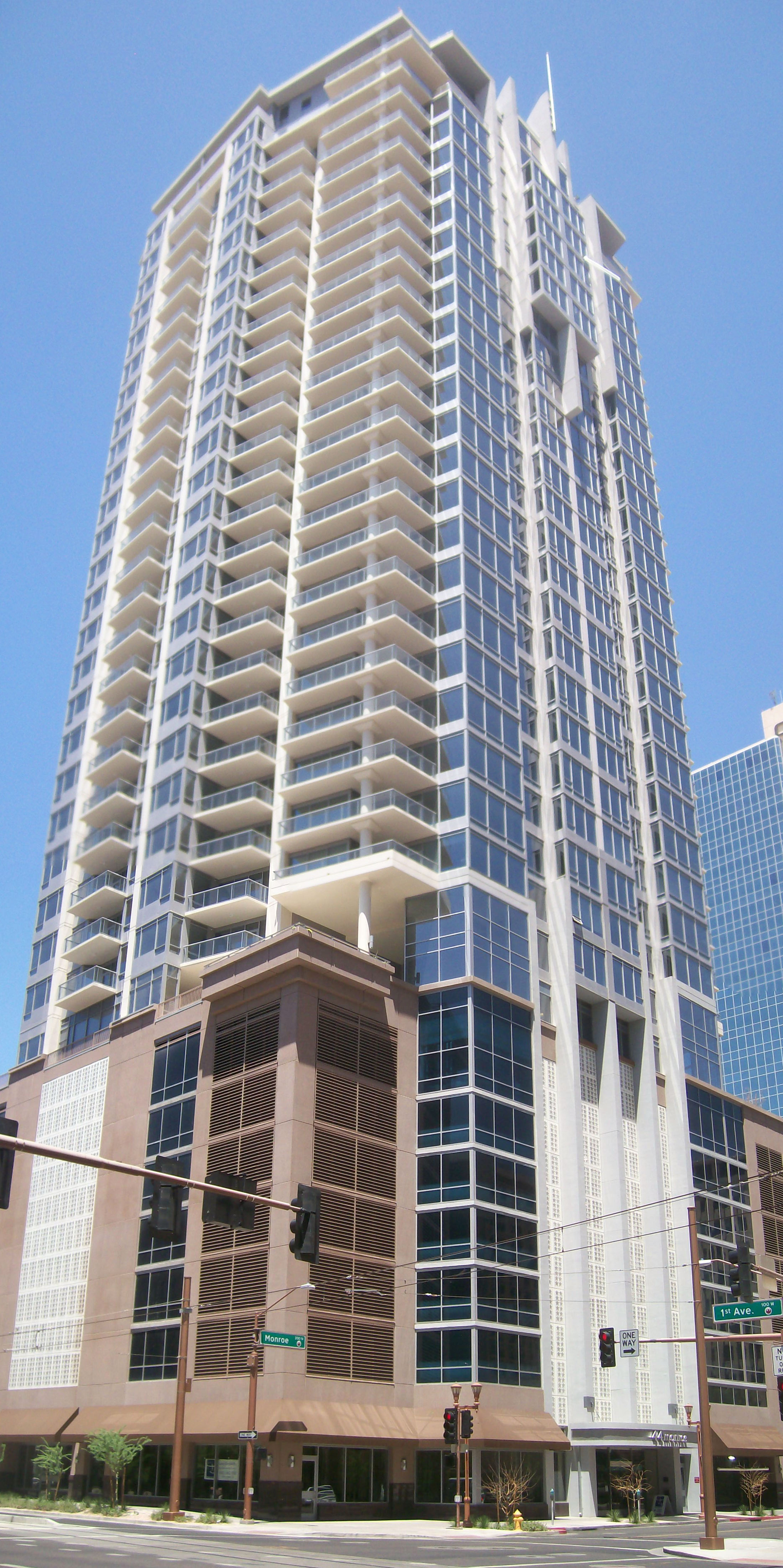
- 44 Monroe is Phoenix's fifth-tallest building.
- Interactive map of the 44 Monroe area

General information
- Status: Completed
- Type: Residential
- Location: 44 West Monroe; Phoenix, Arizona 85003
- Coordinates: 33.4507°N 112.0747°W
- Construction started: November 2005
- Completed: 2008
- Opening: February 2011 (rentals)
- Cost: US$70 million

Height
- Roof: 380 ft (120 m)
- Top floor: 34

Technical details
- Floor count: 34

Design and construction
- Architect: Tucker Sadler Architects
- Developer: Grace Communities
- Structural engineer: PK Associates LLC
- Main contractor: The Weitz Company

44 Monroe is a US$70 million, 523,619-square-foot (48,645.8 m^{2}) residential high-rise building, located at the northeast corner of Monroe Street and First Avenue in Downtown Phoenix, Arizona. The 34-story tower is currently Arizona's tallest residential structure.

== History ==
The location of 44 Monroe was formerly home to an 11-story office building a small quarter of a city square block. It opened in 1960 and served as the headquarters of The Arizona Bank from 1960 until 1976, when it moved to 101 North 1st Avenue. The building then had other tenants. In 2004, the long-vacant building completed in 1961, was in the process of being remodeled into residential condominiums called Monroe Place Lofts. High demand quickly sold out the 60-unit project. In May 2005, Grace Communities announced the existing building would be razed and in its place a 34-story tower would be erected and named 44 Monroe, the site's address. In late 2005, the Arizona Bank Building was demolished and 44 Monroe began its construction. On April 6, 2006, Grace communities hosted a "Going Vertical" party signaling the tower's foundation was complete and construction would now be above ground. In the summer of 2007, 44 Monroe topped out. Fall 2008 saw the completion of 44 Monroe.

As of August 2009, the completed project was 5% occupied. In September 2009, its primary lender, Corus Bank, based in Chicago, was taken over by the FDIC, and in January 2010 the project was headed for a trustees' sale and likely foreclosure. Spring 2011 saw a different side of the market as the tower's units were converted into rental apartments. As of October 2011, 86% of the tower's units had been filled. A strong rental market and high demand in the downtown area has further improved the tower's troubled history.

== Design ==
The project's exterior and interior design were inspired by a painting by artist Jennifer J.L. Jones named "Five Elements," which incorporates the five Chinese elements of nature — earth, wood, water, metal, and fire. The elements will be expressed as five vertical fins on the front of the structure's façade, with the pattern to be repeated throughout the building's interior. The building will feature seven floors of above-ground parking and 196 residential units, ranging in size from 780 to 4,800 square feet (450 m^{2}). Residential unit prices range from $480,000 to $3.2 million.

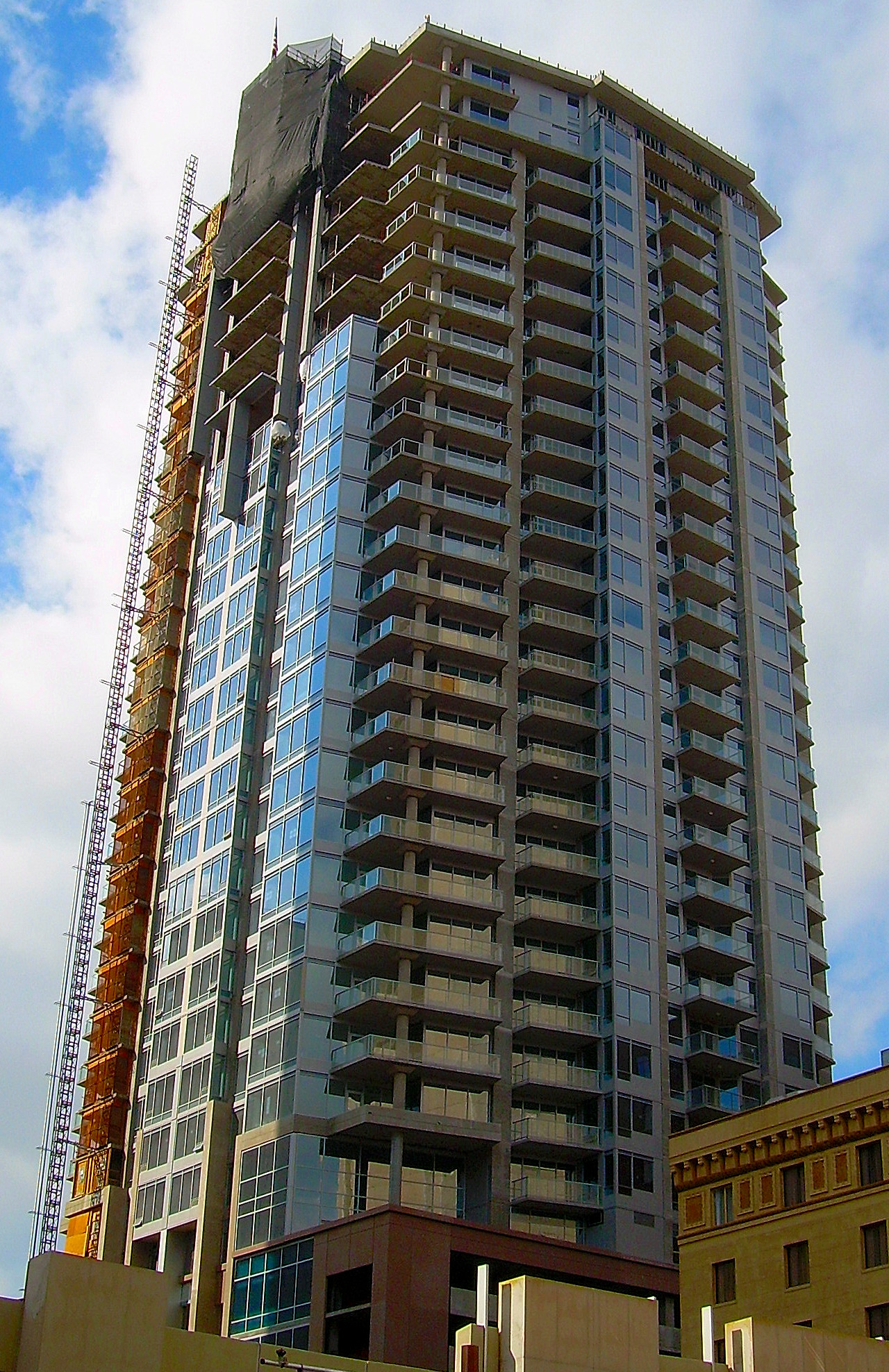
44 Monroe in 2008, nearing completion

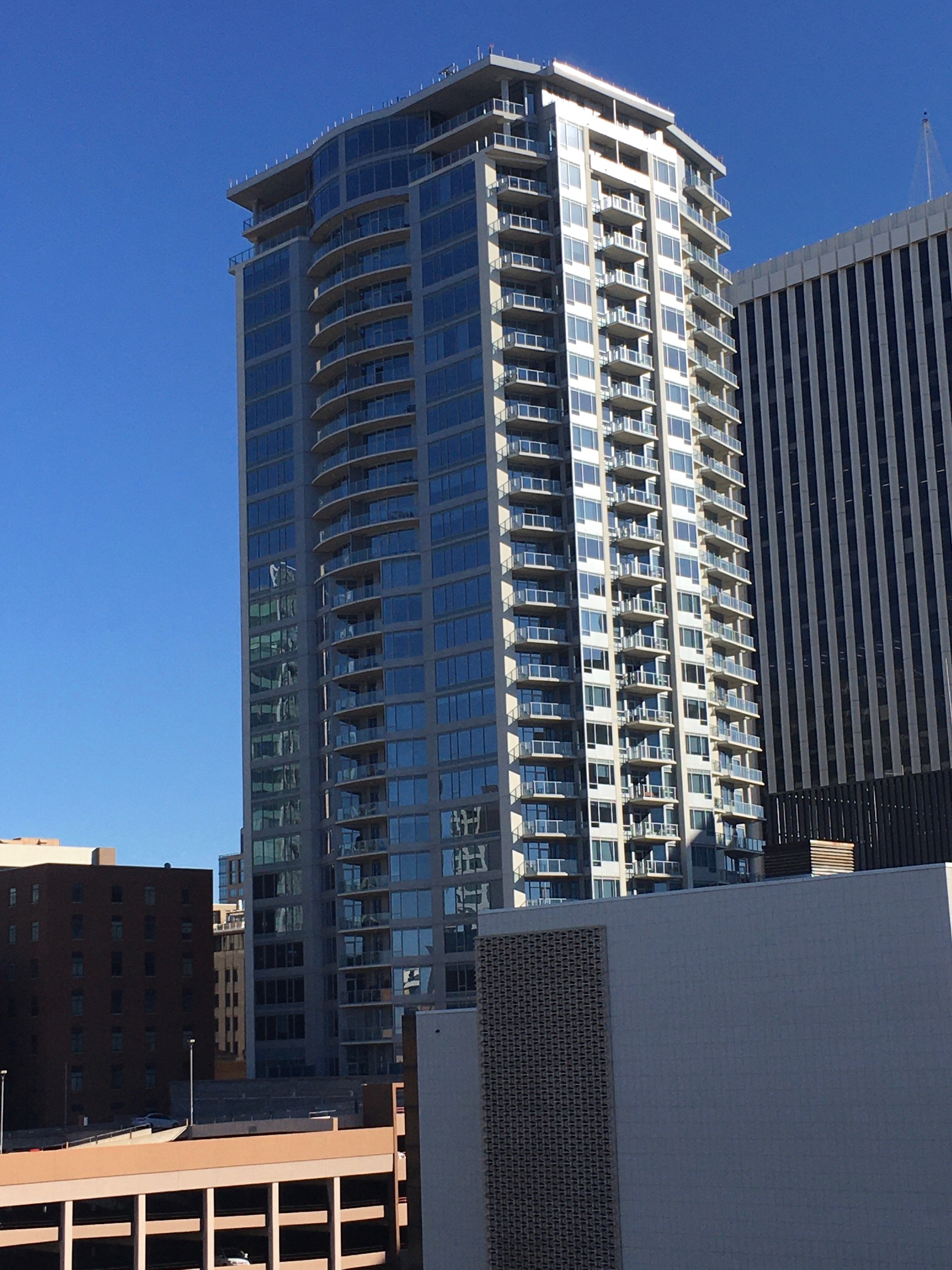
A view from the northeast of 44 Monroe in Downtown Phoenix

== See also ==
- List of tallest buildings in Arizona
