= Philips Plaza =

Office building in Nashville, Tennessee, US

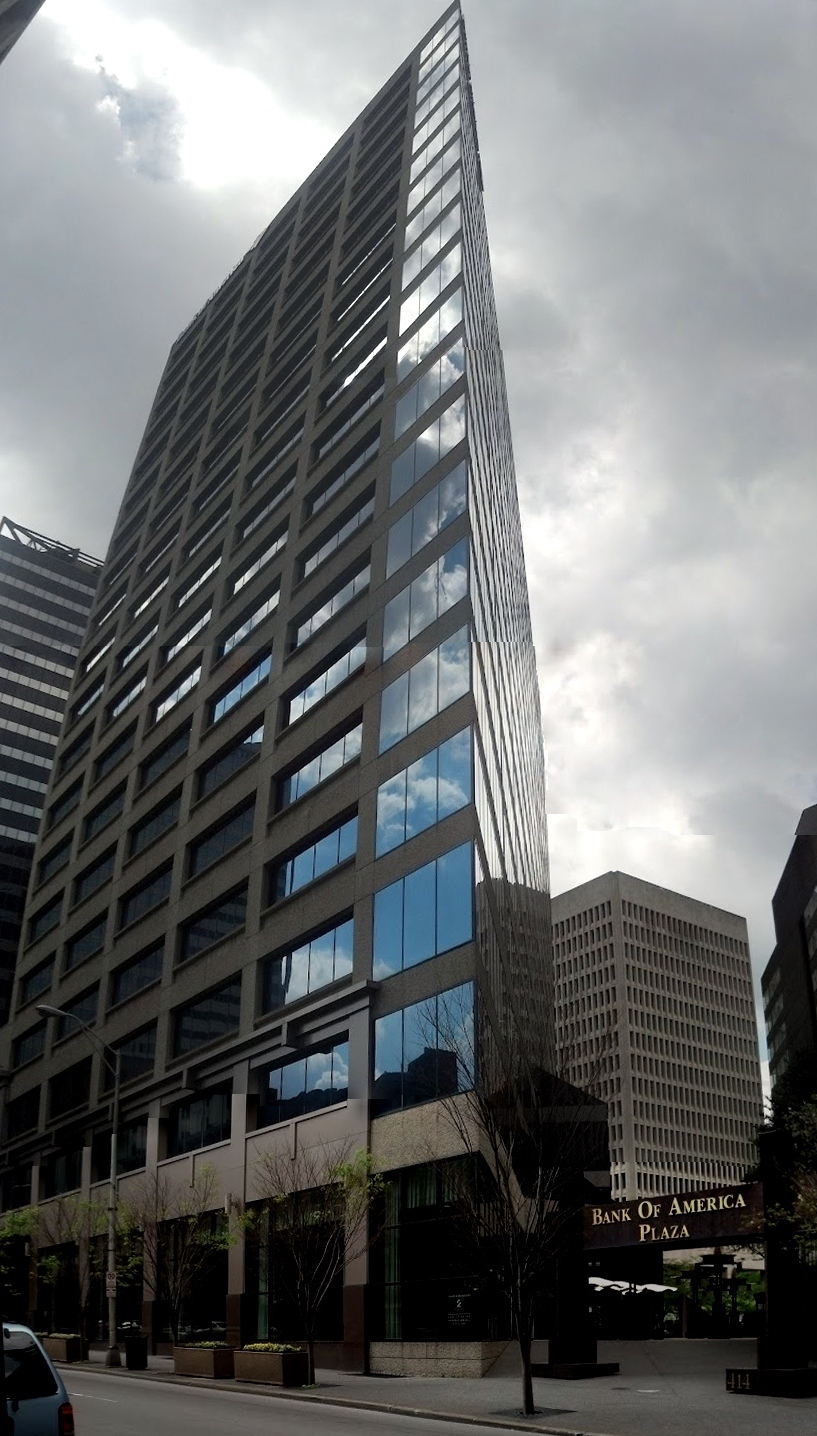
- Interactive map of the Philips Plaza area

General information
- Status: Completed
- Type: Office
- Location: 414 Union Street; Nashville, Tennessee; United States
- Coordinates: 36°9′53.96″N 86°46′51.56″W
- Opening: 1977
- Owner: Lingerfelt CommonWealth Partners.

Height
- Roof: 291 ft (89 m)

Technical details
- Floor count: 20
- Floor area: 436,399
- Lifts/elevators: 8

Design and construction
- Architects: Thompson, Ventulett, Stainback & Associates, Inc.

The Philips Plaza is a high-rise office building in downtown Nashville, Tennessee, United States, which was renamed from the Bank of America Plaza in 2018. Philips Plaza is the 43rd tallest building in Nashville, with 20 stories and a height of 291 ft (89 m).

In 2002, the building's owners, Parkway Properties, announced a complete renovation to the building, significantly altering its appearance. Included in the renovation was the installation of new, blue tinted glass, replacing its original red tinted glass, and the construction of a new plaza around the building. There is a statue of Chet Atkins outside the corner entrance.

The building was constructed in conjunction with the Doubletree Hotel building on the same lot, which is much smaller at 12 stories and 124 ft. There is a landscaped plaza connecting the two structures in the middle.

The building was acquired in July 2013 by Virginia-based Commercial Real Estate company, Lingerfelt Companies.

== See also ==
- List of tallest buildings in Nashville
