= Hyatt Regency Phoenix =

Convention hotel in Phoenix, Arizona

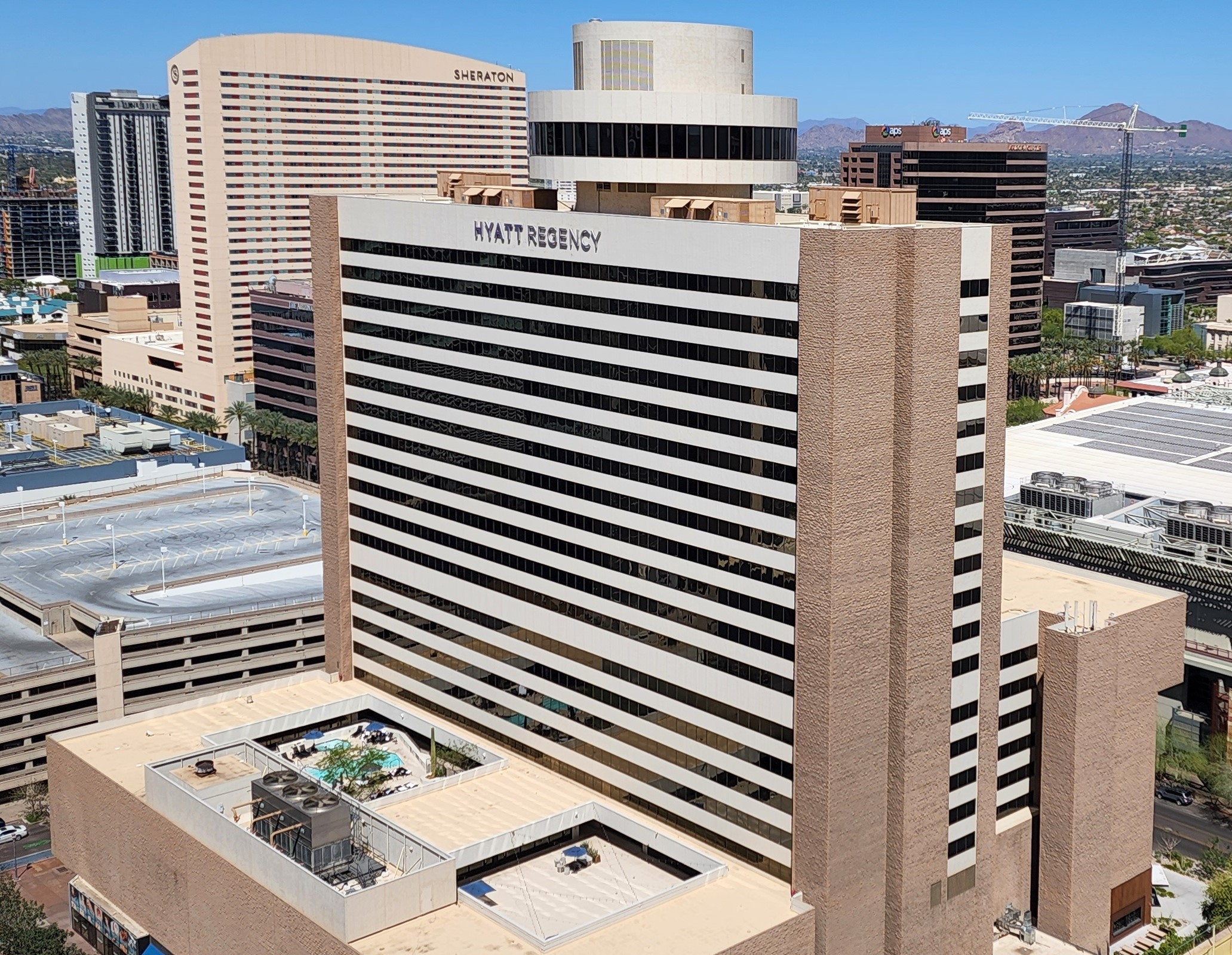
- Hyatt Regency Phoenix
- Interactive map of the Hyatt Regency Phoenix area
- Hotel chain: Hyatt Hotels Corporation

General information
- Status: Completed
- Location: Downtown Phoenix, 122 North 2nd Street, Phoenix, United States
- Coordinates: 33.4499°N 112.0718°W
- Groundbreaking: 1973
- Completed: 1976

Height
- Roof: 317 ft (97 m)
- Top floor: 24

Technical details
- Floor count: 24
- Lifts/elevators: 8

Design and construction
- Architect: Charles Luckman and Associates
- Main contractor: Chanen Construction Company

Website
- https://phoenix.regency.hyatt.com/

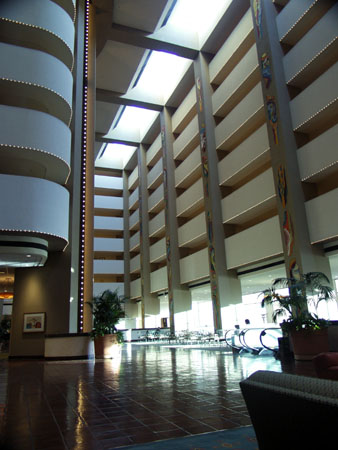
The 8 story atrium.

The Hyatt Regency Phoenix is a convention hotel in Downtown Phoenix, Arizona, United States. It is 317 feet (97 m) tall and has 24 floors. It was completed in 1976. The top floor has a revolving restaurant. It was designed by Charles Luckman and Associates to complement the Phoenix Civic Plaza (now called Phoenix Convention Center) and Phoenix Symphony Hall. The building was constructed by Chanen Construction Company. The hotel's façade is clad in textured split ribbed concrete block.

The hotel lobby and restaurants occupy the main level. The second floor features meeting rooms and an additional restaurant while an atrium rises 8 stories. Floors 9 through 21 house guest rooms. Floors 22 and 23 house mechanical equipment. The Compass Restaurant sits atop the hotel on floor 24. The Compass is Arizona's only revolving restaurant. The building has two enclosed guest elevators and three "scenic elevators", which glide upward from the lobby, through the atrium, then through the building's exterior, overlooking downtown Phoenix and Phoenix Sky Harbor International Airport.

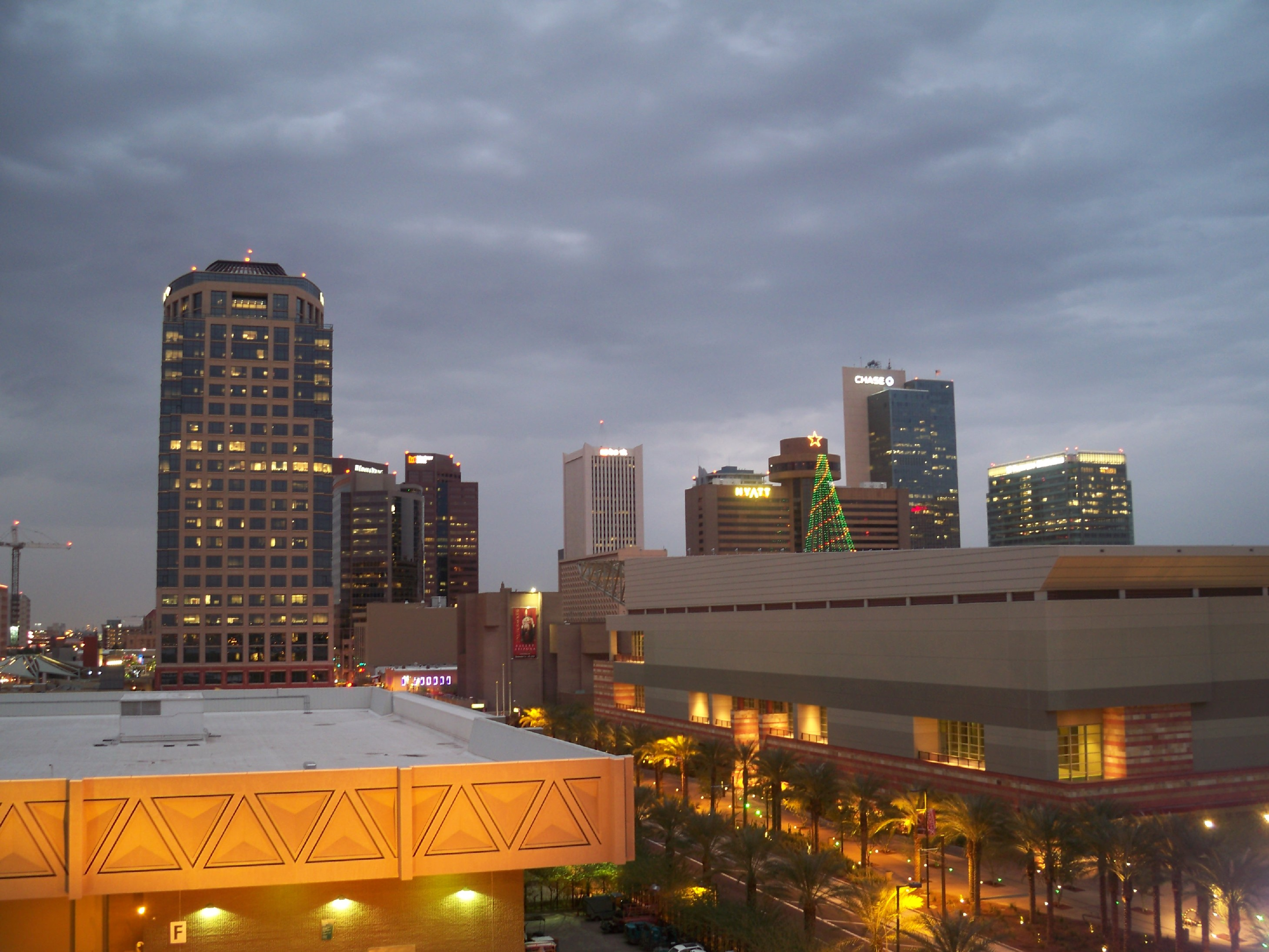
Hyatt Regency Phoenix Christmas Tree

The hotel has 693 guest rooms, two restaurants, a grab n' go market, a swimming pool,42,000 square feet (3,900 m^{2}) of meeting space, and a retail shop.

The Hyatt Regency Phoenix was chosen by the NFL as the headquarters hotel for Super Bowl XLII which was played in nearby Glendale in February 2008.

On July 1, 2008, the Hyatt Regency Phoenix was sold for $96 million to Los Angeles–based DiNapoli Capital Partners.
