= Bank of America Building (Athens, Georgia) =

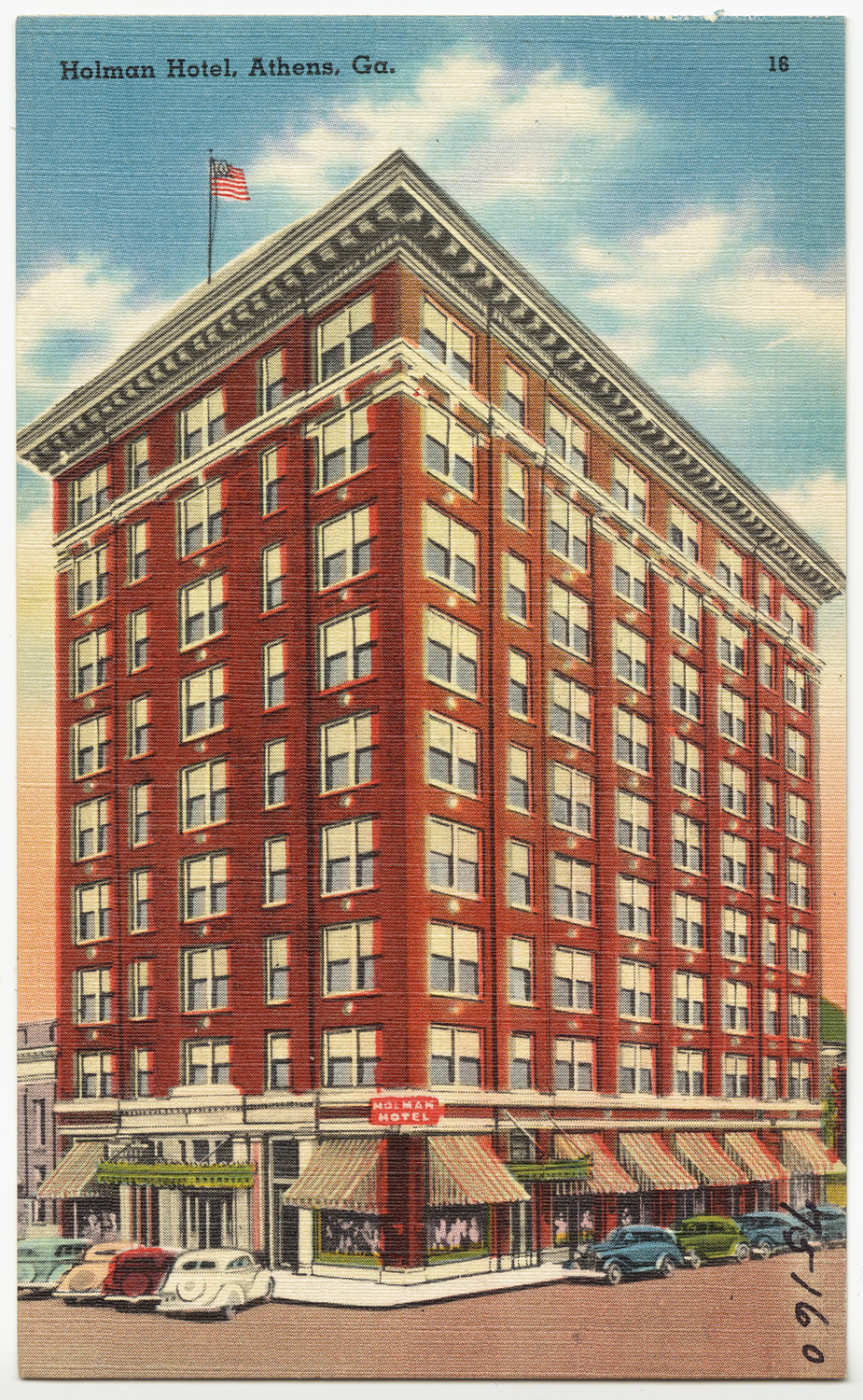
- Postcard of the Holman Hotel

General information
- Type: commercial/financial
- Location: 110 East Clayton Street, Athens, Georgia
- Completed: 1914

Height
- Roof: 146 ft (45 m)
- Top floor: 120 ft (37 m)

Technical details
- Floor count: 9
- Lifts/elevators: 2

The Bank of America Building, formerly known as the Holman Hotel, is a commercial and financial building in Athens, Georgia. It is the tallest building in the city with 10 floors. The building was originally designed as an office building, but it was later converted for hotel use, and again in the 1960s it was remodeled in the Colonial revival style for banking purposes. Inside the building, fire insurance maps show that the building, not including the penthouse, has a height of 120 feet. It is also the official headquarters for Bank of America for the Athens area.
