= U.S. Bank Center (Phoenix) =

High-rise office building

US Bank Center Phoenix
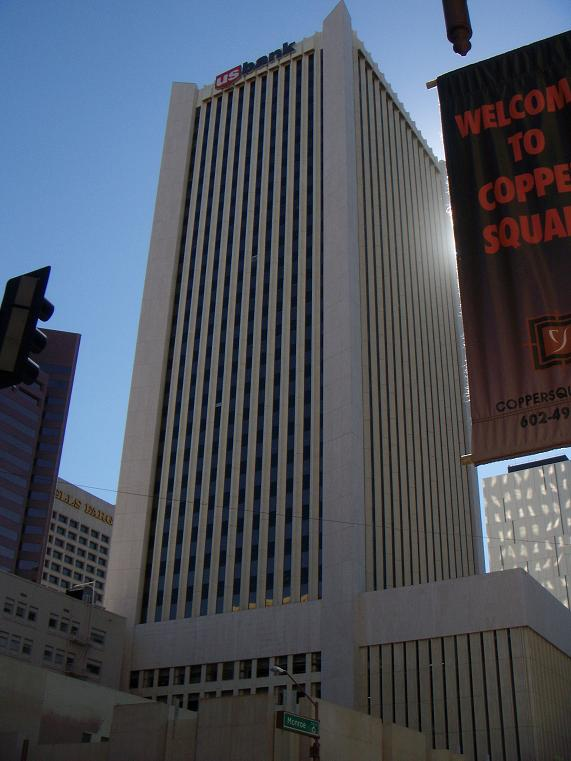
- Looking up at the US Bank Center

General information
- Status: Completed
- Type: Office
- Architectural style: International style
- Location: 101 North 1st Avenue; Phoenix, Arizona
- Coordinates: 33.4498°N 112.0748°W
- Groundbreaking: 1974
- Completed: 1976

Height
- Roof: 407 ft (124 m)
- Top floor: 31

Technical details
- Floor count: 31
- Floor area: 386,263 ft^{2} (35,885.0 m^{2})

Design and construction
- Architects: Thomas F. Marshall Associates (Architect), Schoenberger, Straub, Florence & Associates (Associate), Varney, Sexton, Sydnor Associates (Consulting)
- Main contractor: M. M. Sundt Construction Co. (general contractor), Del E. Webb Corporation (project manager)

The US Bank Center is a high-rise office building located in Phoenix, Arizona. It is the second tallest building in the state of Arizona. Built in 1976, it is 407 feet (124 m) tall.

== History ==
The design was released in 1973 by Thomas F. Marshall who at the time worked for the Tulsa Oklahoma firm of Kelley-Marshall & Associates. In 1974 Marshall formed his own firm of Thomas F. Marshall Associates. Associate architect was Schoenberger, Straub, Florence & Associates of Phoenix. Varney, Sexton, Sydnor Associates were consulting architects on the project. Ground was broken in 1974 and the tower was constructed by the M. M. Sundt Construction Company of Phoenix. In 1975 when the building was about half complete the Del E. Webb Realty & Management Company a subsidiary of the Del E. Webb Corporation was named the leasing and property manager. The Webb firm also served as project manager to Sundt for the last year of construction. When it was built, it served as the headquarters for Arizona Bancwest, parent company of The Arizona Bank, which moved from a building at Monroe Street and First Avenue. After Arizona passed legislation allowing for interstate banking), The Arizona Bank was acquired by Los Angeles–based Security Pacific Bank in 1986 (itself in turn acquired by Bank of America in 1992). Bank of America then occupied the tower until 2000 when the Bank of America Tower was built at the Collier Center. In January 2005, this tower was renamed U.S. Bank Center and underwent a modest renovation to reflect the building's newest and largest tenant. New ground-floor restaurants were added and the building was repainted; the restaurants have since closed. The new U.S. Bank signs were installed in February 2005. In September 2022, U.S. Bank left the tower, and the signs were removed shortly thereafter.

The building is designed in the International Style. Above the lobby sits a seven level garage. The tower rises an additional 23 floors for a total of 31 above ground floors.

The building was also the first high rise in Phoenix to be built with an automatic fire sprinkler system.

== See also ==
- List of tallest buildings in Arizona
- List of tallest buildings in Phoenix
