= 100 South Charles Street =

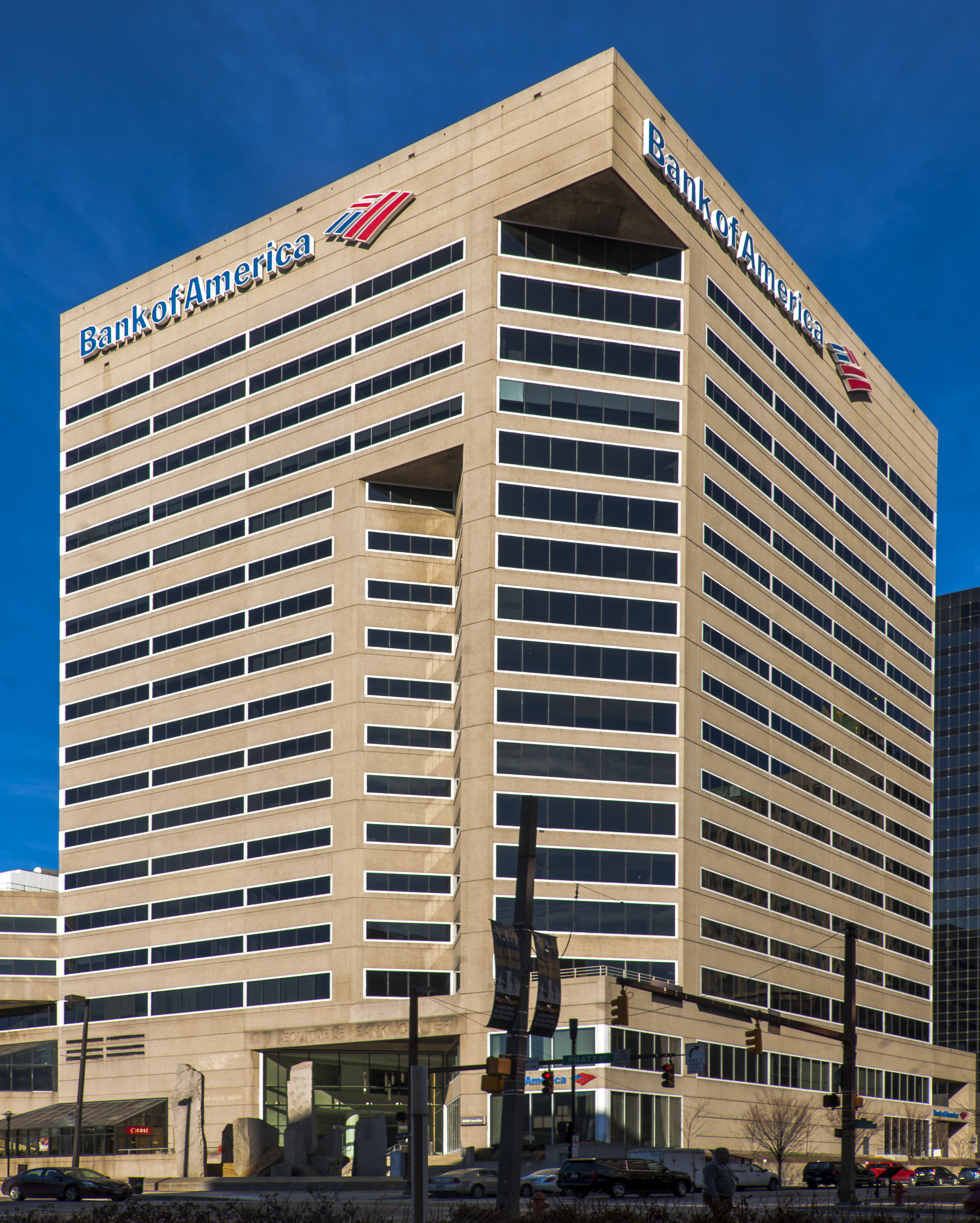
- Building from across the intersection of South Charles and East Pratt streets, 2018
- Interactive map of the 100 South Charles Street area
- Alternative names: NationsBank Center; Convention Center Mall

General information
- Type: Commercial office
- Location: 100 South Charles Street; Baltimore, Maryland
- Coordinates: 39°17′13.4″N 76°36′56″W
- Completed: 1965

Height
- Height: 232 feet (71 m)

Technical details
- Floor count: 18
- Floor area: 350,000 square feet (33,000 m^{2})

100 South Charles Street, formerly the Bank of America Center and the Equitable Bank Center, is an 18-story highrise building in Baltimore, Maryland at 100 South Charles Street.
