= F. Q. Story Neighborhood Historic District =

Historic district in Arizona, United States

- Story, F. Q., Neighborhood Historic District
- U.S. National Register of Historic Places
- U.S. Historic district
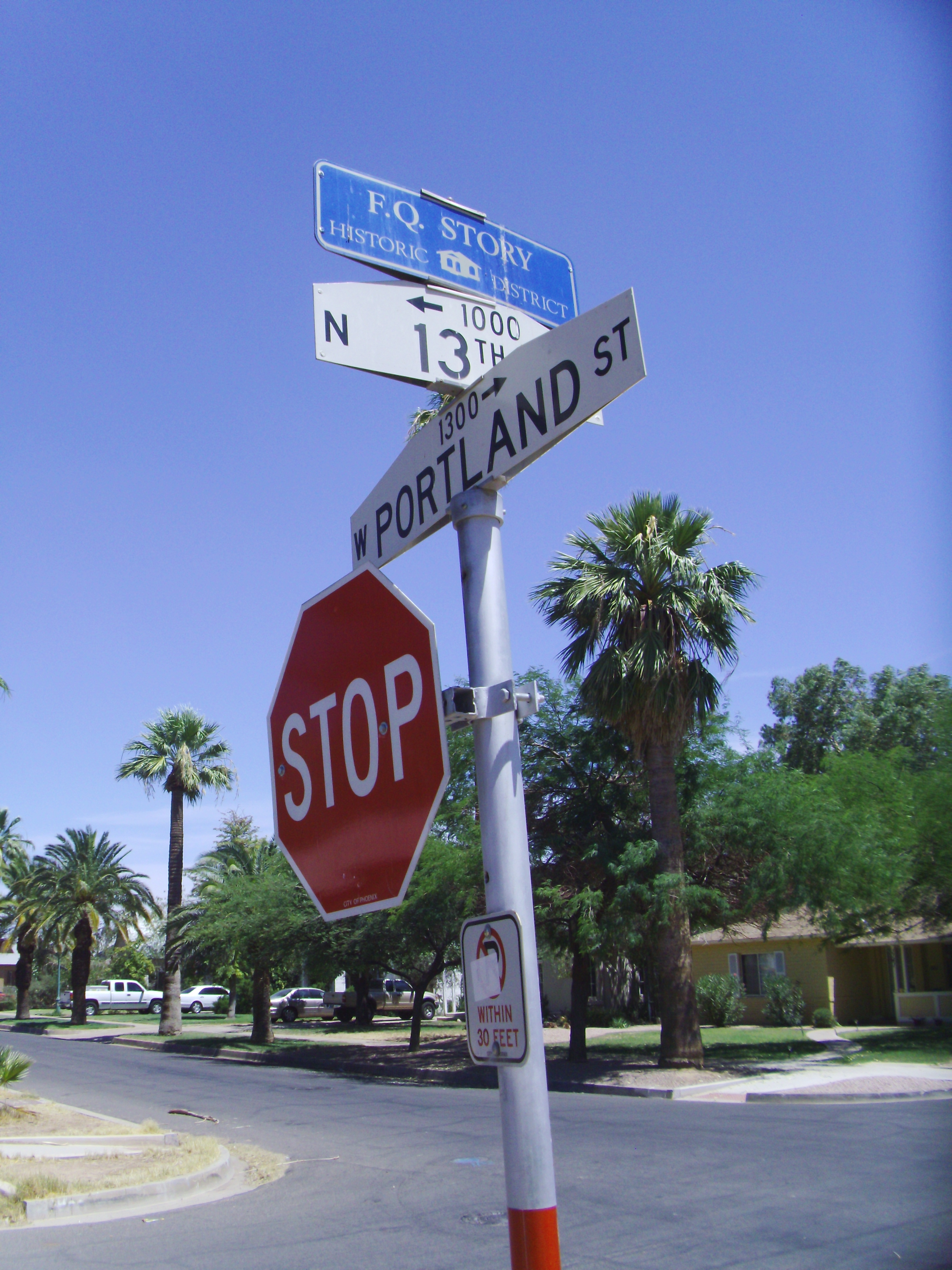

- Location within Arizona Location within the United States
- Location: McDowell Rd., Seventh Ave., Roosevelt St. and Sixteenth Ave., Phoenix, Arizona
- Coordinates: 33°27′41″N 112°5′15″W
- Area: 120 acres (49 ha)
- Architect: Multiple
- Architectural style: Bungalow/Craftsman, Late 19th And 20th Century Revivals, Modern Movement
- NRHP reference No.: 88000212
- Added to NRHP: March 24, 1988

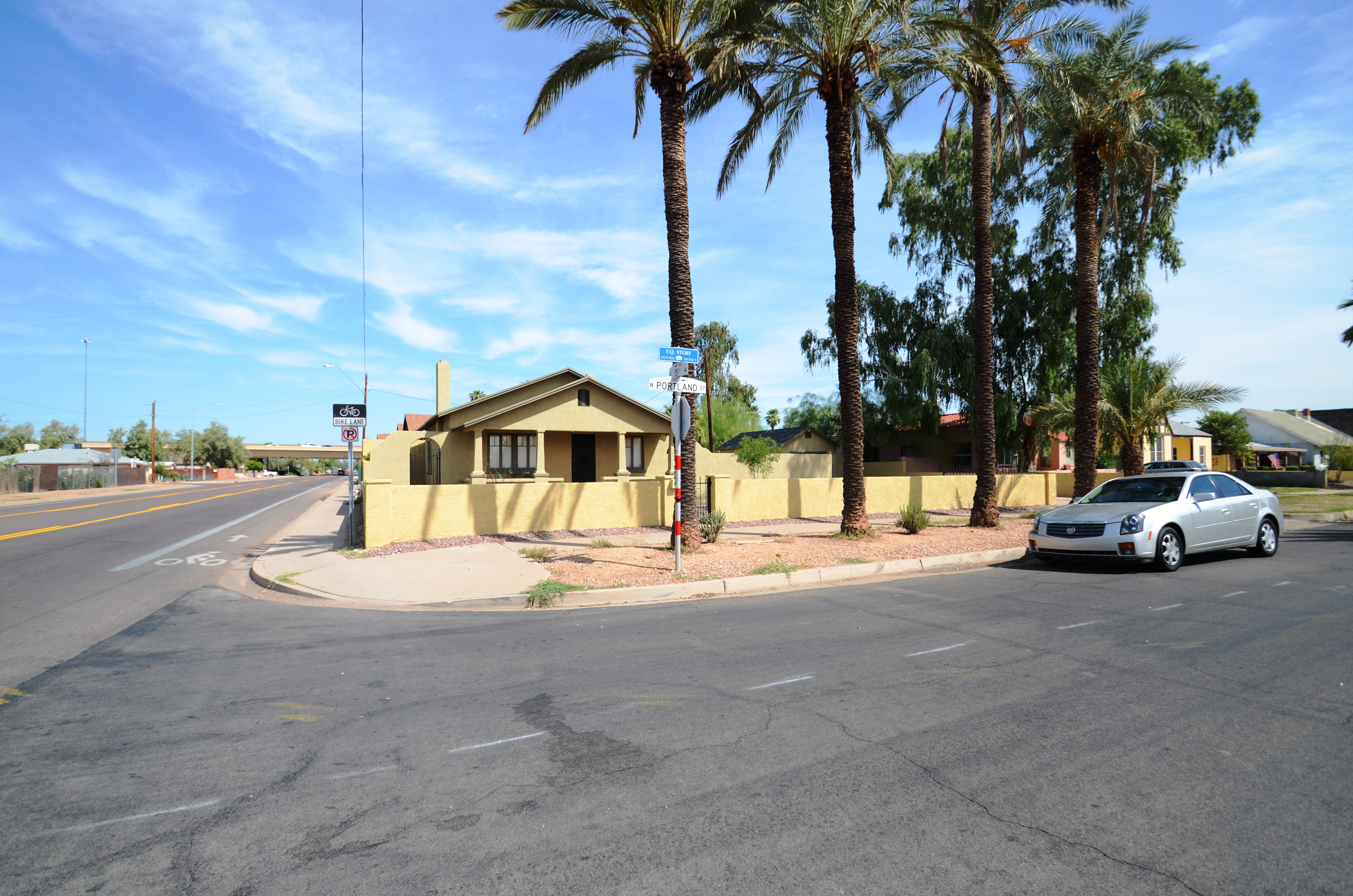

The F. Q. Story Neighborhood Historic District is located in central Phoenix, Arizona, United States. The neighborhood runs from McDowell Road south to Roosevelt Street and from Seventh Avenue west to Grand Avenue. The neighborhood as well as many of the individual houses are listed on the National Register of Historic Places.

The F.Q. Story neighborhood consists of 602 homes that were constructed from the late 1920s through the late 1940s. A variety of architectural styles, including Spanish Colonial Revival, English Tudor, Craftsman bungalows as well as transitional ranch are represented within the neighborhood.

== Francis Quarles Story ==
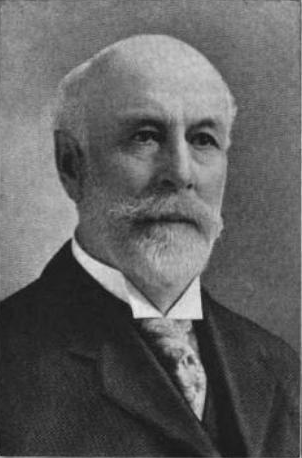
Francis Quarles Story

In 1887, Francis Quarles Story, a Boston wool merchant whose ill health had taken him to California a decade before, purchased the area that is today the F.Q. Story Historic District. He had settled in Los Angeles County, studied the cultivation of citrus, planted orange groves, and is credited with founding the national advertising campaign that made the Sunkist Orange famous. Active in many educational and conservation endeavors, F.Q. Story was a director and president of the Los Angeles Chamber of Commerce and a tireless booster of commercial and industrial enterprises in California and Arizona. Story and other prominent southern California landowners expanded into the Salt River Valley of Arizona in the late 1880s, investing in land and promoting both agricultural and townsite development. Although he never lived in Phoenix, Story was involved in numerous projects, such as the design and construction of the 100-foot (30 m) wide Grand Avenue thoroughfare in 1887 and the subsequent building of its streetcar line. In the early 1900s, Story was influential in the founding of the Grand Avenue and University Additions, but their development was disappointing. In spite of having announced in 1910 plans to subdivide the 200-acre (0.8 km^{2}) parcel, which would become the Story neighborhood, he sold the entire parcel to the Phoenix firm of Jordan, Grace and Phelps in 1919.

== Promotion ==
In 1920, when development of what is now the F.Q. Story Historic District began, Phoenix had a population of 29,000; almost six times what it had been at the turn-of-the-century. Grand Avenue had been built to link central Phoenix with the thriving agricultural communities of Glendale and Peoria. Like the nearby Roosevelt neighborhood, Story was advertised as a streetcar suburb, being close to the Grand Avenue and Kenilworth car lines. As in other developments oriented to the street car, Story was laid out with narrow, deep lots. The streetcar line at the eastern edge of the neighborhood clustered the initial houses. By the middle of the decade, as the automobile became more common, houses located further west began to incorporate detached garages and side-yard port coheres appeared. Their presence reflects the growing impact of the automobile on architecture and suburban American life by the mid-1920s.

When subdivision of the F.Q. Story Addition began, it was described in advertisements in the Arizona Republican in March 1920 as "The Real Estate Event of the Season!" and "The Place, the Thing, and the Time you have been waiting for." Advertising boasted that the developers "expect to sell this entire tract within thirty days." In spite of the hype, only one house was built in all of 1921. This was due to the fact that the area lay directly in the flood way of Cave Creek, which in 1921, inundated the entire western end of the city and put two feet of muddy water on the first floor of the state capitol just a mile to the south. There were no deaths, but property damages were severe and estimated to have exceeded the million-dollar mark.

== Residential development ==
After Cave Creek Dam was completed in 1923, thirteen more homes were built, and in January 1924, the Dwight B. Heard Investment Company reopened the original Story Addition. The newly formed partnership of Lane-Smith opened North Story, and by 1926, a total of 113 homes had been built on streets from Roosevelt and McDowell between 7th and 9th Avenues. Both sections had a requirement that buildings cost a minimum of $5000. The subdivision also had gas and electrical service. Kenilworth School had opened in 1920, and in 1926, Franklin School was built on McDowell at 17th Avenue.

== Development accelerates ==
The last development phase of the Story Addition began in 1927 when "New Story" opened, covering the 80 acres (320,000 m^{2}) from 11th to I 5th Avenues, between McDowell Road and Roosevelt Street. At $3000 to $4000, building restrictions were slightly lower here and duplexes were permitted in certain sections.

In July 1927, the developers, Lane-Smith Investment Company, encouraged sales by having A.F. Wasielewski Construction Company construct a "model home" at 1106 West Lynwood, a novel idea for the period. By September, forty more homes had been built. At the same time, the remaining westerly portion of F.Q. Story's land was opened as "West Story" by developers Cowley, Higgins and Delph Company. It was also known as Franklin Addition, named for the new primary school nearby. Building restrictions were more modest still, just $2500 and $2200, which allowed working families to build in the area.

Development hit its peak in 1930 with the construction of 133 new houses, only to falter as the effects of the Great Depression hit Phoenix. Construction declined, but by 1938, approximately seventy-five percent of the F.Q. Story Addition had been developed.

== Typical Phoenix neighborhood ==
People of wealth and influence, who bought large blocks of land for resale, never intending to live in the area, invested in the F.Q. Story neighborhood as a speculative venture. In its historic period, it was a typical middle-class neighborhood. In the eastern sections with the higher building restrictions, the earliest Story residents were mainly of white-collar status professional people such as physicians, lawyers, presidents and owners of small to medium-sized companies. On the west side were government personnel, sales people of all kinds, and a number of contractors who built in the area. All three partners in the realty company of Cowley, Higgins and Delph lived in "West Story," as did a number of O'Malley Lumber Company employees.

The people who were first drawn to the neighborhood were considered one of its primary attractions. At one point during its development, the Price & Price Investment Company ran an advertisement listing the names and occupations of nearly all Story Addition property owners in an attempt to encourage sales. Homes were fairly small and, even at their most lavish, relatively inexpensive in comparison with some of the other emerging Phoenix neighborhoods of this era.

== Neighborhood commercial activity ==
The developers of Story Addition in the 1927-28 period also planned for commercial activities in the neighborhood. Commercial buildings were constructed in eight locations. Characteristic of commercial development of the period, these buildings were located on corner lots on McDowell, Roosevelt, and Grand Avenue, the chief thoroughfares.

The only building constructed during this time, which remains intact in the neighborhood today, is the Pay'n Takit Market at 7th Avenue and Roosevelt. This small grocery was the twenty-third store opened up by the Pay'n Takit Grocery Company. A Phoenix chain founded in 1917, they promoted the innovative concept of self-service or cash and carry." The importance of this early commercial building to the neighborhood is recognized with its individual listing on the National Register of Historic Places.

== Architectural styles ==
Much of the architectural significance of the F.Q. Story Historic District relates to its representation of the increasing popularity of period styles, which was typical of early twentieth century American residential design. The Bungalow style prevailed in the eastern sections developed in the early 1920s. Period Revival houses - those that use the form and ornamentation of earlier architectural styles - prevailed by the mid-1920s. Spanish Colonial Revival and Tudor Revival homes were the most popular, but examples of other Revival styles, such as English and Norman Cottage, Mediterranean, Pueblo, Mission, and Neoclassical are common. Art Modern, Ranch Style and Prairie houses were also scattered through the area.

Spanish Colonial Revival houses take their characteristics from the Southwestern architectural tradition. Identifying features include flat or low-pitched roofs with little or no overhang, red tile roof shingles, prominent arches over doors, windows and porches, and an asymmetrical stuccoed facade.

In contrast, Tudor Revival homes draw from the medieval architecture of Europe. These dwellings feature steeply pitched gabled roofs, and are often ornamented with half timbering. They also are identifiable by their picturesque massing, multiple pane window groupings and massive brick chimneys.

== Significance ==
Today, as in the past, the F.Q. Story Historic District is a neighborhood characterized by diversity. Historically, it remains an important expression of the people and the building practices that established Phoenix as a progressive twentieth century city. The form of the neighborhood, the placement and arrangement of the buildings, and its distinctive landscaping all contribute to a character that reflects the economies, technology and popular tastes of a bygone era. Story is architecturally important because it displays a wide range of historic styles from the 1920s and 1930s that illustrate the changing architectural trends of the period.
