= 540 West Madison =

Office skyscraper in Chicago, Illinois

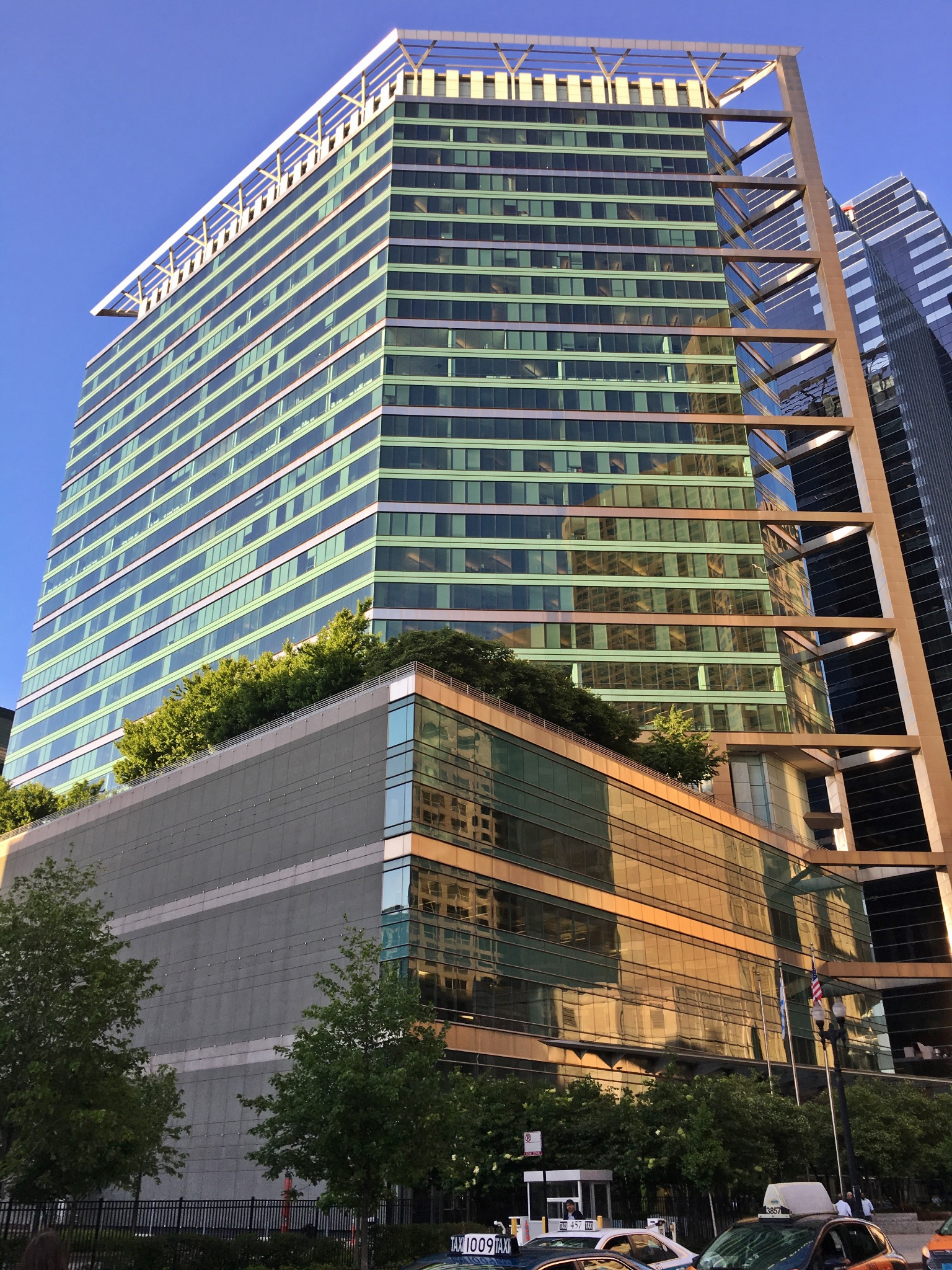
- Interactive map of the 540 West Madison area

General information
- Location: 540 West Madison; Chicago, Illinois, US
- Coordinates: 41.8826°N 87.6416°W
- Construction started: 2001
- Completed: 2003
- Owner: 540 West Madison Owner LLC
- Landlord: Jones Lang LaSalle

Height
- Roof: 453 ft (138 m)

Technical details
- Floor count: 29
- Lifts/elevators: 12

Design and construction
- Architect: DeStefano and Partners

540 West Madison, formerly known as ABN AMRO Plaza, is an office building located in the West Loop area of Chicago, Illinois, United States. The building was built for ABN AMRO, parent company of Chicago financial institution LaSalle Bank. To the east sits Citicorp Center building and to the south, residential-complex of Presidential Towers. In the base of the building, there is a Starbucks Coffee and a restaurant bar, Slightly Toasted.

The building is anchored by West Madison Street, West Washington Street, North Jefferson Street and North Clinton streets. It was completed in 2003. The building has a total of 29 floors that span 453 feet (138 m). Cost are estimated to have been near US$387 million. It took approximately three years to erect. The goal was to bring together all office workers in Chicago who comprised the staff of the five buildings the company occupied previous to the construction of the Plaza.

When the building was acquired by Bank of America as part of the company's acquisition of LaSalle Bank from ABN AMRO in the spring of 2008, the green and yellow shield icon was removed from the building's top. In December 2012, Bank of America sold the building to a group of New York investors for $350 million. It was the largest office transaction in Chicago that year, both in price and cost per square foot.
