= List of tallest buildings in Arizona =

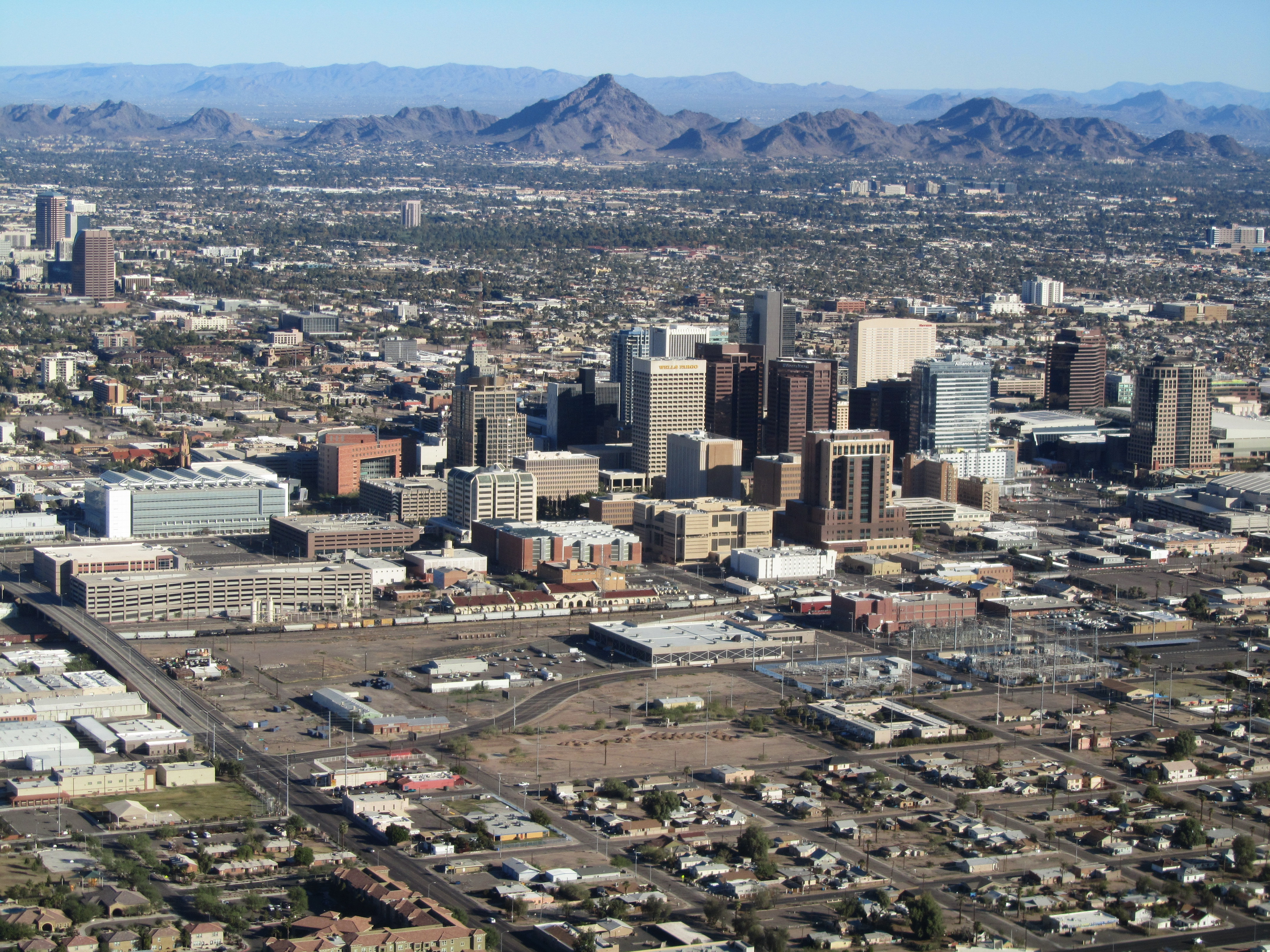
Aerial of downtown Phoenix, Arizona. (November 27, 2011)

- Note: Table widths too wide for most users; tables forced to 1920px to prevent crowding.

The following is a chronological list of buildings in the state of Arizona that are taller than 7-stories or have historical relevance, grouped by city.

== By city ==
=== Casa Grande ===
Was the state’s tallest building upon completion

Completed y/m/d	Name	Image	Height	Floors	Architect	Cost USD	Area sq ft	Usage	Status	Notes
1964	Francisco Grande Resort Tower		109 ft (33 m)	9	(United States) Nicholas G. Sakellar			Hotel	Complete	Built as an addition to the Spring Training home of the San Francisco Giants. The hotel played host to celebrities such as John Wayne and Pat Boone.

=== Chandler ===
Was the state’s tallest building upon completion

Completed y/m/d	Name	Image	Height	Floors	Architect	Cost USD	Area sq ft	Usage	Status	Notes
	Chandler Elevation			10	(United States) DMJM			Hotel	Demolished	Construction began in 2005 to build a Marriott Renaissance ClubSport Hotel, work was halted on the 7th floor in April 2006 when the developer filed for bankruptcy. The structure was demolished in 2014 by its new owners.
2009-10-30	Wild Horse Pass Hotel & Casino		120 ft (36 m)	10	(United States) JCJ Architecture	$200,000,000		Hotel / Casino	Complete	
2021-1	Wild Horse Pass Hotel & Casino Sunrise Tower		150 ft (45 m)	11	(United States) Friedmutter Group	$143,000,000		Hotel / Casino	Complete	

=== Flagstaff ===
Was the state’s tallest building upon completion

Completed y/m/d	Name	Image	Height	Floors	Architect	Cost USD	Area sq ft	Usage	Status	Notes
1967-1-20	Sechrist Hall		109 ft (33 m)	9	(United States) Guirey, Srnka & Arnold	$1,623,135	118,800	Residential	Complete	Tallest building in northern Arizona.

=== Mesa ===
Was the state’s tallest building upon completion

Completed y/m/d	Name	Image	Height	Floors	Architect	Cost USD	Area sq ft	Usage	Status	Notes
1984	Courtyard Towers		137 ft (41 m)	13				Residential	Complete	
1984	Phoenix Marriott Mesa		120 ft (36 m)	12	(United States) Coover Saemisch Anderson Architects			Hotel	Complete	
1985	Bank of America Financial Plaza		224 ft (68 m)	16	(United States) Langdon Wilson		310,000	Office	Complete	Formerly the Western Savings Building, and later the Bank of America Building.
1985-9-28	Hilton Phoenix East/Mesa		105 ft (32 m)	8		$30,000,000		Hotel	Complete	Originally known as The Hilton Pavilion.

=== Phoenix ===
Was the state’s tallest building upon completion

Completed y/m/d	Name	Image	Height	Floors	Architect	Cost USD	Area sq ft	Usage	Status	Notes
1915	Barrister Place		77 ft (23 m)	7	(United States) F. C. Hurst				Complete	Originally the Jefferson Hotel. This building was used in the opening scene of Alfred Hitchcock's 1960 movie Psycho, where Marion and Sam spend their lunchbreak. The building is currently being converted to condos.
1920	Heard Building		103 ft (31 m)	7	(United States) Llewellyn A. Parker		75,000	Office	Complete	It was the first high-rise building to be erected in Phoenix and held the title of tallest building in Arizona for four years until the completion of the Luhrs Building in 1924. The buildings facade was modernized in 1937.
1924-2	Luhrs Building		138 ft (42 m)	11	(United States) Trost & Trost	$500,000 - $900,000	100,000	Office / Retail	Complete	L-shaped building that held the title of tallest building in Arizona for almost five years until the opening of the Westward Ho in January 1929.
1928	Security Building		108 ft (32 m)	8	(United States) Curlett & Beelman	$600,000	230,000	Office	Complete	
1928-3-20	Hotel San Carlos		86 ft (26 m)	7	(United States) G. Whitecross Ritchie	$350,000		Hotel	Complete	Opened in March 1928 and has operated as a hotel since.
1928-9-20	Westward Ho		208 ft (63 m)	16	(United States) H. Rafael Lake (United States) Louis L. Dorr	$2,500,000		Residential	Complete	A 16-story building that opened in 1929, it held the title of tallest building in Arizona for over 30 years until the completion of the Guaranty Bank Building in 1960.
1929-3-2	Luhrs Tower		185 ft (56 m)	15	(United States) Trost & Trost	$400,000 - $2,000,000		Office	Complete	
1930-10-5 / 1931-1-31	Orpheum Lofts			11	(United States) Lescher & Mahoney	$650,000 - $900,000	137,734	Residential / Retail	Complete	Originally called the Title and Trust Building.
1931-12	Professional Building		171 ft (52 m)	12	(United States) Morgan, Walls & Clements	$759,000 - $800,000	157,000	Vacant	Complete	Upon completion in February 1932, the Valley Bank and Trust Company moved into the bottom three floors with medical offices occupying the top seven.
1956-1-21	University Center			9	(United States) William D. Reed	$3,000,000 - $4,500,000		Education	Complete	Originally the First National Bank of Arizona Building, it has since been turned into the Phoenix campus of Arizona State University.
1957-8	Phoenix Towers		176 ft (53 m)	14	(United States) Ralph C. Harris	$2,500,000 - $3,000,000		Residential	Complete	
1959-9-1	Central Towers South		140 ft (38 m)	11	(United States) Robert Lee Hall	$1,500,000		Office	Complete	
1960-2	3033 North Central Avenue		110 ft (33 m)	9	(United States) Nicholas G. Sakellar			Office	Complete	Originally the Mayer Central Building
1960-3-4	Meridian Bank Tower		252 ft (76 m)	20	(United States) Charles G. Polacek		275,000	Office	Complete	Originally the Guaranty Bank Building, it only took 9 months to complete. The building underwent renovations in the early 1990s, repainted from light blue to tan and brown, and a pitched roof was added for aesthetics.
1960-3	1001 North Central Avenue		120 ft (36 m)	10	(United States) Fred M. Guirey & Associates	$2,400,000	110,000	Office	Complete	Originally the Coronet Apartment Hotel. The Kennedy-Johnson campaign set up Phoenix headquarters here in 1960, Senator John F. Kennedy visited the building for its opening on August 29, 1960. The building underwent renovations in the mid-1980s to turn it into an office building, the footprint was doubled and the building was modernized with glass cladding.
1960-10-19	Arizona Bank Building		120 ft (36 m)	10	(United States) Charles G. Polacek			Office	Demolished	In 2004, the building was in the process of being remodeled into residential condominiums called Monroe Place Lofts. High demand quickly sold out the 60-unit project. In May 2005 it was announced the existing building would be razed and in its place a 34-story tower would be erected and named 44 Monroe, the site's address. In late September 2005, demolition of the Arizona Bank Building began.
1961-7	Federal Building		110 ft (33 m)	8	(United States) Lescher & Mahoney (United States) Edward L. Varney	$5,000,000			Complete	
1961-7-4	Security Center			13	(United States) Weaver & Drover	$3,500,000		Office	Complete	Originally the United Title Building.
1962-6-4	3800 North Central Avenue		245 ft (74 m)	17	(United States) Flatow, Moore, Bryan and Fairburn	$5,000,000	190,456	Office	Complete	Originally known as the Del Webb Building. The building was remodeled in 1989, the exterior cladding was redone and it was given a pyramid crown.
1963-5-30	Calvin C. Goode Municipal Building		120 ft (36 m)	10	(United States) Ralph Haver (United States) Edward L. Varney	$4,500,000	174,000	Government	Complete	Originally the Phoenix Municipal Building or Phoenix City Hall.
1963-7-13 / 1963-9	Executive Towers Condominiums		235 ft (71 m)	22	(United States) Alan A. Dailey & Associates	$7,000,000		Residential	Complete	
1964	805 North 4th Avenue		125 ft (38 m)	11	(United States) Chopas & Starkovich	$2,000,000			Complete	Originally the Embassy Square Apartments.
1964-8-10	The Monroe		249 ft (75 m)	18	(United States) Weaver & Drover	$11,000,000	255,556	Office	Complete	On April 23, 1983, a four-alarm fire broke out on the 10th floor resulting in $9,000,000 of damage, 20 firefighters suffered from smoke inhalation. Originally the Arizona Title Building, later First American Title Building.
1964-10	Landmark On Central		176 ft (53 m)	17	(United States) Charles G. Polacek	$6,000,000		Residential	Complete	Originally the Camelback Towers.
1964-10-31	Memorial Towers (North)		110 ft (33 m)	10	(United States) Lescher & Mahoney	$1,000,000		Residential	Complete	Low-rent units for senior citizens on Phoenix Memorial Hospital grounds.
1964-10-31	Memorial Towers (South)		110 ft (33 m)	10	(United States) Lescher & Mahoney	$1,000,000		Residential	Complete	Low-rent units for senior citizens on Phoenix Memorial Hospital grounds.
1964-12	Maricopa County Administration Building		105 ft (32 m)	6	(United States) Stephen, Walsh, Emmons and Shanks			Government	Complete	
1965	Central Towers North		140 ft (38 m)	11	(United States) Robert Lee Hall	$3,000,000		Office	Complete	
1965-1-3	Phoenix Corporate Center		341 ft (104 m)	27	(United States) Irvin Finical & Associates	$21,000,000	445,811	Office	Complete	Originally the First Federal Building, it was the state's tallest building for six years until Wells Fargo Plaza claimed the title and brought the tallest back downtown. The exterior was remodeled in the mid-1990s.
1965-1-17	Superior Court Building		140 ft (42 m)	9	(United States) Stephen, Walsh, Emmons and Shanks			Government	Complete	
1965-2-27	4000 North Central Avenue		280 ft (85 m)	23	(United States) Flatow, Moore, Bryan and Fairburn	$10,000,000	297,615	Office	Complete	Originally the Del Webb TowneHouse.
1965-9	O'Malley Building			9	(United States) Weaver & Drover	$2,000,000		Office	Demolished	Demolished July 4, 1992 by means of controlled demolition.
1966-10-30	Regency House		235 ft (71 m)	21	(United States) George H. Schoneberger	$4,000,000		Residential	Complete	Originally to be named Royal Towers.
1969	St. Lukes Medical Center		110 ft (30 m)	9	(United States) Varney, Sexton, Sydnor Associates			Medical	Complete	
1970	Valleywise Health Medical Center		98 ft (29 m)	8	(United States) Lescher & Mahoney			Medical	Complete	Originally Maricopa County Medical Center
1970-5	Phoenix Financial Center		228 ft (69 m)	18	(Peru) Wenceslaus Sarmiento	$8,200,000	312,000	Office	Complete	Originally opened in September 1964 as a 10-story building. The architectural plans called for two 18-story buildings and two one story structures, in 1968 construction began on adding an additional 8-stories.
1971-2-28	3838 North Central Avenue		240 ft (73 m)	20	(United States) Flatow, Moore, Bryan and Fairburn	$10,000,000	235,477	Office	Complete	Originally called the Greyhound Tower.
1971-10-15	100 West Washington		372 ft (113 m)	27	(United States) Charles Luckman Associates	$25,000,000		Government	Complete	It opened as the First National Bank Plaza or First National Bank Building on October 15, 1971, it was briefly the states tallest building until Chase Tower was completed just a year and a half later. Later known as Wells Fargo Plaza.
1972-3-6	Fellowship Towers		212 ft (64 m)	17	(United States) Roger A. Reeves & Associates (United States) Norman E. Hodge	$3,700,000		Residential	Complete	
1971-6-12	Holiday Inn Phoenix Downtown North		120 ft (36 m)	10	(United States) Peter Lendrum Architecture (United States) Roland Terry & Associates			Hotel	Complete	Originally a Doubletree Inn hotel.
1971-5-21	Chase Tower		483 ft (147 m)	38	(United States) Welton Becket & Associates	$40,000,000	723,000	Vacant	Complete	Originally built for local financial heavyweight Valley National Bank, which Bank One merged with in 1994. Bank One merged with Chase in 2005 and the building was renamed. It has held the title of tallest building in Phoenix since its completion in 1971. Opened to the public on May 21, 1972. The building has been vacant since Chase moved out in 2021.
1972-11-26	Mountain Bell Building		136 ft (41 m)	10	(United States) Alfred N. Beadle	$4,500,000		Office	Demolished	The building was demolished on September 27, 2009. The firm that purchased the property in 2004 hoped to turn the building into a mid-rise retirement condominium but later stated the cost was too much for the building to be saved. The demolition was filmed for the pilot of The Imploders, a short-lived TV series on TLC network.
1973-5-25	Arizona State Capital Executive Tower		110 ft (33 m)	9	(United States) Varney, Sexton, Sydnor Associates (United States) Lescher & Mahoney (United States) Place & Place	$7,300,000		Government	Complete	
1974-7-15	One Lexington		200 ft (61 m)	15	(United States) Russell McCaleb	$6,000,000	190,000	Residential	Complete	Originally an office building for the Southern Arizona Bank and Trust Company called the Southern Arizona Bank Plaza, the facade was redone and the structure was converted into condominiums early 2010.
1975-3-5	Renaissance Phoenix Downtown		198 ft (60 m)	19	(United States) Schwenn & Clark, Inc.	$27,000,000 - $30,000,000		Hotel	Complete	Built on the site of the 12-story Adams Hotel which was built in 1911, it was demolished in two phases, on August 12, 1973, 350 pounds of explosives were used to demolish the two 5-story wings of the hotel, on September 2, 1973, the remaining 12-story structure was demolished.
1975-5-5	3030 North Central Avenue		188 ft (57 m)	14	(United States) McSweeney & Schuppel		174,003	Office	Complete	
1976-1-24	Hyatt Regency Phoenix		317 ft (97 m)	24	(United States) Charles Luckman Associates	$34,000,000		Hotel	Complete	
1976-9-20	US Bank Center		407 ft (124 m)	31	(United States) Thomas F. Marshall Associates	$20,000,000		Office	Complete	Originally served as headquarters for The Arizona Bank. Bank of America then occupied the tower until 2001 when the Bank of America Tower was completed at the Collier Center. In January 2005, this tower was renamed U.S. Bank Center and underwent a modest renovation to reflect the building's newest and largest tenant.
1977	Maricopa County Central Court Building		234 ft (71 m)	13	(United States) Varney, Sexton, Sydnor Associates			Government	Complete	
1980	3300 North Central Avenue		356 ft (109 m)	27	(United States) Skidmore, Owings and Merrill		364,000	Office	Complete	
1981	Great Western Bank Plaza		295 ft (90 m)	20	(United States) Peter Lendrum Architecture			Office	Complete	
1981	National Bank of Arizona Plaza		217 ft (66 m)	16	(United States) Rauenhorst Corporation			Office	Complete	
1982	Banner Good Samaritan Medical Center		217 ft (66 m)	12	(United States) Bertrand Goldberg & Associates	$90,000,000		Medical	Complete	
1982	Engle Homes Tower		289 ft (88 m)	20	(United States) Opus West		323,607	Office	Complete	Originally the Phelps Dodge Tower.
1984	One Camelback		165 ft (50 m)	11	(United States) Shepherd & Boyd			Office	Complete	
1984	Security Title Plaza		127 ft (38 m)	12	(United States) Dwayne Lewis Architects		217,247	Office	Complete	
1984	Central Park Square		151 ft (46 m)	12	(United States) CVML Architects		247,911	Office / Retail	Complete	
1985	One Thomas			13	(United States) Cornoyer-Hedrick Architects & Planners Inc.				Complete	
1985-12	Abacus Building		200 ft (61 m)	14	(United States) Allen + Philip	$43,000,000	252,400	Office	Complete	
1985	Great American Tower		320 ft (98 m)	24	(United States) Skidmore, Owings and Merrill		338,411	Office	Complete	
1985	2700 Tower		170 ft (51 m)	15	(United States) Opus West		213,338	Office	Complete	
1986	One Renaissance Square		347 ft (105 m)	25	(United States) Emery, Roth & Sons		492,116	Office	Complete	LEED Gold 2010
1986	Talley Plaza		162 ft (49 m)	11	(United States) Vernon Swaback Associates		226,000	Office	Complete	
1988	Ritz-Carlton Hotel		130 ft (39 m)	11	(United States) Cornoyer-Hedrick Architects & Planners Inc.			Hotel	Complete	
1988	Three Gateway Center		146 ft (44 m)	12	(United States) A. C. Martin Partners (United States) Sverdrup & Parcel			Office	Complete	
1988	Biltmore Financial Center II		150 ft (45 m)	11	(United States) CCM3 Architects	$60,000,000	299,499	Office	Complete	
1988	2800 Tower		258 ft (78 m)	21	(United States) Opus West		364,533	Office	Complete	LEED Certified
1988	Phoenix Plaza I		331 ft (101 m)	20	(United States) Langdon Wilson			Office	Complete	
1989	U-Haul Tower		397 ft (121 m)	25	(United States) Langdon Wilson		586,403	Office	Complete	The tallest building in Midtown and the 3rd tallest building in Phoenix overall. The tower's design in a basic square with vertical setbacks on all four sides giving each actual corner of the tower three 45-degree angled corners. Adding to the postmodern element is the addition of a single bay style window centered on each face of the tower and spanning floors 2 to 23. The crown is a hip roof, pyramid design and is colored turquoise.
1989	Crystal Point		224 ft (68 m)	20	(United States) Dwayne Lewis Architects			Residential	Complete	
1989	Camelback Esplanade I		136 ft (41 m)	11	(United States) Cornoyer-Hedrick Architects & Planners Inc.		234,743	Office	Complete	
1990	Camelback Esplanade II		136 ft (41 m)	11	(United States) Cornoyer-Hedrick Architects & Planners Inc.		234,844	Office	Complete	
1990	One Arizona Center		240 ft (73 m)	19	(United States) HKS, Inc.		326,000	Office	Complete	
1990	Two Arizona Center		260 ft (79 m)	20	(United States) HNTB Architecture		438,000	Office	Complete	
1990	Two Renaissance Square		372 ft (113 m)	27	(United States) Emery, Roth & Sons (United States) Pierce Goodwin Alexander & Linville		473,392	Office	Complete	LEED Gold 2010
1990	Phoenix Plaza II		331 ft (101 m)	20	(United States) Langdon Wilson			Office	Complete	
1990	Hilton Suites Phoenix		128 ft (39 m)	11				Hotel	Complete	
1990-12	Maricopa County Administration Building		123 ft (37 m)	10	(United States) Varney, Sexton, Lunsford, Aye Associates			Government	Complete	
1991	Viad Tower		374 ft (114 m)	24	(United States) HKS, Inc.	$83,000,000	482,256	Office	Complete	Originally called the Greyhound Dial Tower, later Dial Tower or Dial Corporate Center.
1994	Phoenix City Hall		368 ft (112 m)	20	(United States) Langdon Wilson	$83,000,000 - $120,000,000	550,000		Complete	
1997	Camelback Esplanade III		136 ft (41 m)	10	(United States) Cornoyer-Hedrick Architects & Planners Inc.		218,254	Office	Complete	LEED Gold
1997	Arizona Republic Building		124 ft (37 m)	10					Complete	
1999-10	Camelback Esplanade IV		136 ft (41 m)	10	(United States) Cornoyer-Hedrick Architects & Planners Inc.		206,222	Office	Complete	
1999-12-27	Phoenix Municipal Court		161 ft (49 m)	9	(United States) DMJM (United States) Helmuth, Obata and Kassabaum (United States) Omni Design Group	$44,880,000	330,000	Government	Complete	
2000-6	24th at Camelback I		100 ft (30 m)	8	(United States) Pickard Chilton		302,209	Office	Complete	
2000	Bank of America Tower		360 ft (110 m)	24	(United States) Opus Architects & Engineers		512,000	Office	Complete	Centerpiece of the Collier Center, a multi-use office and entertainment complex.
2001	One North Central		289 ft (88 m)	20	(United States) SmithGroup	$78,000,000	460,000	Office	Complete	Originally Phelps Dodge Centre
2002	Camelback Esplanade V		136 ft (41 m)	10	(United States) Cornoyer-Hedrick Architects & Planners Inc.		241,000	Office	Complete	
2003-1-13	Esplanade Place		135 ft (41 m)	13	(United States) DFD CornoyerHedrick	$30,000,000		Residential	Complete	
2006-9-28	Optima Biltmore Towers		143 ft (43 m)	15	(United States) David Hovey		469,000	Residential	Complete	
2006	The Residences at 2211 Camelback		144 ft (43 m)	12	(United States) DFD CornoyerHedrick	$44,000,000	376,022	Residential	Complete	
2007	The Summit at Copper Square		250 ft (76 m)	23	(United States) Hirsch Associates			Residential	Complete	
2008-9-30	Sheraton Phoenix Downtown		360 ft (110 m)	31	(United States) Architectonica	$350,000,000		Hotel	Complete	
2008	44 Monroe		380 ft (115 m)	34	(United States) Tucker Sadler Architects	$70,000,000	523,619	Residential	Complete	
2009-2	Taylor Place		161 ft (49 m)	13	(United States) SmithGroup	$71,007,264	352,000	Residential	Complete	
2009	Freeport-McMoRan Center		383 ft (116 m)	26	(United States) SmithGroup	$103,000,000	800,000	Office / Hotel	Complete	
2010	24th at Camelback II		136 ft (41 m)	11	(United States) Pickard Chilton		307,915	Office	Complete	
2010-11-5	Alliance Bank Tower		385 ft (117 m)	28	(United States) Callison Architecture		618,000	Office	Complete	
2012-2-14	Maricopa County Superior Court South Court Tower		284 ft (86 m)	16	(United States) Gould Evans	$340,000,000	695,273		Complete	
2014-4	Hotel Palomar			24	(United States) Callison Architecture			Retail / Residential / Hotel	Complete	
2017-3-2	Residence Inn by Marriott Phoenix Downtown		277 ft (75 m)	20	(United States) Awbrey, Cook, Rogers, McGill Architects			Hotel	Complete	
2018-11-6	Banner University Medical Center Tower		290 ft (89 m)	16	(United States) HKS Architects			Medical	Complete	
2019-5-20	The Stewart		242 ft (74 m)	19	(United States) CCBG Architects	$80,000,000		Residential	Complete	
2019	Altura PHX		350 ft (107 m)	30	(United States) Shepley Bulfinch			Residential	Complete	Formerly known as Link PHX
2020	The Ryan		210 ft (64 m)	17	(United States) Omniplan, Inc.			Residential	Complete	
2021	Kenect Phoenix		249 ft (75 m)	23	(United States) RSP Architects (United States) Perkins & Will			Residential	Complete	
2021	Adeline		291 ft (89 m)	25	(United States) SmithGroup			Residential	Complete	
2022	700 N 4th Street		304 ft (93 m)	27	(United States) Shepley Bulfinch			Residential	Complete	
2022	X Phoenix		269 ft (82 m)	20	(United States) Shepley Bulfinch (United States) FitzGerald Associates Architects			Residential	Complete	
2022	Derby Roosevelt Row		240 ft (73 m)	21	(United States) Wilder Belshaw Architects			Residential	Complete	
2022	Aspire Fillmore		208 ft (63 m)	17	(United States) CCBG Architects			Residential	Under Construction	
2023	Valleywise Heath Medical Center		200 ft (61 m)	10	(United States) EYP, Inc.			Medical	Under Construction	
2023	Skye on Sixth		287 ft (88 m)	26				Residential	Under Construction	
2023	Moontower PHX		255 ft (78 m)	24	(United States) Shepley Bulfinch			Residential	Under Construction	
2024	PalmTower Residences		316 ft (96 m)	28	(United States) The Lamar Johnson Colobrative (United States) Will Bruder			Residential	Under Construction	
2025 (expected)	Maeve Central Station		373 ft (114 m)	32				Residential	Under Construction	
2024	ANOVA Central Station		230 ft (70 m)	22				Residential	Under Construction	

=== Scottsdale ===
Was the state’s tallest building upon completion

Completed y/m/d	Name	Image	Height	Floors	Architect	Cost USD	Area sq ft	Usage	Status	Notes
1972	AmTrust Tower		143 ft (43 m)	11	(United States) Bell and Bell	$10,000,000	100,000	Office	Complete	Originally known as Camel View Plaza or Arizona Bank Building.
2002	The Westin Kierland Resort & Spa		120 ft (36 m)	9	(United States) Hill Glazier Architects	$89,000,000		Hotel	Complete	
2007-12	Plaza Lofts at Kierland Commons		120 ft (36 m)	9	(United States) Nelsen Architects		436,776	Residential / Retail	Complete	
2007-2-12	One Waterfront Place		160 ft (48 m)	13	(United States) Opus West (United States) Geoffrey H. Edmunds & Associates Inc			Residential	Complete	
2007-2-12	Two Waterfront Place		160 ft (48 m)	13	(United States) Opus West (United States) Geoffrey H. Edmunds & Associates Inc			Residential	Complete	
2010-4-15	Talking Stick Resort		180 ft (54 m)	15	(United States) FFKR Architects	$440,000,000	407,000	Resort	Complete	
2017-5	7160 Optmia Kierland		99 ft (30 m)	10	(United States) David Hovey			Residential	Complete	
2018-5	7120 Optmia Kierland		117 ft (35 m)	12	(United States) David Hovey			Residential	Complete	
2020	7140 Optmia Kierland		117 ft (35 m)	12	(United States) David Hovey			Residential	Complete	
2020-8	7180 Optmia Kierland		117 ft (35 m)	12	(United States) David Hovey			Residential	Complete	
2021	Hyatt House North Scottsdale		105 ft (32 m)	9	(United States) Allen + Philip			Hotel	Complete	

=== Tempe ===
Was the state’s tallest building upon completion

Completed y/m/d	Name	Image	Height	Floors	Architect	Cost USD	Area sq ft	Usage	Status	Notes
1963	Palo Verde East		97 ft (29 m)	8	(United States) Cartmell and Rossman	$1,500,000		Residential	Complete	
1964	Palo Verde West		97 ft (29 m)	8	(United States) Cartmell and Rossman	$1,500,000		Residential	Complete	
1967-9-10	Manzanita Hall		181 ft (85 m)	15	(United States) Cartmell and Rossman	$3,600,000	205,000	Residential	Complete	
1968-11-9	Wexler Hall		97 ft (29 m)	8	(United States) Michael & Kemper Goodwin	$1,714,238	94,000	Education	Complete	Originally known as the Mathematics Building
1991-9-30	Life Sciences Tower		161 ft (49 m)	9	(United States) Anderson DeBartolo Pan, Inc.			Education	Complete	
2000	US Airways Headquarters		130 ft (39 m)	9	(United States) Leo A. Daly (United States) SmithGroup		218,000	Office	Complete	LEED Gold
2002-7	Hayden Ferry Lakeside I		138 ft (42 m)	8	(United States) DFD CornoyerHedrick	$21,000,000	203,000	Office	Complete	
2006	Edgewater		100 ft (30 m)	8	(United States) Callison Architecture, Inc.	$67,000,000	128,000	Residential	Complete	
2007-2	Hayden Ferry Lakeside II		194 ft (59 m)	12	(United States) DFD CornoyerHedrick	$55,000,000	300,000	Office	Complete	
2007	Bridgeview		156 ft (47 m)	12	(United States) Callison Architecture, Inc.	$140,000,000	352,000	Residential	Complete	
2009-2	Tempe Gateway		132 ft (40 m)	8	(United States) Opus Architects & Engineers	$49,000,000	263,000	Office / Retail	Complete	
2009-8-18	922 Place		97 ft (30 m)	11	(United States) Hartshorne Plunkard Architecture	$30,000,000	275,000	Residential	Complete	Formerly called The Vue on Apache
2011	West Sixth I		258 ft (78 m)	22	(United States) Gould Evans			Residential	Complete	Centerpoint Residential
2011	West Sixth II		345 ft (105 m)	30	(United States) Gould Evans			Residential	Complete	Centerpoint Residential
2013-8	University House		193 ft (58 m)	19	(United States) Hartshorne Plunkard Architecture	$42,600,000	414,000	Residential	Complete	Also known as Hub on Campus.
2013-9-26	Residence Inn Tempe		145 ft (44 m)	11	(United States) LK Architecture	$50,000,000		Hotel	Complete	
2017-9	The Rise on Apache		170 ft (52 m)	15	(United States) Shepley Bulfinch		640,000	Mixed Use	Complete	
2018-8	Union Tempe		221 ft (67 m)	20 / 12	(United States) Opus Architects & Engineers, LLC	$160,000,000	850,000	Mixed Use	Complete	
2020-6	Tempe Hilton Canopy Hotel		159 ft (48 m)	14	(United States) Allen + Philip	$60,000,000	136,000	Hotel	Complete	
2020	Watermark Office Tower		318 ft (97 m)	15	(United States) Nelsen Partners	$150,000,000	265,000	Mixed Use	Complete	
2020-8	Oliv Tempe		259 ft (79 m)	24	(United States) Antunovich Associates		319,148	Mixed Use	Complete	The land purchased for the project—only 0.75 acres—sold for $8.4 million, and was the most expensive land purchase (per square foot) of any in Arizona over the last 10 years
2020	Mirabella at ASU		250 ft (76 m)	20	(United States) Ankrom Moisan Architects, Inc.	$167,000,000	620,000	Residential: Retirement	Complete	
2021-8	Westin Tempe		223 ft (68 m)	18	(United States) RSP Architects Ltd.	$86,000,000	276,558	Hotel	Complete	
2022	100 Mill		245 ft (75 m) (estimated)	15	(United States) Davis Architects	$190,000,000	280,000	Office/Hotel	Under Construction	Development of the site is conditioned upon renovation of the Valley's oldest continually occupied structure, the historic Hayden House.

=== Tucson ===
Was the state’s tallest building upon completion

Completed y/m/d	Name	Image	Height	Floors	Architect	Cost USD	Area sq ft	Usage	Status	Notes
1917	Santa Rita Hotel Addition		100 ft (30 m)	8	(United States) William and Alexander Curlett			Hotel	Demolished	Addition to the original 5 story structure built in 1903
1929-10-11	Chase Building		142 ft (43 m)	11	(United States) Walker & Eisen Architects	$1,000,000		Office	Complete	Originally the Consolidated National Bank building.
1930-1-4	Pioneer Hotel Building		151 ft (46 m)	11	(United States) Roy Place			Office	Complete	Originally a hotel. In the early morning hours of December 20, 1970 a fire broke out in the building resulting in the deaths of 29 people. Louis Cuen Taylor, a 16-year-old boy, was later charged with starting the fire. Taylor was sentenced to life in prison though he continues to maintain his innocence.
1962-2-12	Transamerica Building		155 ft (47 m)	11	(United States) Thomas E. Stanley		180,000	Office	Complete	Originally the Phoenix Title Building, named after its largest tenant. Later called the Transamerica Title Building.
1963-11-1	Tucson House		195 ft (59 m)	18	(United States) Lowenberg & Lowenberg (United States) Nicholas G. Sakellar			Residential	Complete	
1966-3-27	Pima County Legal Services Building		260 ft (79 m)	20	(United States) Place & Place	$4,500,000	220,000	Office	Complete	Originally the Tucson Federal Savings & Loan Association Building or Tucson Federal Building. Later known as the Home Federal Building.
1967-10-23	City Hall Tower		120 ft (36 m)	10	(United States) Friedman and Jobusch	$1,800,000 - 1,900,000		City Hall	Complete	
1968-10-30	Pima County Health & Welfare Building			6	(United States) Terry Atkinson (United States) Gordon Luepke	$2,000,000	96,000	Government	Complete	
1969-9	Pima County Administration Building			11	(United States) Terry Atkinson (United States) Gordon Luepke	$3,961,850		Government	Complete	A fire broke out on the 4th floor on the night of June 25, 1973, there was only minor damage to the building estimated to be $40,000, there was additional damages of $500,000 to equipment. Investigators later determined that a 17-year-old boy employed at the building intentionally lit the fire. The building did not have sprinklers at the time of the fire.
1973-11-29	The Hotel Arizona		150 ft (45 m)	12	(United States) Everett I. Brown	$9,000,000		Hotel	Complete	Originally the Braniff Place Tucson or Braniff International Hotel.
1974-5-10	Federal Building		113 ft (34 m)	8	(United States) Cain, Nelson, Wares, Cook & Associates	$5,500,000		Government	Complete	
1975	Pima County Superior Court Building			9	(United States) Terry Atkinson (United States) Gordon Luepke	$7,500,000		Government	Complete	High winds caused the top of the buildings framework to bend 5 feet during construction.
1975-5	5151 East Broadway		226 ft (68 m)	16	(United States) Mascarella Merry & Associates	$7,500,000	210,000	Office	Complete	Originally the Great Western Bank-Pima Savings Building or just Great Western Bank Building.
1977	Bank of America Plaza		264 ft (80 m)	16	(United States) Allan Elias	$10,000,000	160,000	Office	Complete	Originally the Arizona Bank Plaza.
1985	Gould-Simpson Building		141 ft (42 m)	10	(United States) Metz, Train & Youngren	$18,500,000		Office	Complete	
1986	One South Church		330 ft (100 m)	23	(United States) Fentress Bradburn Associates		240,811	Office	Complete	Formerly UniSource Energy Tower and Norwest Bank Tower.
2011-11	UniSource Energy Building			9			170,000	Office	Complete	
2011-11-11	Casino Del Sol Resort, Spa and Conference Center			10		$131,000,000	161,000	Casino / Hotel	Complete	
2013	Luna		170 ft (51 m)	14	(United States) Shepley Bulfinch	$25,000,000		Residential	Complete	
2013-10-19	Hub at Tucson		160 ft (48 m)	13	(United States) Antunovich Associates			Residential	Complete	
8-2014	Sol		160 ft (48 m)	13	(United States) Shepley Bulfinch			Residential	Complete	

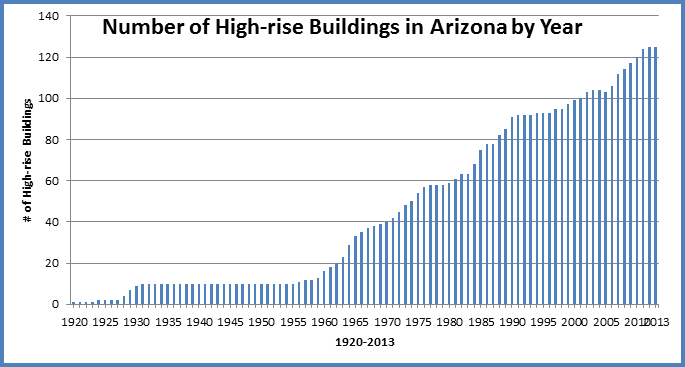

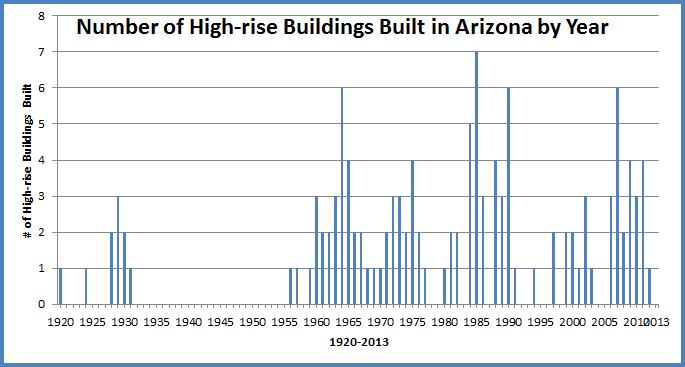

== Number of buildings ==
City	Completed	Under-Construction	On-Hold	Demolished
Casa Grande	1	0	0	0
Chandler	2	0	0	1
Flagstaff	1	0	0	0
Mesa	4	0	0	0
Phoenix	107	7	0	3
Scottsdale	11	0	0	0
Tempe	22	1	0	0
Tucson	20	3	0	1
State Total	168	11	0	5

== Average floor count ==
City	Average floor count
Casa Grande	9
Chandler	10
Flagstaff	9
Mesa	12.25
Phoenix	16.39
Scottsdale	11.66
Tempe	13.77
Tucson	12.41
State Total	15.25

== See also ==
- List of tallest buildings in Phoenix
- List of tallest buildings in Tucson
