= List of tallest buildings in Tucson =

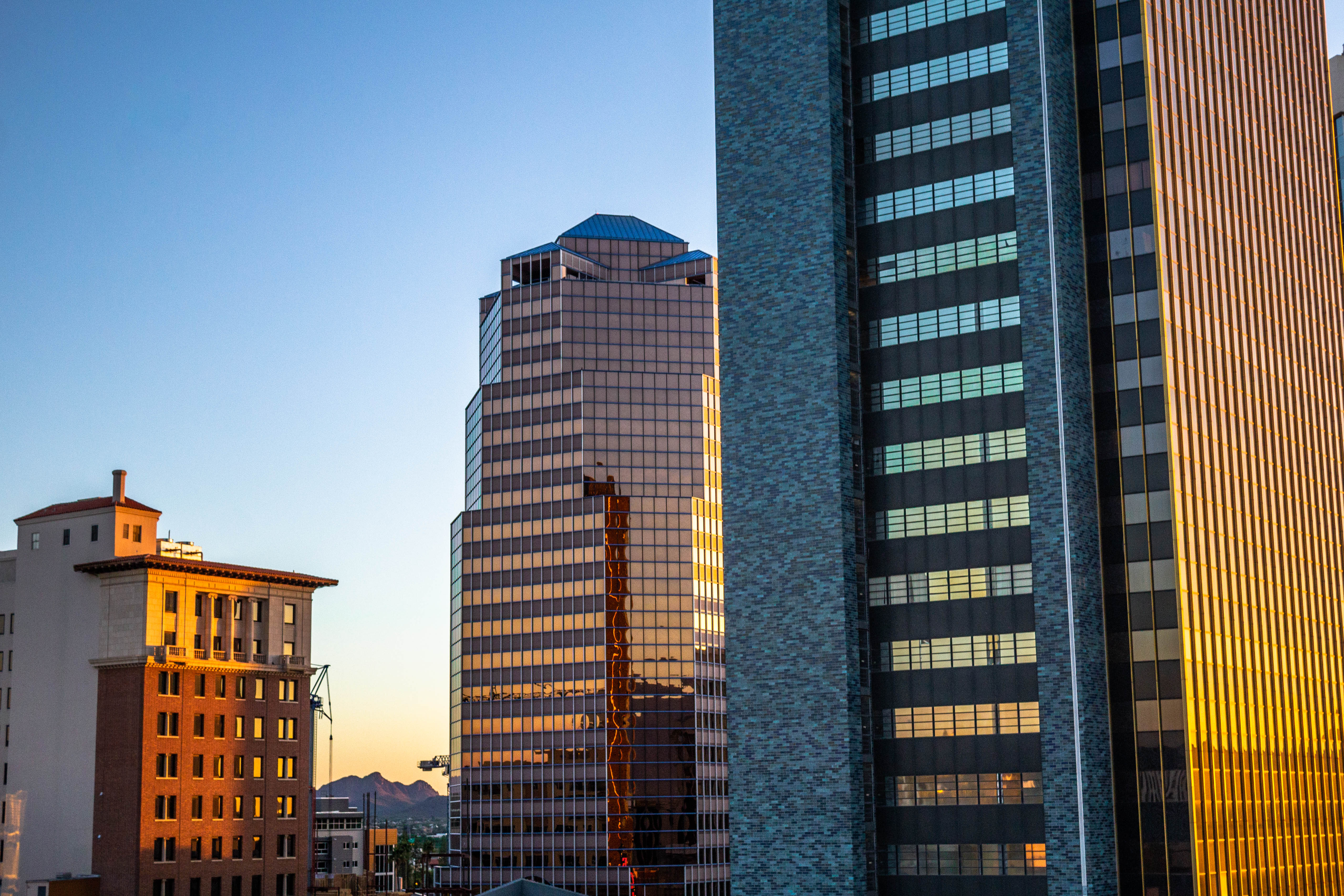
One South Church, Pima County Legal Services Building, and the Chase Building in May of 2019

This list of tallest buildings in Tucson ranks high-rise buildings in Tucson, Arizona, United States, at least 100 feet (30 m) tall, based on standard height measurement. This measurement includes architectural details (such as spires), but not radio masts and towers. As of 2026, the tallest building in Tucson is One South Church (1986) at 330 feet (100 m).

== List ==
Rank	Name	Image	Height ft (m)	Floors	Year	Notes
1	One South Church		330 (100)	23	1986	Formerly the Norwest Bank Tower until 2001, the name was changed to UniSource Energy Tower until 2012 when UniSource Energy moved to the new UniSource Energy Building. Tallest building in Arizona outside of the Phoenix metropolitan area.
2	Bank of America Plaza		264 (80)	16	1977	Originally the Arizona Bank Plaza, the tallest building in Tucson from 1977-1986. The tower has an antenna that reaches up to 360 feet tall.
3	Pima County Legal Services Building		260 (79)	20	1967	Originally the Tucson Federal Savings & Loan Association Building or Tucson Federal Building. Tallest building in Tucson from 1967-1977. Otherwise known as Home Federal Tower or Great American Tower.
4	5151 East Broadway		225 (68)	16	1975	Originally the Great Western Bank-Pima Savings Building or Great Western Bank Building.
5	Banner University Medical Center Tucson		196 (59)	9	2019	An expansion to Banner Hospital's current property.
6	Tucson House		195 (59)	17	1963	Originally designed by Chicago developers to be a luxury high-rise apartment building with hotel-like amenities. Tallest building in Tucson from 1963-1967, and still the tallest residential building in the city. Currently owned by the City of Tucson and utilized as public housing for the elderly and disabled.
7	The Pacific		170 (51.6)	14	2013	Construction has been completed. The building is now the tallest all-student residential building in the city.
8	Casino Del Sol Hotel Tower		166 (50)	10	2011	A 26 ft tall L.E.D. dome sits atop the building.
9	olīv		160 (48.7)	14	2020	A 160 foot tall tower completed in August 2020. Private dormitories for University of Arizona students.
10	Malibu		160 (48.7)	13	2014	A 160 foot tall tower completed in 2014. Sister building to The Pacific. Private dormitories for University of Arizona students.
11	Hub at Tucson		158 (48.7)	13	2014	A 160 foot tall residential tower. It is 13 stories tall. Private dormitories for University of Arizona students.
12	Pima County Administrative Building		155 (47)	11	1969	
13	Transamerica Building		153 (47)	11	1962	Originally the Phoenix Title Building, named after its largest tenant.
14	Aspire Tucson		151 (46)	12	2019	Student housing in the main gate area
15	The Pioneer (formerly the Pioneer Hotel)		151 (46)	11	1930	Originally a hotel, in the early morning hours of December 20, 1970 a fire broke out in the building resulting in the deaths of 29 people. In 1977 extensive remodeling occurred (including adding fake windows and a metal facade) and is now operated as an office building.
16	Ari on Fourth		150 (45.7)	13	2024	323-unit multifamily development on 4th Ave with 4,971 square feet of retail space
17	The Hotel Arizona		150 (45)	12	1973	Originally the Braniff Place Tucson or Braniff International Hotel. Currently closed and under construction to become a Hyatt Regency hotel.
18	UA Health Science Innovation Building		148 (45.1)	9	2019	A new building for the school's nursing, medical, and pharmacy colleges. Lobby space will be used to host school events. Swaim architects.
19	Pima County Consolidated Justice Court		143 (42.6)	8	2013	A court complex to be operated by Pima County.
20	The Treasury 1929 Building		142 (43)	11	1929	Originally the Consolidated National Bank, then the Valley National Bank, then Chase Bank until 2023. The 1929 building is known as Tucson's first skyscraper and is listed on the National Register of Historic Places as the Valley National Bank Building.
21	Pima County Superior Court Building		137 (42)	9	1974	
22	UniSource Energy Building		135 (42)	9	2011	Building will become the new home for Tucson Electric Power and UniSource Energy, it is the first highrise/skyscraper built in Tucson since the mid-1980s.
23	Evo A. DeConcini United States Courthouse		134 (41)	6	2000	
24	Gould-Simpson Building		131 (40)	10	1985	Houses technical labs and classrooms on the University of Arizona campus.
25	Merrill Lynch Building		130 (40)	9	1963	
26	City Hall Tower		120 (36)	10	1967	
27	Federal Building		113 (34)	8	1974	
28	St. Marys Hospital		102 (31)	8	1950	

== Approved, proposed, under construction, or cancelled ==
Under construction

Rank in City After Completion	Name	Image	Height ft (m)	Floors	Year	Notes
--	UofA Freshman Residence Hall		--	9	2027	A proposed freshman dorm with 1200-1300 beds on the NW corner of Speedway and Campbell Ave.
