= The Book House =

Bookstore in Dinkytown

The Book House is a bookstore located in Dinkytown, near the University of Minnesota Twin Cities campus. Founded in 1976 by two couples, it sells used books both in-store and online and also has a rare book section. After the closure of Biermaier's Books in 2011, the Book House has since remained the only independent, non-university bookstore in Dinkytown, as well as one of the oldest bookstores in Minneapolis–Saint Paul.

== History ==
=== The Old Book House ===
The bookstore was founded in 1976 by James and Kristen Cummings and Dr. Rob and Lynn Wozniak, two bookseller couples who had previously sold academic books to libraries. Together, the four of them pooled their respective collections, totaling tens of thousands of books, and set up the Book House in Dinkytown. A decade later, the Book House stocked over a hundred thousand books.

In 1994, the Book House was one of the first bookstores in the United States to take advantage of the internet to promote its collection.

=== The New Book House ===
In 2013, the bookstore moved out of its old location. It reopened the following year in a new location, about a third of the original location's size, in the same neighborhood, moving into the storefront where Dinkytown Antiquarian Books used to be. The bookstore, along with other local businesses, had moved due to plans by the Opus Group to build an apartment complex in Dinkytown.

In 2024, the bookstore stocked Minnesota Manga, a local soft-cover booklet magazine of local manga established by students at the University of Minnesota, the University of Northwestern–St. Paul, and other colleges and universities in Minneapolis–Saint Paul.

As of 2024, the store is co-owned by Kristen, now Kristen Eide-Tollefson, and Matt Hawbaker. It has since become a neighborhood staple in Dinkytown. Minnesota Daily included it in their list of the five best independent book stores near the university campus. The bookstore also houses the personal collection of Minnesota Supreme Court Justice Rosalie Wahl, which includes selections of Virginia Woolf, Willa Cather, Meridel Le Sueur, and other Minnesotan women poets.
