= The Aquitania =

Apartment building in Chicago, Illinois

- U.S. National Register of Historic Places
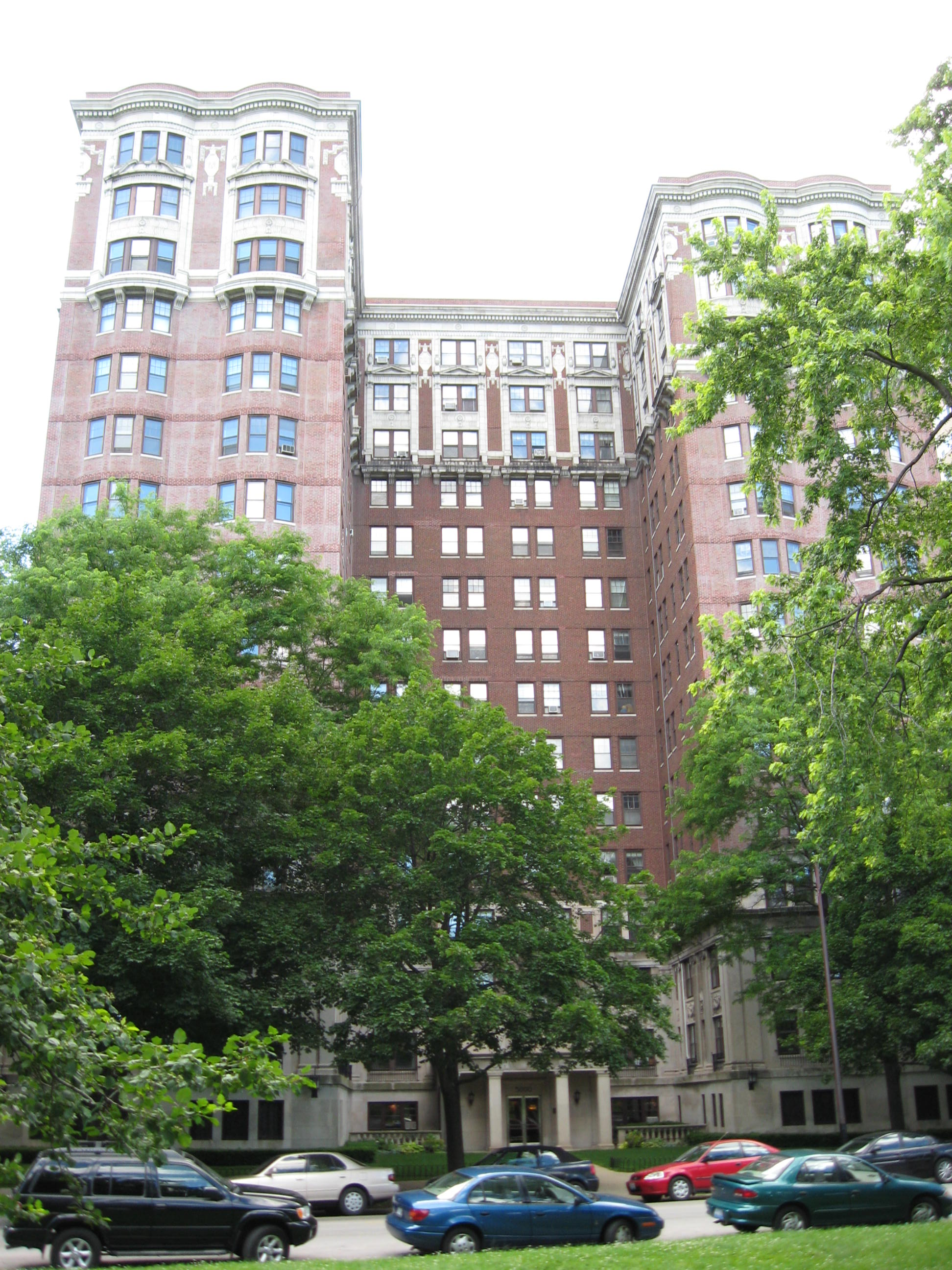
- The Aquitania

- Location within Chicago metropolitan area Location within Illinois Location within the United States
- Location: 5000 N. Marine Drive; Chicago, Illinois 60640
- Coordinates: 41°58′24.74″N 87°39′4.98″W
- Built: 1923; 103 years ago
- Architect: Harris, Ralph C.; Jillson, Byron H.
- Architectural style: Classical Revival, Moderne
- NRHP reference No.: 02000099
- Added to NRHP: March 1, 2002

The Aquitania is a luxury, 82-unit cooperative apartment building in the Margate Park neighborhood of the Uptown community of Chicago, Illinois. It is officially designated on the National Register of Historic Places by The United States Department of the Interior. The name was likely a nod to the Cunard transatlantic express ocean liner, RMS Aquitania, which entered service in 1914 and was one of the most popular ships on the North Atlantic in the 1920s, sailing until 1949.

The Aquitania, known legally as the 5000 North Marine Drive Corporation, was built by Ralph C. Harris and Byron H. Jillson in the Classical Revival style. Its developer was George K. Spoor, the co-founder of Essanay Studios and a producer of silent movies during the first two decades of the 20th century. At that time, Chicago rivaled both New York City and Hollywood in film production, and Spoor was able to use his considerable wealth to plan and develop a property, which he felt was befitting the celebrities connected with Chicago's growing entertainment industry. A legend, which purports that Essanay Studio actors Charlie Chaplin and Gloria Swanson once resided at The Aquitania, is likely unfounded. This probable factual inaccuracy reflects nothing more than film lore since all silent film production left Chicago's Essanay studios for southern California by 1918 at the very latest, and The Aquitania was not built until 1923, although there are historical accounts of both silent-film era stars staying as guests at The Aquitania when it was a hotel in its earliest days.

When the Aquitania was built, it was situated directly on the Lake Michigan shore; subsequent development of both Lake Shore Drive and the lakefront park have moved the shore some two blocks east of the building. The fifteen-story building has a courtyard and an Art Moderne lobby. Construction was completed in 1923, and it became a cooperative in 1949.

== See also ==
- National Register of Historic Places listings in Chicago
