= Tokyo Hotel =

Hotel in Chicago, Illinois

Coordinates: 41°53′32.1″N 87°37′38.3″W

The Tokyo Hotel, located at 19 E. Ohio Street, was a hotel in the Near North Side of Chicago. Designed by architect Ralph C. Harris, it is 15 stories tall, and has 150 rooms. It opened in 1927 as the Devonshire Hotel.

Before it closed in 2013, the Tokyo was not aimed at tourists, but rather longer-term residents, and earned a reputation for being home to "prostitution and criminal activity."

In October 2013 the hotel was sold for $13.5 Million to a real estate development firm. Following extensive renovation, the building reopened in June 2015 as the Freehand Chicago Hostel.

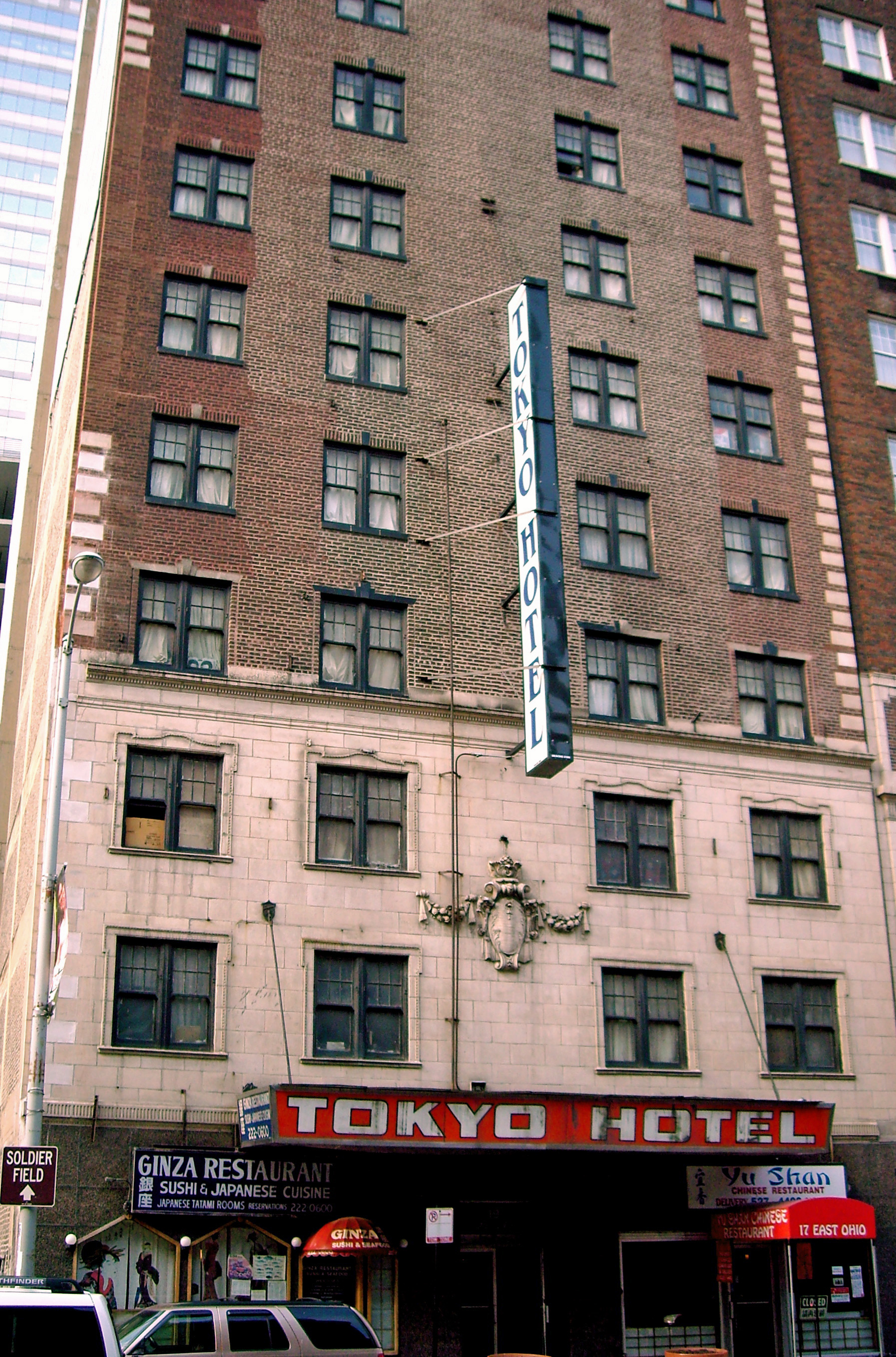
Tokyo Hotel, Chicago, Illinois

== See also ==
- Chicago architecture
