= Pima County Legal Services Building =

Coordinates: 32.22255°N 110.971049°W

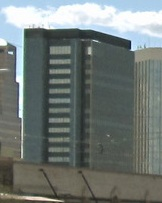
- Interactive map of the Pima County Legal Services Building area

General information
- Location: Tucson, Arizona, 32 North Stone Avenue
- Construction started: 1964
- Completed: 1966
- Cost: $4.5 Million
- Owner: Pima County

Height
- Height: 260 ft (79 m)

Design and construction
- Architect: Place & Place
- Main contractor: M. M. Sundt Construction Company

The Pima County Legal Services Building is a 20-storey government office building located in downtown Tucson, Arizona. It is the third tallest building in Tucson.

== History ==
The building completed in 1967 originally was home to the Tucson Federal Savings & Loan Bank and known as the Tucson Federal Building. The building was designed by local architects Place & Place and featured a large banking hall on the second floor as well as windows on three sides of the building with a gold sunscreen to protect the west facing windows. The exterior featured a unique blue glazed brick. The M. M. Sundt Construction Company won the $4.5 million contract (equivalent to $47 million in 2025) for construction of the building, and construction started in the summer of 1964. When the tower was completed in 1966, it was the tallest building in Tucson. A formal dedication ceremony was held on March 27, 1966.

From 1967 to 1990, the exclusive Old Pueblo Club occupied the top two floors. The top of the building was built with a time and temperature clock, which was decommissioned in 1987, although the clock was still in use in 1990. In the early 1970s, the building became known as the Home Federal Building, and on June 23, 1986 it was renamed the Great American Tower Building. It would remain Tucson's tallest building until 1977 when the Arizona Bank Plaza was built. In 1987, the building was purchased for $10.5 million (equivalent to $30 million in 2025) by Pima County, and renamed the Pima County Legal Services Building. In 1997, a water line in a rooftop room broke, sending water through ceiling tiles down to the 16th floor. In 2019, the condition of the blue glazed bricks on the exterior had deteriorated, and several bricks had fallen down to the street below. Nobody was injured by falling bricks, and the county installed protective scaffolding while the brick was repaired.

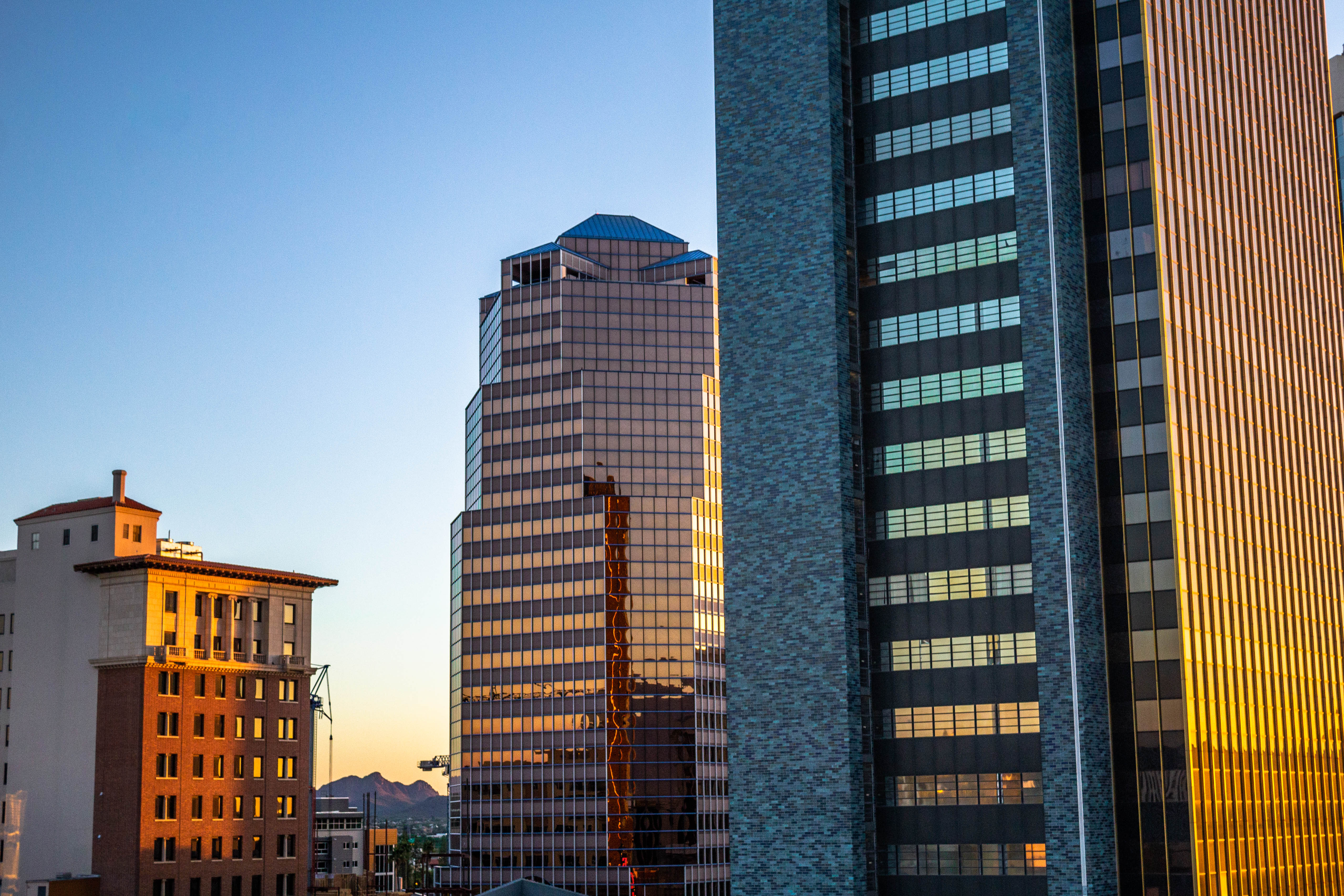
The Pima County Legal Services Building (right) with One South Church (center) and the Chase Building (left)

== See also ==
- List of tallest buildings in Tucson
- List of tallest buildings in Arizona
