= Kierland Commons =

Shopping mall in Phoenix, Arizona, US

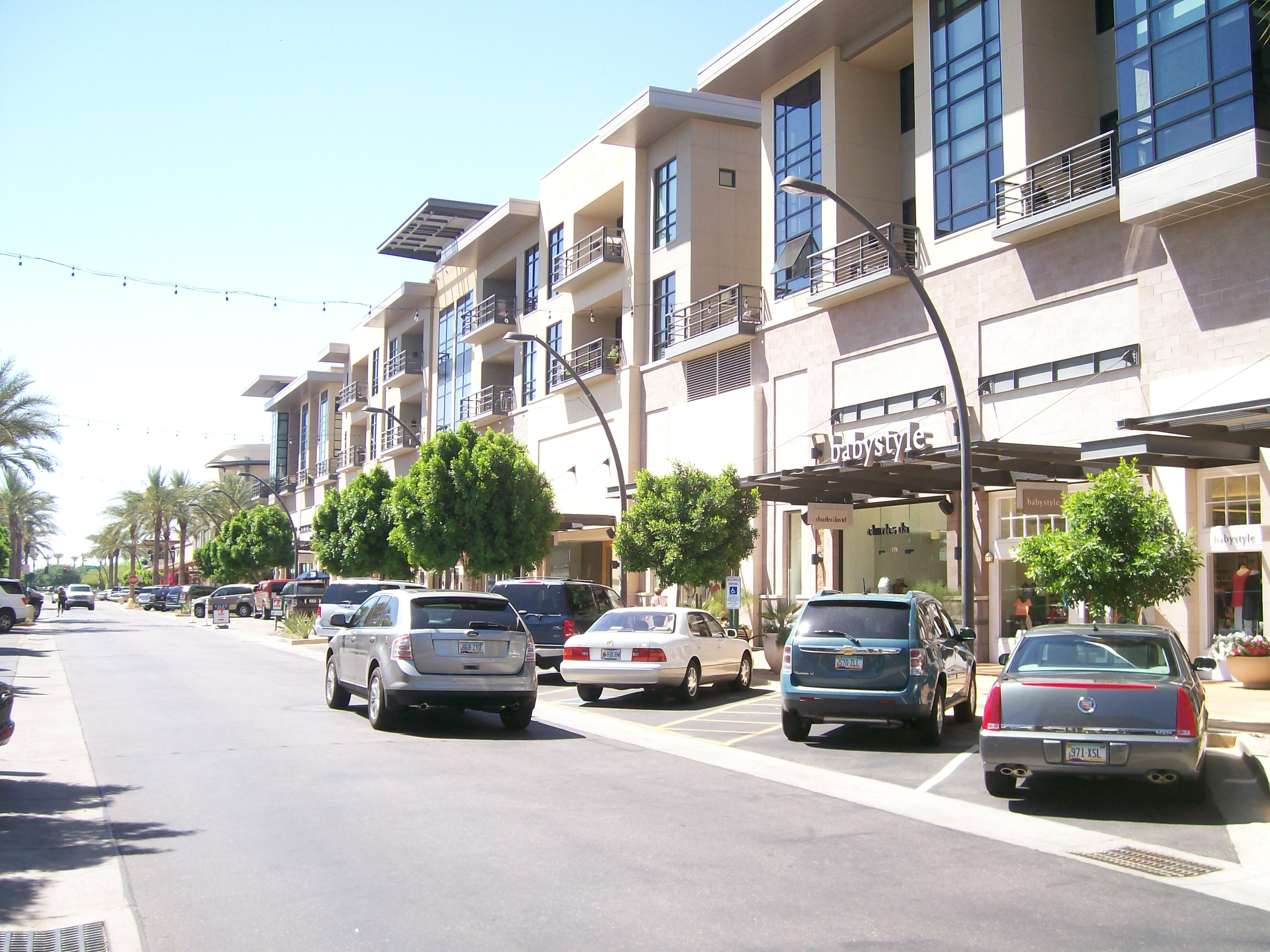
- Main Street in Kierland Commons (looking west)
- Location: Phoenix, Arizona, United States
- Coordinates: 33°37′26″N 111°55′43″W
- Address: 15205 N Kierland Blvd
- Opened: First stores opened in 2000, all retail open by 2005
- Developer: Woodbine Development Corporation
- Manager: Macerich
- Owner: Macerich
- Architect: Nelsen Architects
- Num. of stores: 75
- Num. of anchor tenants: 5
- Floor area: 436,776 square feet (40,577.8 m^{2})
- Floors: Ground Floor Retail, Limited residential above
- Parking: Outdoor and garage
- Website: kierlandcommons.com

Kierland Commons is a lifestyle center in Phoenix, Arizona, adjacent to Scottsdale, Arizona which is used for the center's mailing addresses. The mixed-use development is centered on a "Main Street" feel and composed mostly of outdoor retail shops with residential units above and adjoining residential tower.

== Development ==
The mixed-use destination began construction in 1995 and was completed in 2000. The primary developer was Woodbine Development Corporation of Dallas. The development concept, urban design plan and design guidelines were prepared by Design Workshop, Inc. (Denver, CO) and Communication Arts, Inc. (Boulder, CO). Building design was developed and prepared by Nelsen Architects (now known as Nelsen Partners). Originally owned by Westcor, in 2002 Kierland Commons became part of The Macerich Company's portfolio. Signature Properties was the Exclusive Residential Broker for The Plaza Lofts at Kierland Commons from 2003 through 2013 and remains On-Site to handle resales.

Kierland Commons was one of 10 developments honored as award winners by the Urban Land Institute's (ULI) 2009 Awards for Excellence; the 2009 winners were selected from a pool of 140 projects located across the Americas. The awards are widely considered the land-use industry's most prestigious recognition program. Other awards Kierland Commons has received include the 2010 "Crescordia" Award for Environmental Excellence by the Phoenix Valley Forward Association and the 2004 Honor Award given by the Arizona Chapter of the American Society of Landscape Architects (ASLA).

Kierland Commons was the first lifestyle center in Arizona. The 600,000-square-foot (56,000 m^{2}) Main-Street-style development includes shopping, dining, entertainment, office space and upscale loft condominiums, The Plaza Lofts. Kierland Commons was created to serve as the community gathering place for the 730-acre (3.0 km^{2}) master-planned community of Kierland, whose notable features include The Westin Kierland Resort & Spa, the 27-hole Kierland Golf Club, as well as other residential and commercial entities.

Kierland Commons is home to about 75 stores, restaurants and services on approximately 38 acres (150,000 m^{2}) and cost approximately US$65 million to build. Like many shopping centers in the Phoenix area, it is managed by the Westcor division of Macerich, though majority ownership is held by the developer, Woodbine Development Corporation.

Some notable retailers at Kierland Commons include Anthropologie, Banana Republic, BCBG Max Azria, Coach, Crate & Barrel, ECCO, Eileen Fisher, J.Crew, Lucky Brand Jeans, Michael Kors, 7 for all mankind and Tommy Bahama. On December 31, 2014, Barnes and Noble closed.

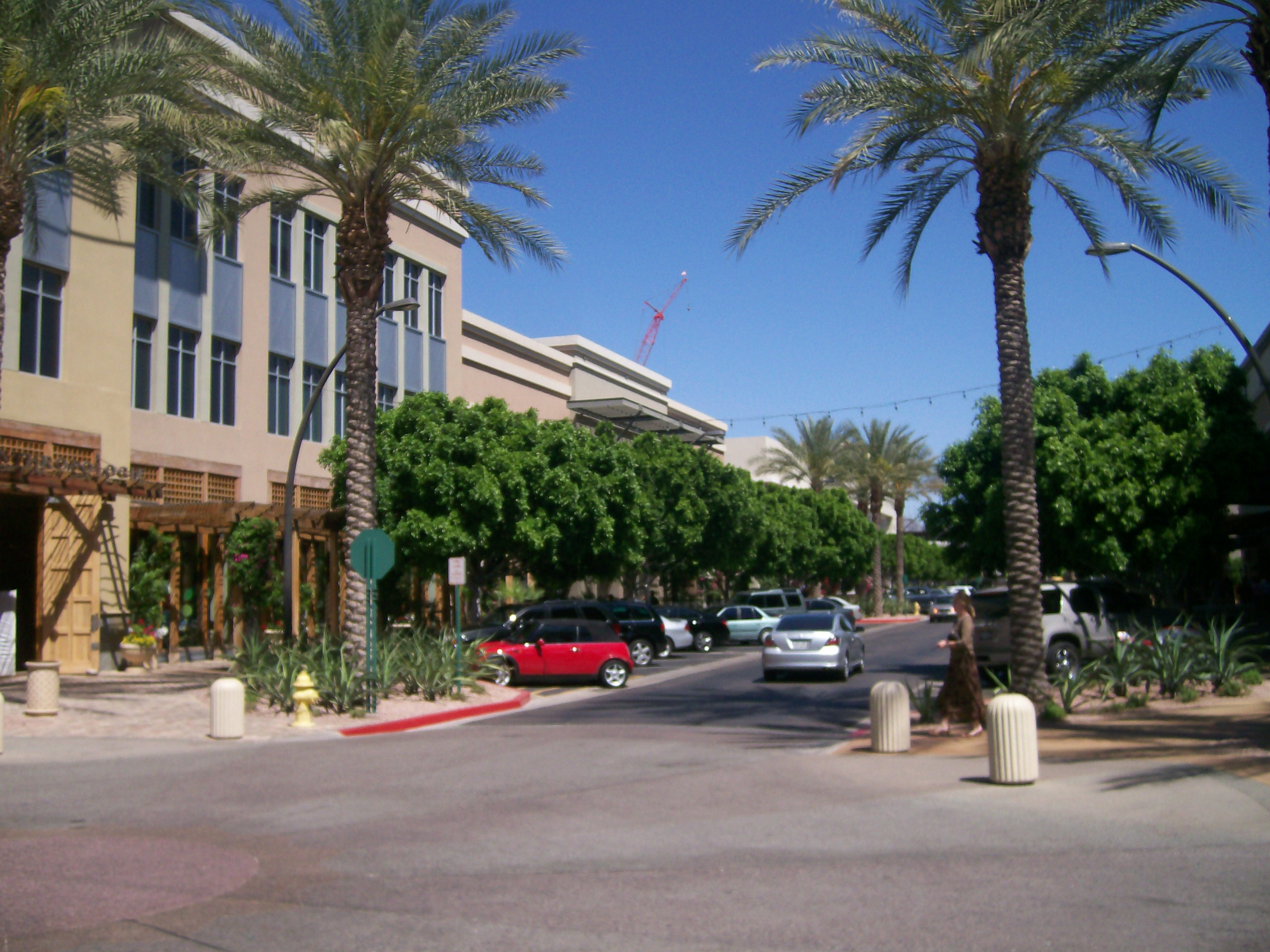
Main Street (looking east)

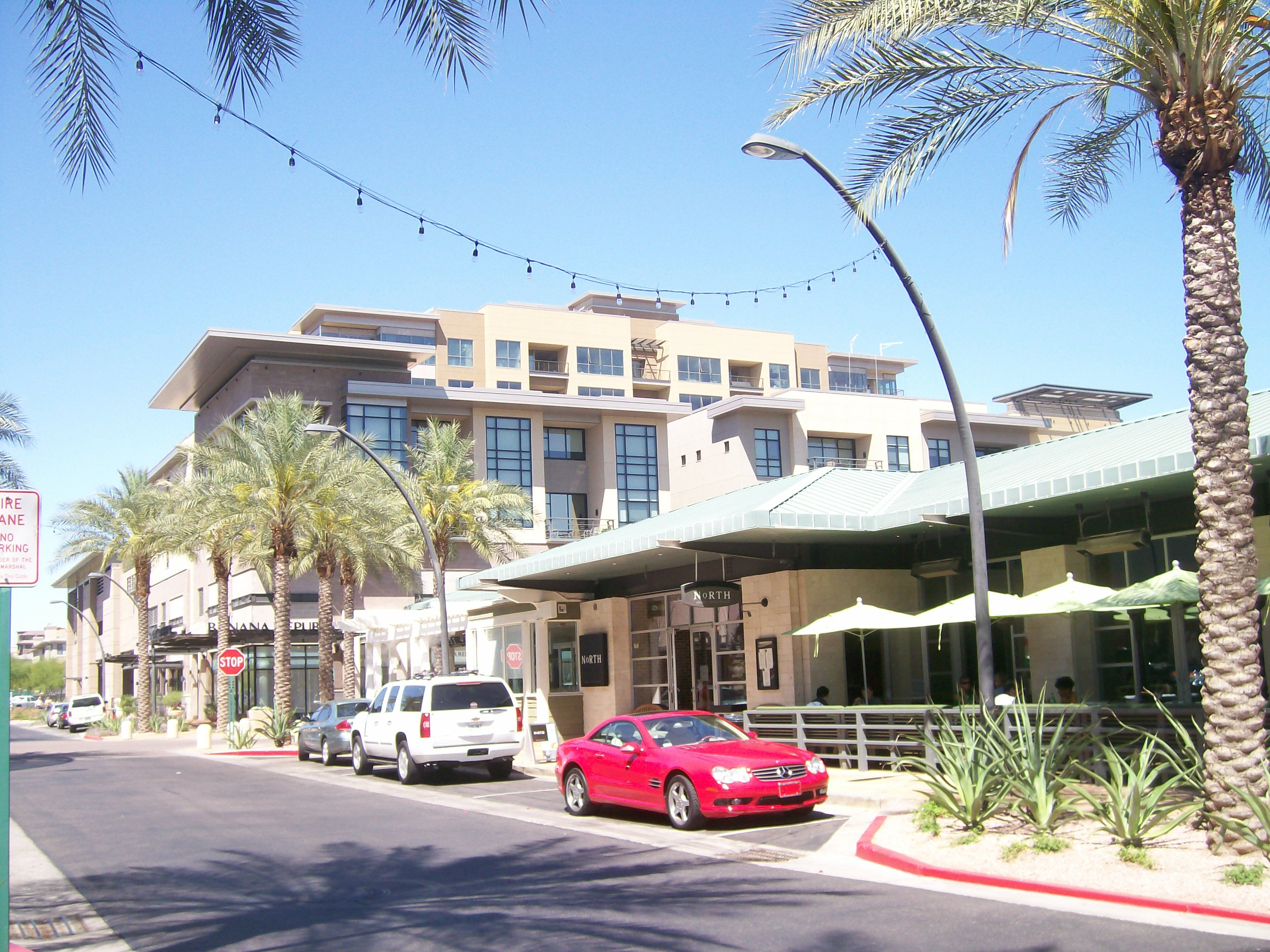
Kierland Commons (looking north)

== The Plaza Lofts ==
The mixed-use development's residential component is composed of The Plaza Lofts at Kierland Commons, located above retail overlooking the central plaza on Main Street and in an adjacent nine-story tower. The Plaza Lofts holds the record for the highest price per square foot of any residential project in Arizona – at $1,051 per square foot on a sale made in February 2007. Signature Properties was the Exclusive Residential Broker for The Plaza Lofts at Kierland Commons from 2003 through 2013 and remains On-Site to handle resales.

The Scottsdale condominium community features 84 residences in two phases. Phase I was completed spring 2005, with all 30 lofts selling out in 30 days with only on-site signage and word-of-mouth. Floor plans include one-bedroom and two-bedroom/study floor plans measuring 1,100 to 2,800 square feet (260 m^{2}).

Phase II of The Plaza Lofts was completed summer 2008. The nine-story tower contains 54 residences and offers one-bedroom to two-bedroom/study floor plans stretching 1,100 to 2,800 square feet (260 m^{2}). Five penthouse suites occupy the top floor, measuring 3,300 to 3,900 square feet (360 m^{2}) with sweeping mountain, desert and city views.

Community amenities of The Plaza Lofts include a private residential parking garage; two reception lobbies with card-access entry (one per phase); a professional-grade fitness facility; two community rooms, one with a full kitchen and another with a catering-friendly setup; a heated lap pool and whirlpool; as well as a bi-level outdoor amenity deck featuring fire pits, gas barbecues and comfortable seating areas and a water feature.

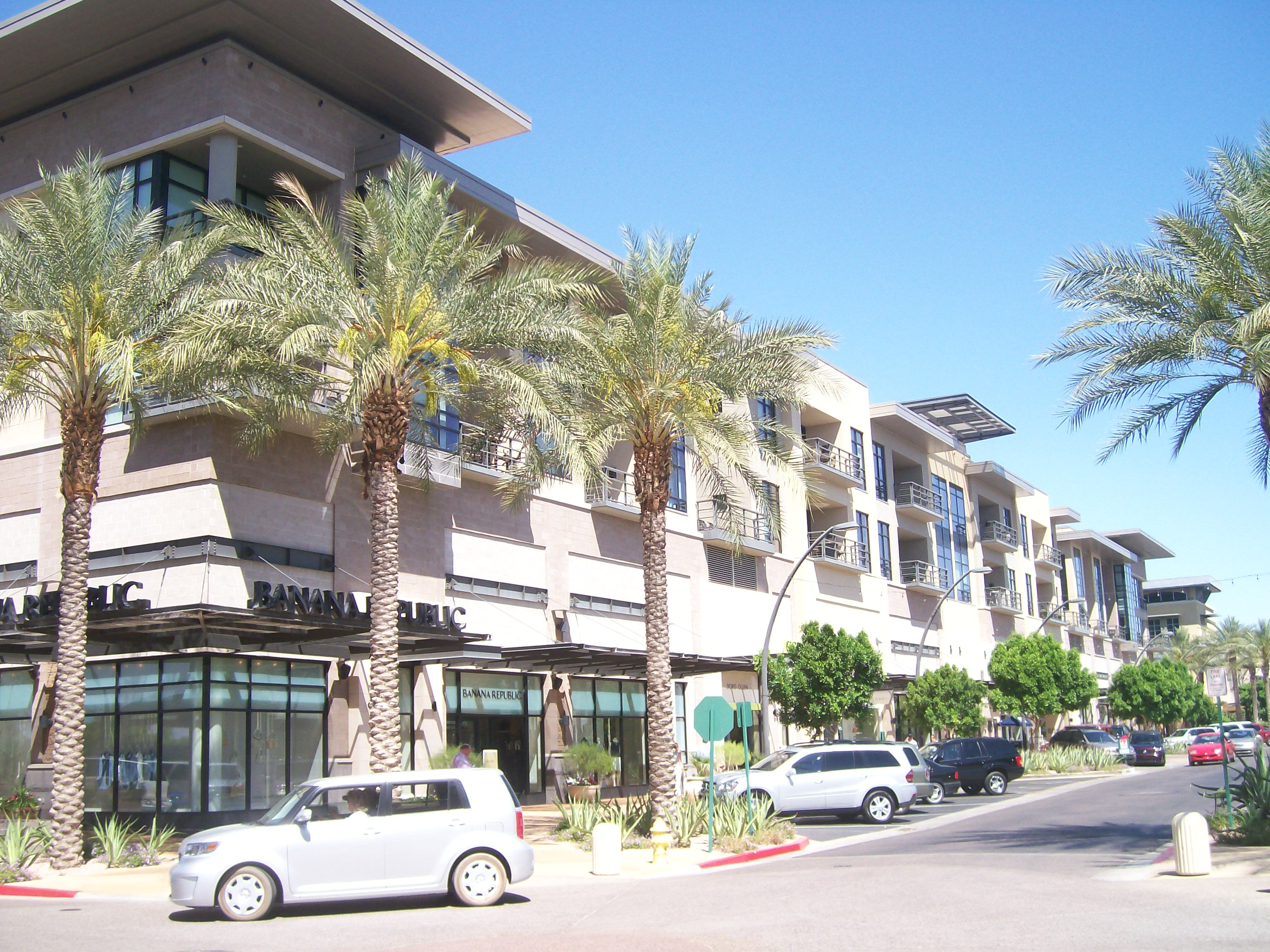
Main Street at the Plaza Lofts Phase I (looking east)

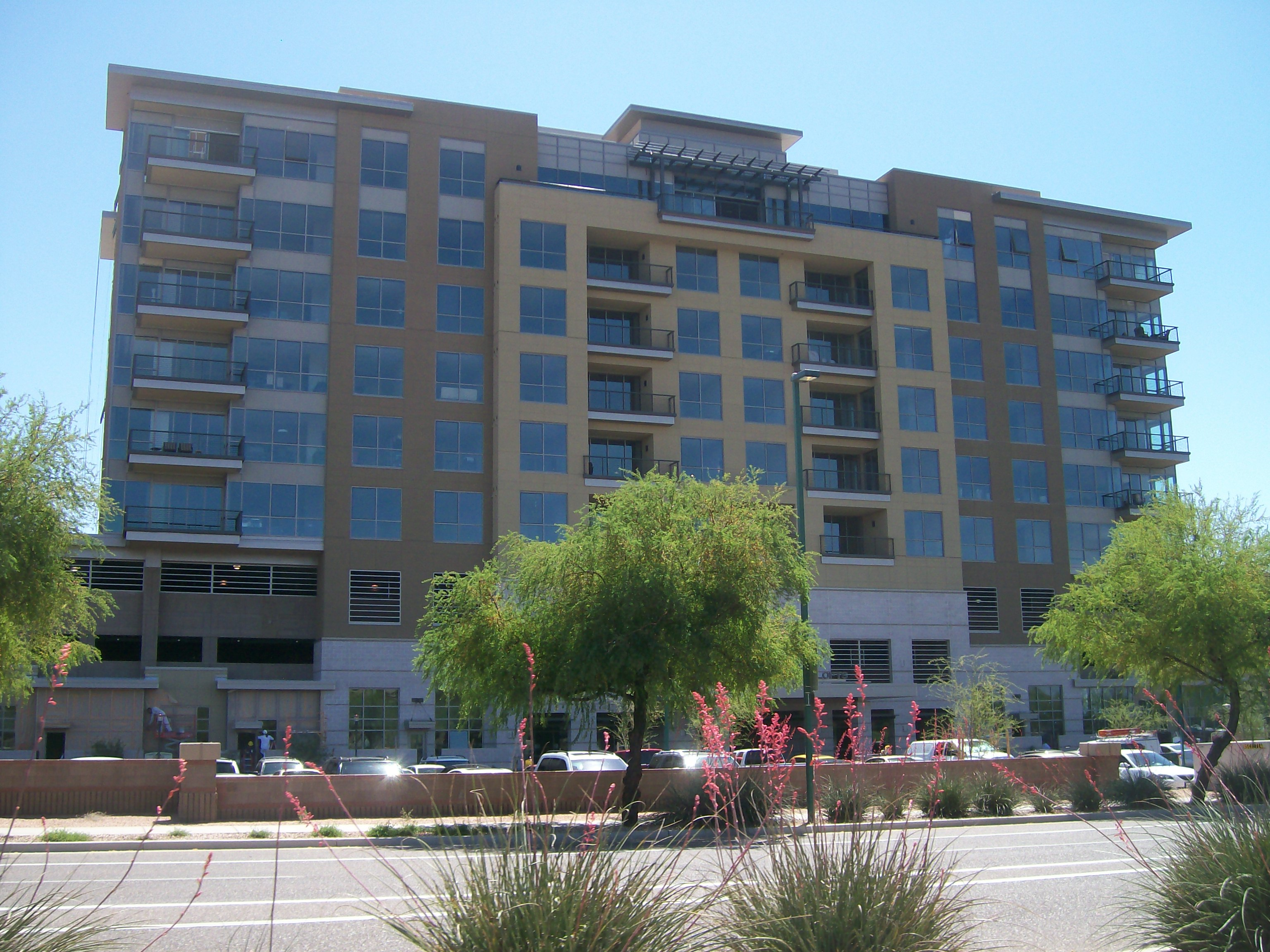
The Plaza Lofts Phase II tower

== See also ==
- Phoenix metropolitan area
- Scottsdale Fashion Square
