= Bank of America Plaza (Tucson) =

Building in downtown Tucson, Arizona

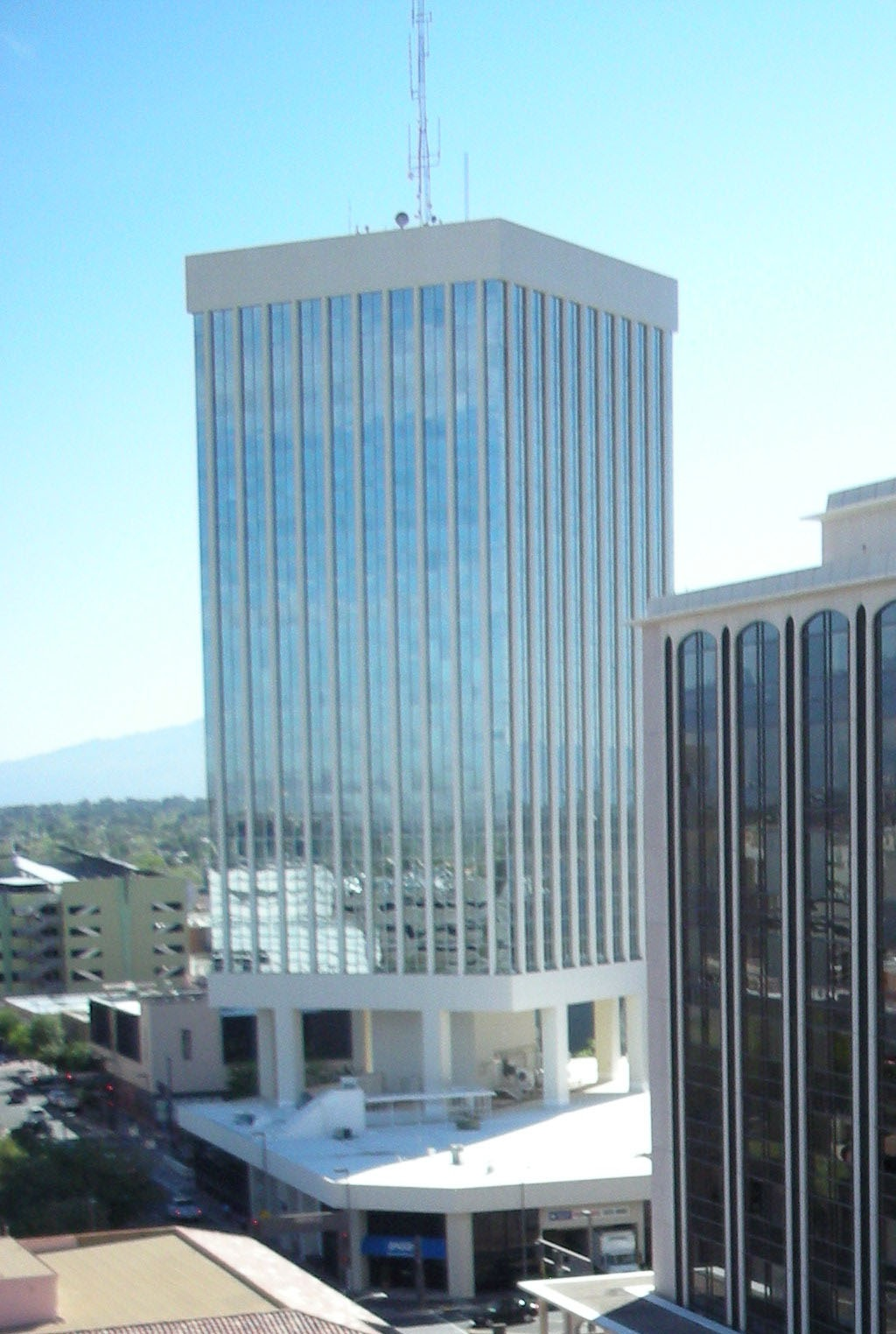
- Interactive map of the Bank of America Plaza area

General information
- Status: Completed
- Type: Government / Office
- Location: 33 North Stone Avenue, Tucson, Arizona, United States
- Coordinates: 32°13′21″N 110°58′18″W
- Completed: 1977
- Owner: Pima County, Arizona

Height
- Roof: 262 ft (80 m)

Technical details
- Floor count: 16
- Floor area: 220,004 sq ft (20,439.0 m^{2})

Design and construction
- Architecture firm: Friedman & Jobusch
- Main contractor: DEFCO Construction Company

The Bank of America Plaza (formally Arizona Bank Plaza) is a high-rise office building which was built in 1977 and is located in downtown Tucson, Arizona. It was designed by Friedman & Jobusch and built by DEFCO Construction Company. It took over the top spot from the Pima County Legal Services Building, which was the tallest building from 1967 to 1977. It was the tallest building in Tucson from the time of its completion in 1977, until 1986, when the UniSource Energy Tower was completed. It is located at 33 North Stone Avenue, at the southwest corner of Stone Avenue and Pennington Street. The Bank of America Plaza is one of three major skyscrapers in the downtown Tucson area that compose the highest part of the city's skyline, the other two being the One South Church (formerly UniSource Energy Tower) and the Pima County Legal Services Building.

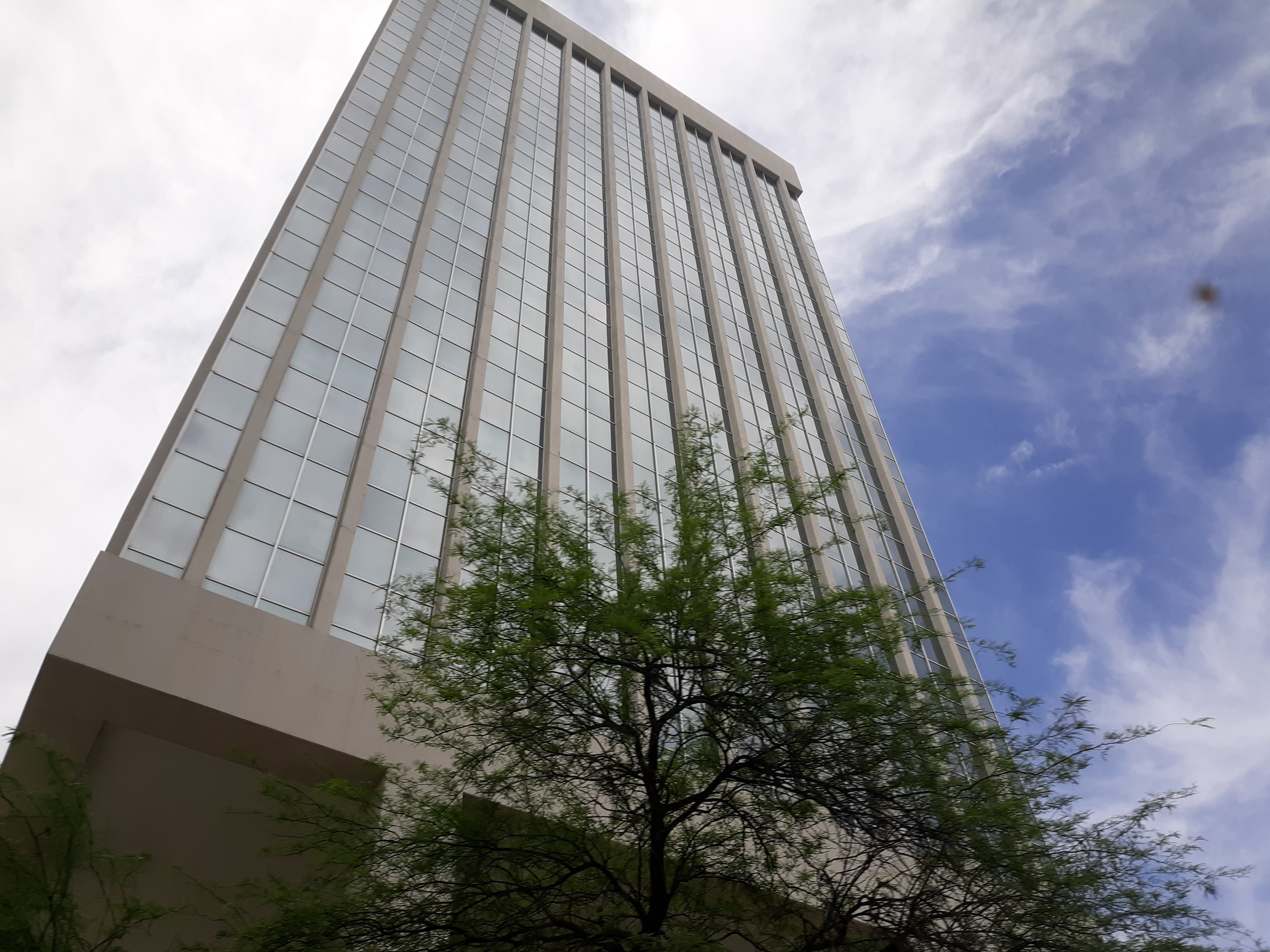
A photo of the tower looking up from the bottom

The government of Pima County purchased the building on May 1, 2007, for $24.1 million. After June 20, 2017, Bank of America vacated the building since its lease with Pima County for the building had expired. The building itself is not vacant, and Bank of America only moved its Tucson regional management to a farther north location. After Bank of America's departure, the county refers to the building by its street address.

== See also ==
- List of tallest buildings in Tucson

Preceded by Pima County Legal Services Building	2nd Tallest Building in Tucson; 1977–1986; 262ft	Succeeded by One South Church
