= Ralph C. Harris =

American architect

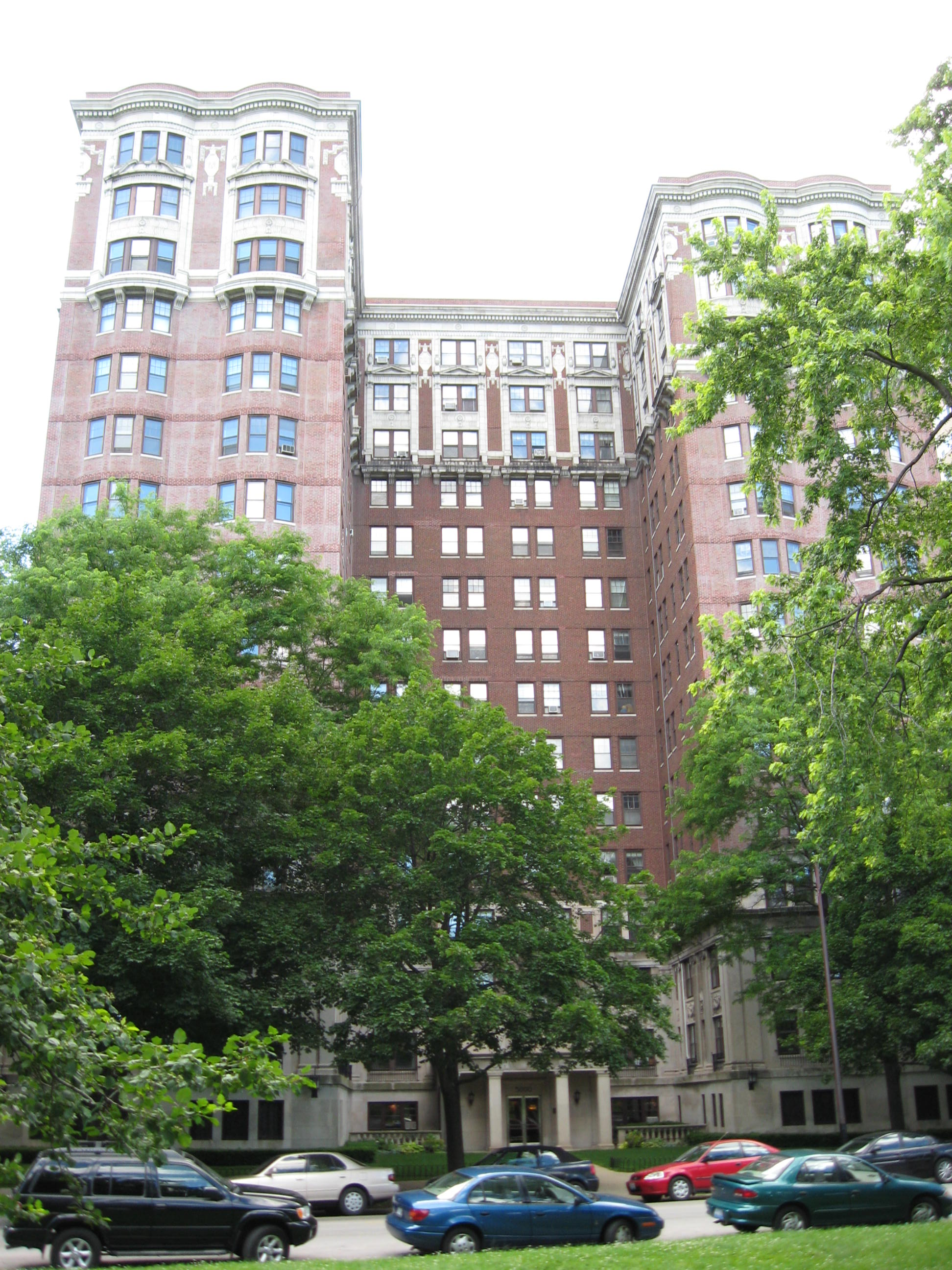
The Aquitania in Chicago, designed by Harris and his then-partner Byron H. Jillson in 1923.

Ralph C. Harris was an architect working in Chicago during the first half of the 20th century. He designed some of the largest hotels and residences of the time: The Aquitania luxury apartment in Uptown, Chicago, 1350 North Astor in Chicago's Gold Coast, Canterbury Court on the Near North Side, and the Tokyo Hotel and his early 1950s modernist co-op 1508 Hinman Ave near Lake Michigan in Evanston, IL. ^{[usurped]}

All of these were, for their time, massive structures. They are fifteen-story buildings, except for Canterbury Court, which is seventeen. The Tokyo Hotel and Canterbury Court are bulky, solid structures which dominate their immediate environment. However, 1350 North Astor and the Aquitania, especially the latter, are airier and more open to the outside. Harris specialized in the Classical Revival style, red brick-clad façades, and terracotta decorations on the upper storeys.

Harris also designed the 1956 residential Phoenix Towers in Phoenix, Arizona, remarkable for its open-air passages on each floor.
