= 3200 Central =

High-rise in Phoenix, Arizona

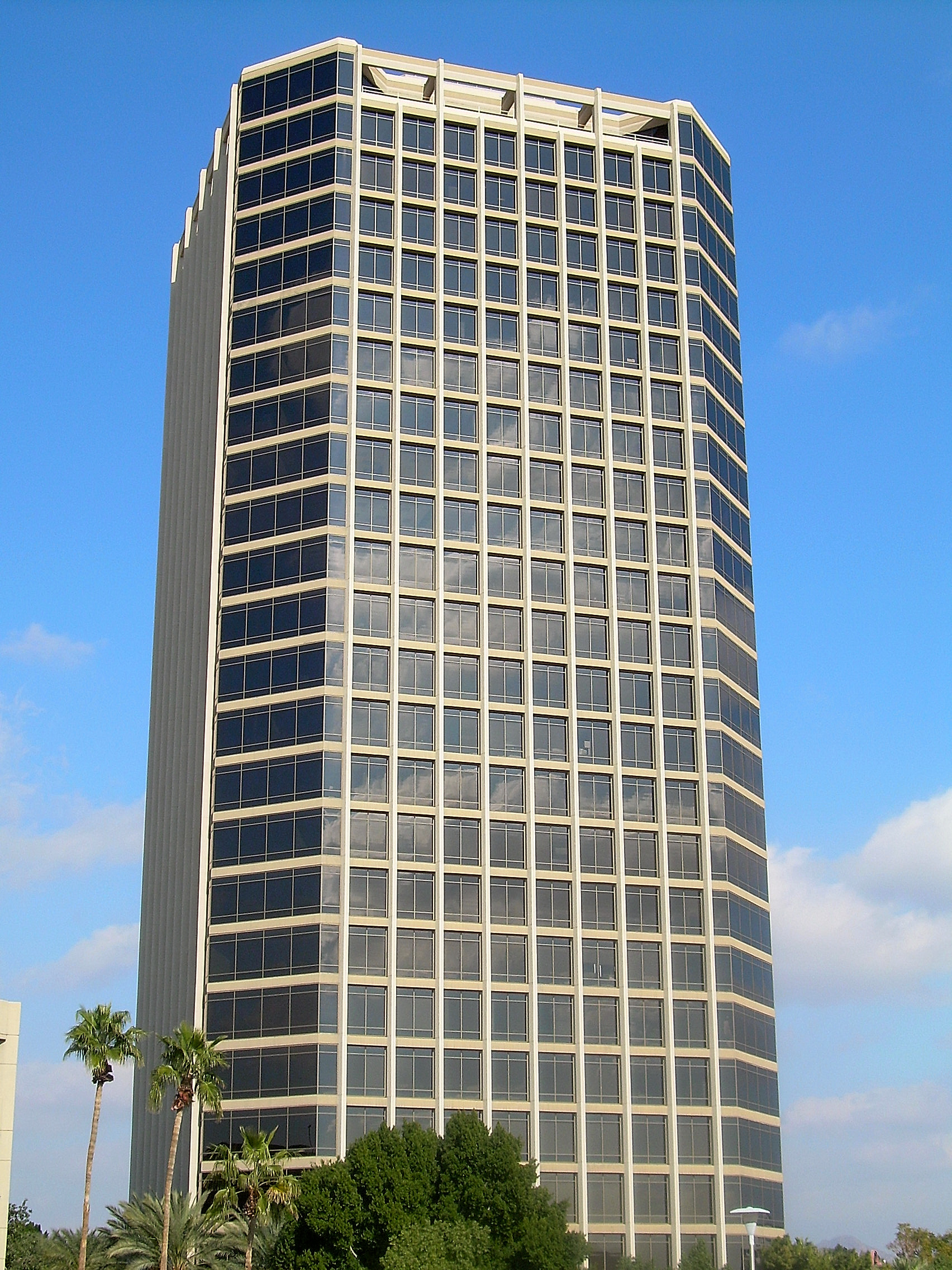
- 3200 Central

General information
- Type: Office
- Location: 3200 North Central Avenue, Phoenix
- Coordinates: 33.4856°N 112.0745°W
- Completed: 1985
- Cost: $49 million
- Owner: DPC Companies and Bridge Commercial Real Estate
- Operator: CBRE, Inc.

Height
- Roof: 320 ft (98 m)

Technical details
- Floor count: 24
- Floor area: 338,482 square feet (31,446 m^{2})
- Lifts/elevators: 8

Design and construction
- Architect: Skidmore, Owings, & Merrill
- Developer: Oxford Properties
- Main contractor: Westbrook Construction

3200 Central, formally known as Great American Tower, is a high-rise office building located along Central Avenue in the Uptown area of Phoenix, Arizona, United States. The tower rises 24 floors and 320 feet (98 m) in height. Owned by DPC Companies and Bridge Commercial Real Estate, 3200 Central was built in 1985. Upon completion it stood as the sixth-tallest building in Phoenix, and today it stands as the 21st-tallest building in the city.

The building was developed by Oxford Properties who also developed its neighbor 3300 North Central Avenue. Skidmore, Owings & Merrill was the architect, and Westbrook Construction was the contractor.

Like its next-door neighbor, 3300 North Central Avenue, 3200 Central is rotated 45 degrees from the street grid. It is, however, an eight sided building with a 45-degree angle cut into each of the four corners. 3200 Central is designed in the Postmodern style. It features exterior columns and spandrels giving the tower an angular, repetitive appearance. The top floor plate is smaller than the rest of the tower and features a balcony, which rings the outer perimeter with the exception of its 45-degree corners.

== See also ==
- List of tallest buildings in Phoenix
