= 3300 North Central Avenue =

High-rise in Phoenix, Arizona

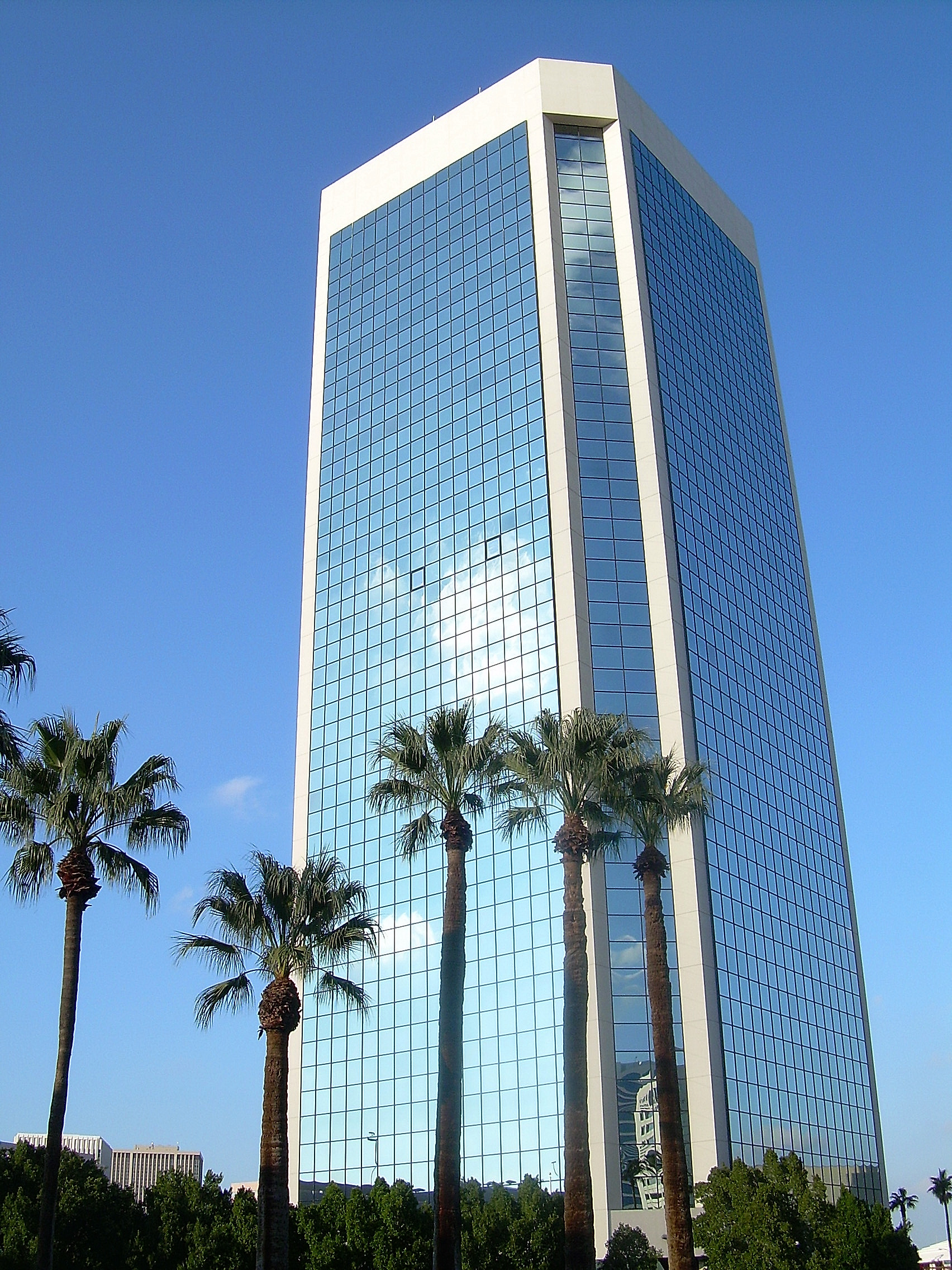
- 3300 North Central Avenue
- Interactive map of the 3300 North Central Avenue area

General information
- Type: Office
- Location: Central Avenue, Uptown Phoenix
- Coordinates: 33.4871°N 112.0744°W
- Completed: 1980
- Owner: State of Arizona (Arizona State Retirement System)
- Management: CB Richard Ellis

Height
- Roof: 356 ft (109 m)

Technical details
- Floor count: 27
- Floor area: 434,474 square feet (40,364 m^{2})
- Lifts/elevators: 8

Design and construction
- Architect: Skidmore, Owings and Merrill
- Developer: Oxford Properties
- Main contractor: Poole Construction

3300 North Central Avenue (also known as 3300 Tower) is a high-rise located along Central Avenue in Uptown Phoenix, Arizona, United States. The tower rises 27 floors and 356 feet (109 m) in height. Designed by Skidmore, Owings and Merrill, 3300 North Central Avenue was built in 1980. Oxford Properties was developer of the project, and Poole Construction was contractor. Upon completion, it stood as the fourth-tallest building in Phoenix and the tallest building outside of Downtown Phoenix. It was built as the headquarters of United Bank of Arizona (later purchased by Citibank, then Norwest). Today, it stands as the 12th-tallest building in the city. It is currently the headquarters of the Arizona State Retirement System.

Like its next door neighbor, the Great American Tower, 3300 North is rotated 45 degrees from the street grid. It is, however, an eight sided building with a 45-degree angle cut into each of the four corners. The building is covered with reflective glass with the exception of the corners, the crown and the lobby, which expose the concrete construction. 3300 North was designed at a time when the architectural trend was shifting away from the International Style and towards Post Modernism and thus, has elements of both architectural styles.

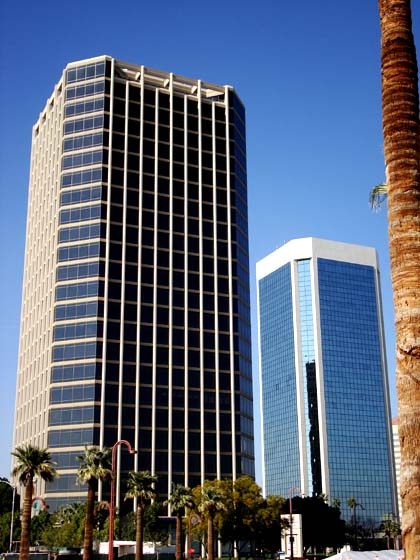
3300 N Central Ave and its similarly shaped neighbor Great American Tower (3300 N is on the right)

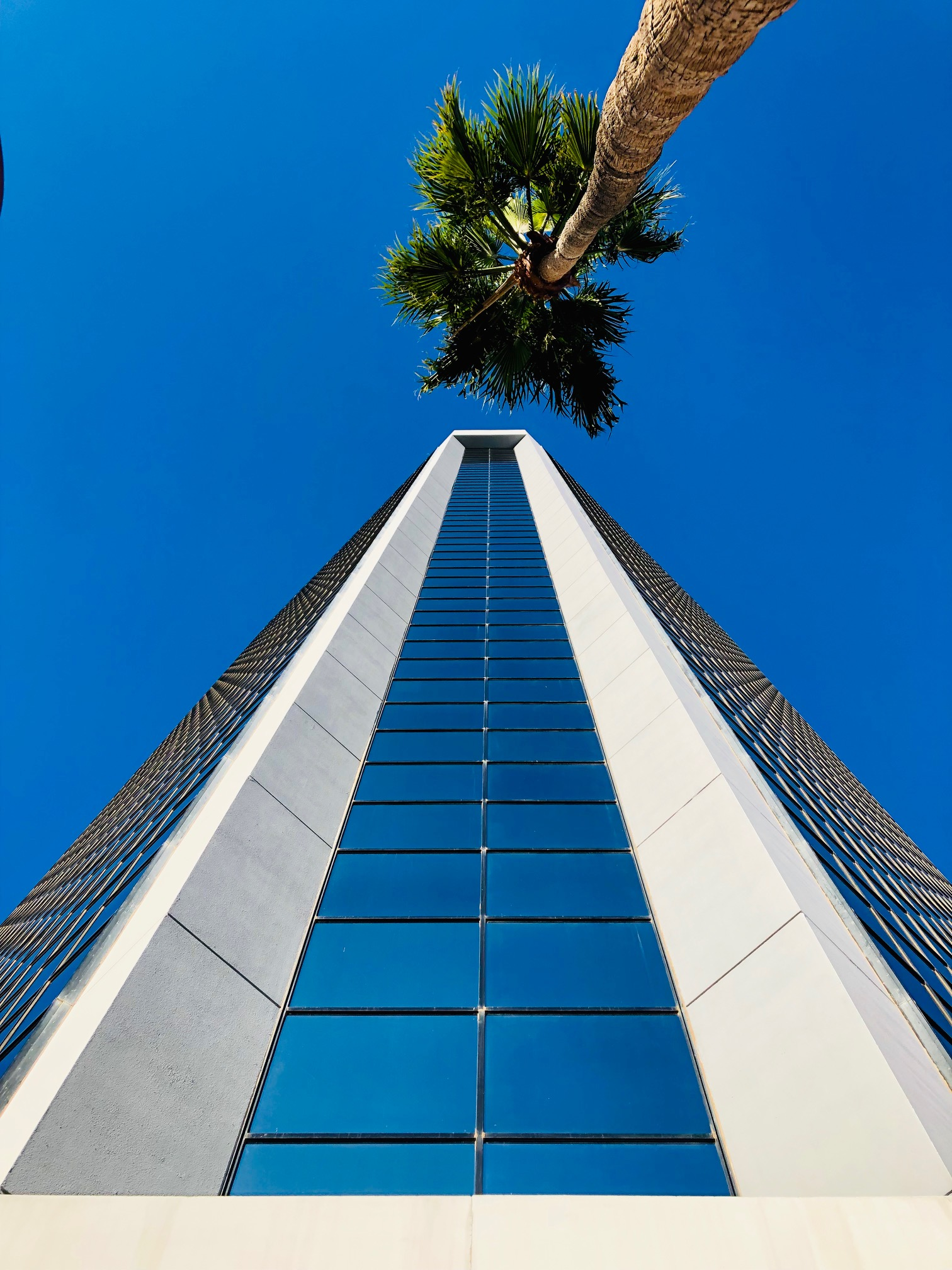
A view up the eastern façade of 3300 N Central Ave.

== See also ==
- List of tallest buildings in Phoenix
