= The Westin Kierland Resort & Spa =

Luxury hotel in Phoenix, Arizona, U.S.

Coordinates: 33°37′33″N 111°55′57″W

- Interactive map of the The Westin Kierland Resort & Spa area
- Hotel chain: Westin Hotels

General information
- Location: Phoenix, Arizona, 6902 E Greenway Parkway
- Groundbreaking: 2000
- Opened: 2002
- Cost: $89,000,000
- Landlord: Marriott International

Height
- Height: 120 ft (36 m)

Technical details
- Floor count: 11

Design and construction
- Architect: Hill Glazier Architects Inc.
- Developer: Woodbine Development Corp., Starwood Hotels & Resorts
- Main contractor: Sundt Construction Inc.

Other information
- Number of rooms: 750
- Number of suites: 63

The Westin Kierland Resort & Spa is a luxury hotel located in the Kierland neighborhood of Phoenix, Arizona. The 11 story hotel opened in 2002 and has 735 rooms. The hotel serves as the centerpiece of the Kierland area with the Kierland Golf Club and Kierland Commons Lifestyle Center. Originally managed by Starwood Hotels and Resorts it is now part of the Marriott portfolio.

== Overview ==
The Westin Kierland was developed by a group of investors led by the southwest division of Woodbine Development Corporation of Dallas, Texas. Woodbine was responsible for much the development of the 730-acre (300 ha) Kierland area which had been started in 1989 as a mixed use development with single and multifamily housing, retail and office space. Starwood Hotels & Resorts of White Plains, New York was another investor who would operate the hotel under their Westin brand. Other investors were Cook Inlet Region Inc. of Anchorage, Alaska and Herbergar Interests of Phoenix. Hill Glazier Architects Inc. of Palo Alto, California was selected as the architect for the hotel. Barry Associates of Los Angeles was the interior designer. Construction of the resort began in 2000 and was undertaken by Sundt Construction Inc. of Phoenix. The hotel opened five months ahead of schedule in 2002 as the largest and tallest hotel in the state of Arizona with 750 rooms situated in connecting wings that ranged from five to eleven floors. Also the hotel has 60,000 square feet (5,600 m^{2}) of event space which Includes the Kierland Grand Ballroom. When it opened the hotel was considered the centerpiece of the Kierland Development. Situated between the existing Kierland Golf Club and Kierland Commons.

In September 2017 Marriott International acquired Starwood Hotels & Resorts and the Westin Kierland came under Marriott management. An AC Marriott Hotel opened on a section of the Westin Kierland's parking lot in January 2021.

The hotel and Kierland development lay on the Phoenix side of the Phoenix/Scottsdale border, however Kierland is within the 85254 Zip Code which has a Scottsdale mailing address which is why it is often thought to be in Scottsdale even though it is in Phoenix proper.
