= Phoenix Towers =

- U.S. National Register of Historic Places
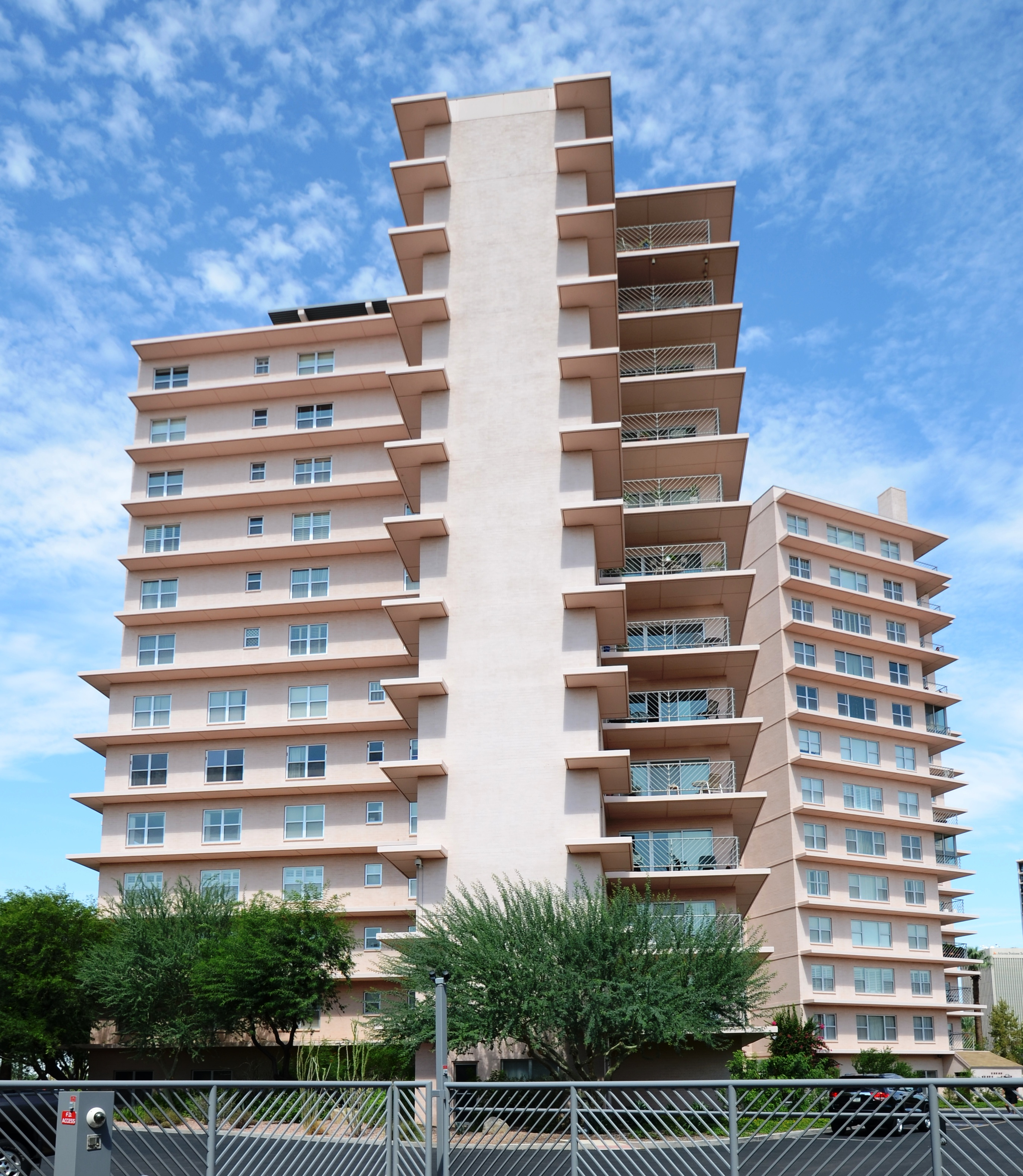

- Location within Arizona Location within the United States
- Location: 2201 N Central Ave., Phoenix, Arizona
- Coordinates: 33°28′17″N 112°4′21″W
- Area: 2.1 acres (0.85 ha)
- Built: 1957
- Built by: Del E. Webb
- Architect: Ralph C. Harris
- Architectural style: Modern Movement
- NRHP reference No.: 07001334
- Added to NRHP: January 2, 2008

The Phoenix Towers were designed by Ralph C. Harris and built by Del E. Webb in Modern Movement style. The buildings, completed in 1957, are located a mile and a half north of downtown Phoenix at the corner of Central Avenue and Monte Vista Road. The main building is 14 stories with four wings forming an X. "Towers" may be misleading, as there is only one high-rise building, but 2 of the wings are much larger than the other two, giving an appearance of separate buildings. The other building included in the National Register of Historic Places site is a low-rise pool house. The projecting concrete ledges on the towers serve as both balconies and as awnings for the apartments below.

The property borders the Heard Museum, which is just east on Monte Vista Road.

The buildings were listed on the National Register of Historic Places in 2008.
