= Tucson House =

Building in Tucson, Arizona, United States

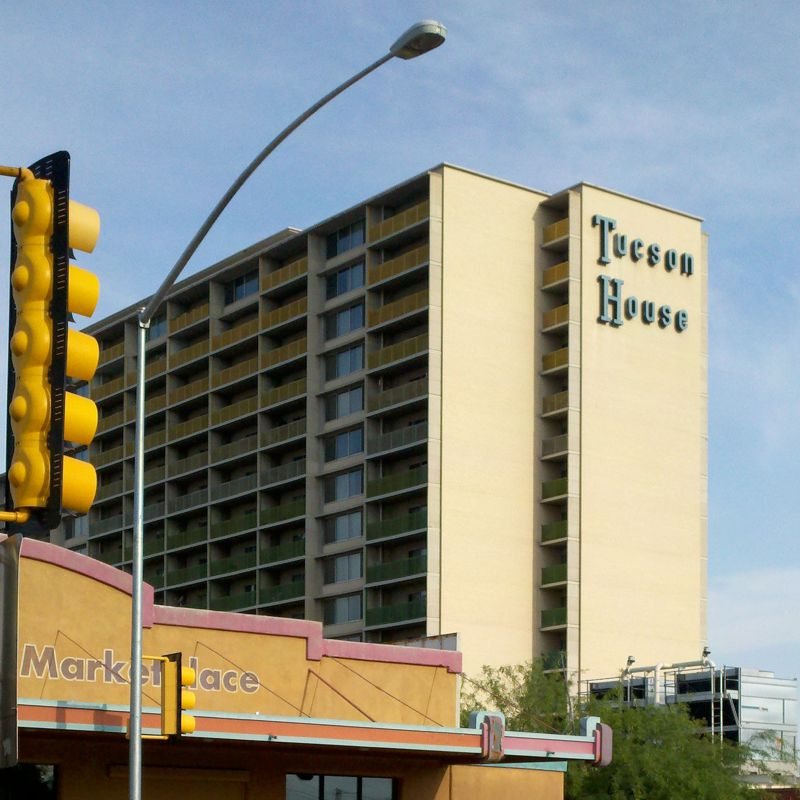
- Tucson House Apartment building

General information
- Status: Completed
- Type: Residential
- Location: 1501 North Oracle Road; Tucson, Arizona, United States
- Coordinates: 32.240246°N 110.97909°W
- Construction started: 1960
- Completed: 1963
- Opening: 1963
- Owner: City of Tucson

Height
- Roof: 195 ft (59.4 m)

Technical details
- Floor count: 17
- Lifts/elevators: 3

Design and construction
- Architects: Lowenberg & Lowenberg, Nicholas G. Sakellar
- Developer: Raymond Schiff & Bernard Robbins
- Main contractor: Robert E. McKee Inc.

Other information
- Number of rooms: 408

Tucson House is a modern residential high-rise that was completed in 1963. The tower is one of the taller buildings in Tucson, Arizona. The building rises 195 feet and has 17 floors. Tucson House was designed by Chicago developers to be a luxury high-rise apartment building, and was the most luxurious residential building in Tucson at that time. It is currently owned by the City of Tucson and utilized as public housing.

== Overview ==
Tucson House was developed in 1960 by Chicago developers Raymond Schiff and Bernard Robbins to be a luxury high-rise apartment building. Lowenberg & Lowenberg of Chicago, and Nicholas G. Sakellar of Tucson were the architects. Robert E. McKee of El Paso and Phoenix was the general contractor. The building was completed in 1963, and at the time it opened, was the most luxurious residential building in Tucson. It was featured in Time Magazine and TV Guide. Units had views to either the north or south, and the entire exterior living room walls opened with sliding doors to balconies. Advertisement brochures for the property described this high-rise apartment house as "a city within a city." Amenities included limousine service, game, recreation, and arts and crafts rooms, beauty shop, barber shop, Laundromat, Olympic sized swimming pool, sauna, ornate lobby, three elevators, extensive security measures, and the 17th floor "penthouse indoor-outdoor solarium.” U.S. Congressman Morris K. Udall was a resident for 2 years during the 1960s. It was also the tallest building in Tucson from 1963 to 1967, and is still the tallest residential building in Tucson.

Even with its unparalleled amenities and initial popularity, the creation of Interstate 10 approximately one mile to the west in the early 1960s proved to be detrimental to Tucson House. The creation of Interstate 10 meant that most traffic bypassed the city core and severely curtailed in-town through traffic. The popularity of many motels and businesses along the once-booming Oracle Road collapsed, and the marketplace dramatically transformed within a decade. By the mid-1970s, Tucson House occupancy declined as the Oracle Area continued to deteriorate, and the federally insured mortgage was foreclosed. The property was auctioned in October 1976 to HUD, which provided a grant to the City of Tucson to purchase it. In 1979, the City of Tucson acquired the 408-unit Tucson House complex and converted it to public housing for the elderly and disabled.

In 2016, a faulty water valve caused residents to be without water for more than 24-hours.

The Blue Moon community garden is in the rear of Tucson House.

== Picture gallery ==
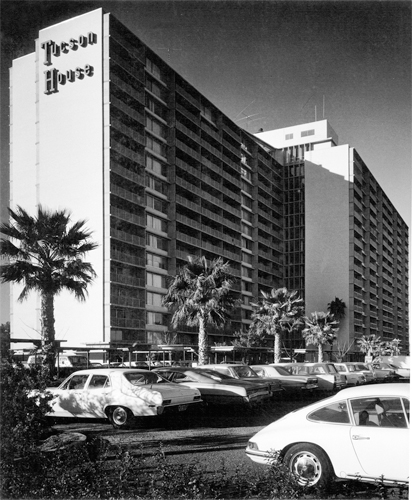
Tucson House vintage photo 1963, view from Oracle Road

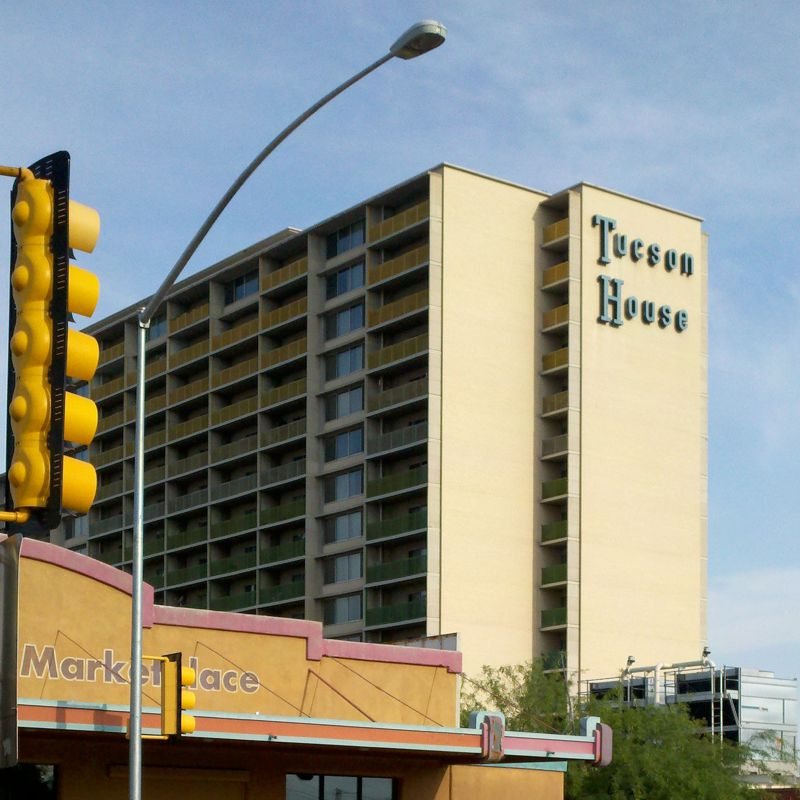
Tucson House 1501 N. Oracle Rd., Tucson, Arizona from Drachman St. - Copy 01

Preceded by Transamerica Building	Tallest Building in Tucson; 1963—1967; 195ft	Succeeded by Pima County Legal Services Building
