= 5151 East Broadway =

Commercial office building in Tucson, Arizona

Coordinates: 32.222646°N 110.882641°W

- Interactive map of the 5151 East Broadway area
- Former names: Great Western Bank Building

General information
- Location: Tucson, Arizona, 5151 E Broadway Blvd
- Groundbreaking: June 8, 1973
- Opened: 1975

Height
- Height: 200 Feet

Technical details
- Floor count: 16
- Floor area: 261,000 Square feet

Design and construction
- Architects: Mascarella, Merry & Associates
- Developer: Philip Wise, Joseph Cesare
- Main contractor: M. M. Sundt Construction Company

5151 East Broadway (5151 E Broadway Blvd, Tucson, AZ) is the largest commercial office building in Tucson, Arizona. It was completed in 1975.

== History ==
Formerly known as the Great Western Bank Building, construction on the building began on June 8 of 1973. Developed by Philip Wise of New York and Tucson's Joseph Cesare, president of the Broadway Reality and Trust Co. of Tucson, the property cost more than $5 million to create. The building was designed by Mascarella, Merry & Associates and built by the M. M. Sundt Construction Company. By the year 1975, tenants of the new Great Western Bank Building were moving their businesses in.

At 261,000 Square feet and 16 stories high, the building was sold to Seldin Real Estate, Inc under the moniker Kent Circle Partners in 2009 and is currently being managed by Picor Commercial Real Estate Services.

Since completion, major interior renovations include the installation of energy efficient appliances, new HVAC systems, and the front lobby was renovated in 2006 with input from Rob Paulus Architects, Industrial Designer Kevin Mills and Caylor Construction.

In 2009, Tucson College signed a 10-year lease with 5151 to aid the expansion of their growing school. Konica Minolta also signed on to be a tenant on the ground floor of the building. A separate area was constructed on one level of 5151 specifically for Tucson College and Konica Minolta.

5151 E. Broadway has recently completed a multimillion-dollar renovation project. The installation of contemporary elevator cabs – including a state-of-the-art modernization program optimizing travel times - is one of a few of its kind in the state of Arizona.

== Events ==
"Climb for the Fallen" is a yearly charity event that occurs in early September at 5151. The event pays tribute to fallen firefighters and police enforcement officers that lost their lives on September 11. Firefighters climb the 17 stories of 5151 a total of seven times in full gear.

The climb started as a way to give back to the families of fallen 343 FDNY Firefighters and the 70 Law Enforcement Officers that lost their lives at the World Trade Center in 2001. However, Climb for the Fallen has grown into an event that also helps local fire stations and the funding of multiple support programs. Each firefighter gives a donation to participate and 100 percent of donations go to helping the families of fallen firefighters and Climb for the Fallen.

The Girl Scouts of Southern Arizona held five annual "Over The Edge" special events at the commercial office tower. The event raised nearly $500,000, between 2015 and 2019.

Tucson Jazz Institute, talented high school student musicians, performed holiday concerts in 2017 and 2019.

== Overview ==
On site amenities include on-site management, a mini market, fitness center, coffee counter and lobby for private events.In addition, companies such as Intelligent office & Tucson Batteries & Roadside Assistance have been established on the 16th floor of the building.

The building also has underground and above-ground parking with a ratio of 5:1,000. Located on the corner of Broadway and Rosemont, 5151 is close to shops, restaurants, movie theaters and other businesses. The total rentable square feet is 247,075. Minimum Divisible leasing size is 600 square feet, while the Maximum Contiguous is 13,686 square feet. The entire lot, including parking, is 352,836 square feet.
