= The Opus Group =

American construction and real estate corporation

Opus
- Formerly: Rauenhorst Corporation (1953–1990)
- Industry: Construction and real estate development
- Founded: 1953
- Founder: Gerald Rauenhorst
- Successor: The Opus Group
- Headquarters: Minnetonka, Minnesota, U.S.
- Area served: United States
- Key people: Gerald Rauenhorst
- Website: Official website

The Opus Group is a group of real estate development, construction, and design companies headquartered in Minneapolis, Minnesota. The company was previously known as Rauenhorst Construction Company.

Rauenhorst was involved in the construction and engineering of Valley Fair in Shakopee, Minnesota. Among other rides, they built the High Roller roller coaster.

Other projects include the Capella Tower in downtown Minneapolis, and the Ameriprise Financial Center.
