= One South Church =

Highrise in Tucson, Arizona

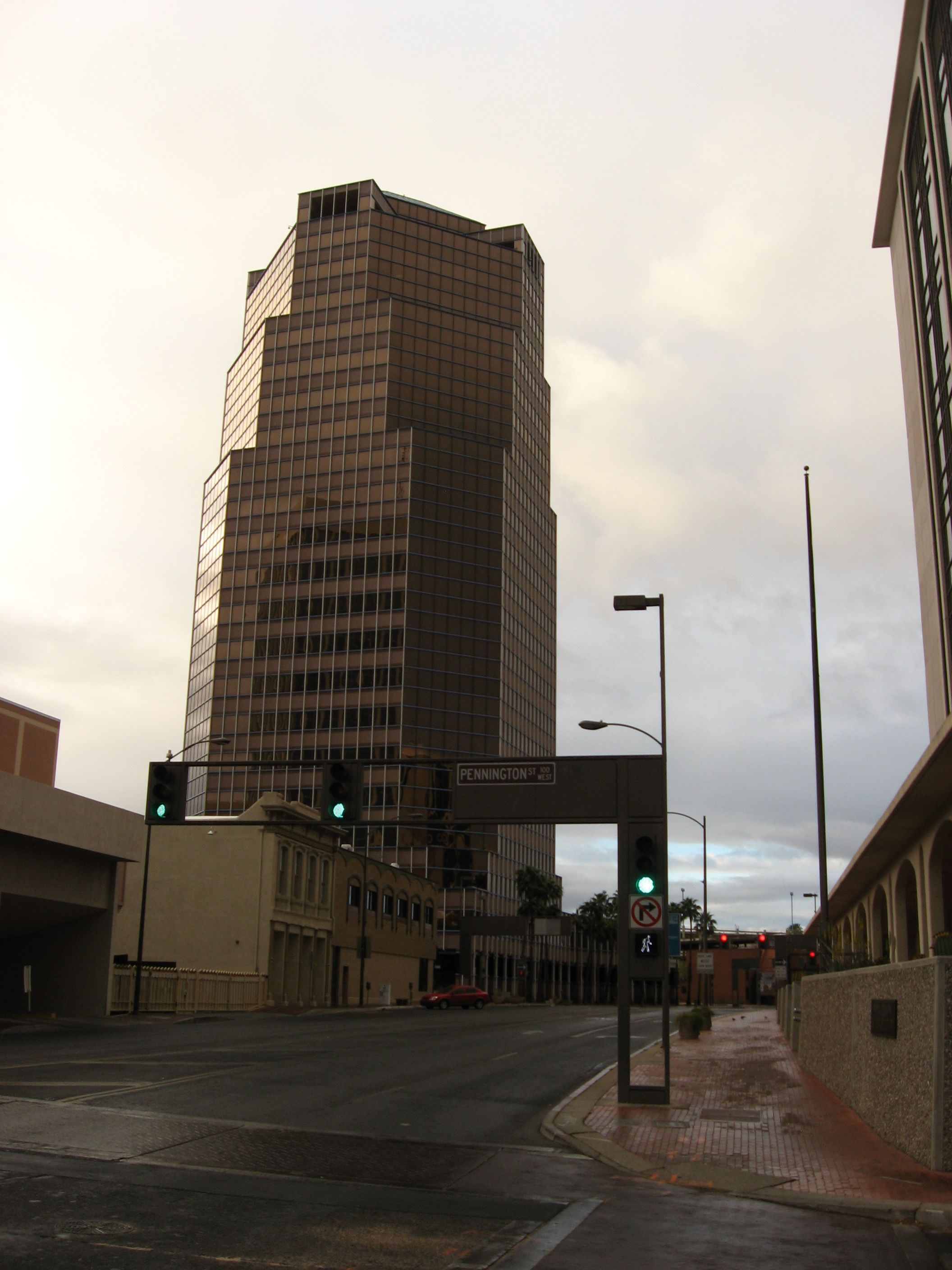
- One South Church Building with its parking garage to the right.

General information
- Status: Completed
- Type: Office
- Location: 1 South Church Avenue. Tucson, Arizona, United States
- Coordinates: 32.2217363°N 110.9720755°W
- Construction started: 1985
- Completed: 1986
- Opening: 1986

Height
- Roof: 330 ft (100.6 m)

Technical details
- Floor count: 23 (+3 below-grade)
- Floor area: 241,000 sq ft (22,400 m^{2})
- Lifts/elevators: 9

Design and construction
- Architect: Fentress Bradburn Associates
- Developer: Reliance Development Group/Venture West Group (joint venture)
- Main contractor: M. M. Sundt Construction Company

Other information
- Parking: 3 subterranean levels

One South Church (formally United Bank Tower and UniSource Energy Tower) is a 23 story office building located in Tucson, Arizona.

At 23 stories high, One South Church is the tallest building in Tucson, and is a prominent fixture in the city's skyline. "The Tallest Building Downtown", or "The One with the Blue Roof" as it is often referred to by locals, is home to a variety of office tenants, including New York Life, Regus, and some of Arizona's largest law firms. The building has its own parking garage located underneath the building.

The tower has been known as the United Bank Tower, Citibank Tower, Norwest Tower and UniSource Energy Tower. It took its current name from its address in 2011, after its largest tenant, UniSource Energy Corp., left the 35,000 square feet it leased across several floors to move to a new headquarters at 88 East Broadway.

The original developer, Venture West/Reliance Development Group, sold the building to Cummings-Baccus Interests in December 2000. Hub Properties Trust bought it in February 2002 and sold it in October 2014 to EQC, a real estate investment company. In 2015 it was bought by ZFI Holdings LLC and Iridius Capital Tucson for $32 million, the first time the building had been owned locally.

The building was designed by Fentress Bradbrum Associates of Denver as one of two twin towers in a city center complex. The second tower was never built. Developers of the project were Reliance Development Group of New York and Venture West Group of Tucson. Construction started in 1985 M. M Sundt Construction Company of Tucson was the general contractor. When opened in 1986 the building was known as the United Bank Tower. It was later known as the UniSource Energy Tower

In October 2015, One South Church was acquired by local ownership group 1SC Partners, LLC, managed by Zach Fenton of ZFI Holdings, LLC.

The Leo Kent Hotel opened in the building's bottom 9 floors in 2023.

== Picture gallery ==
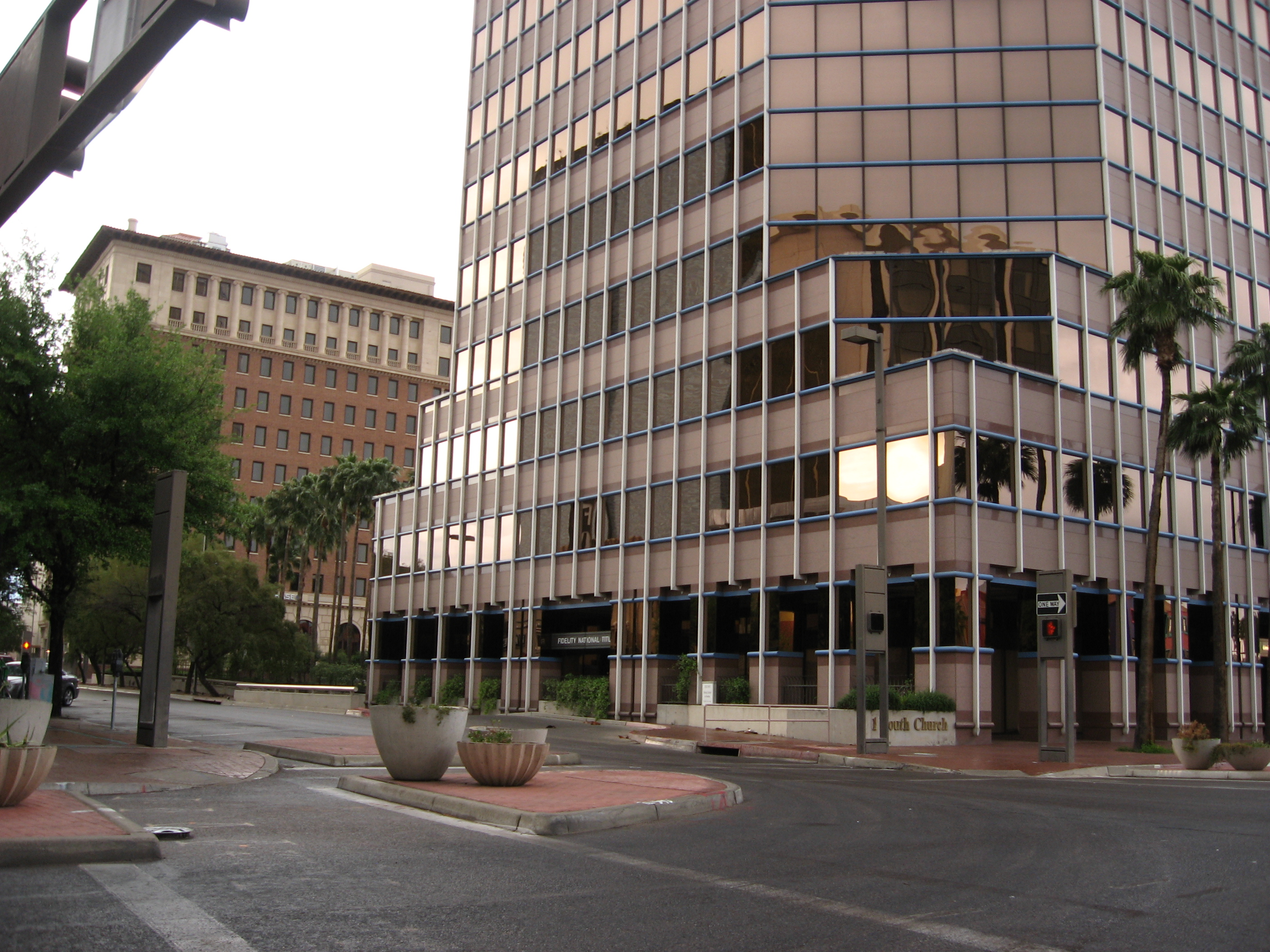
The One South Church Building and South Church Ave.

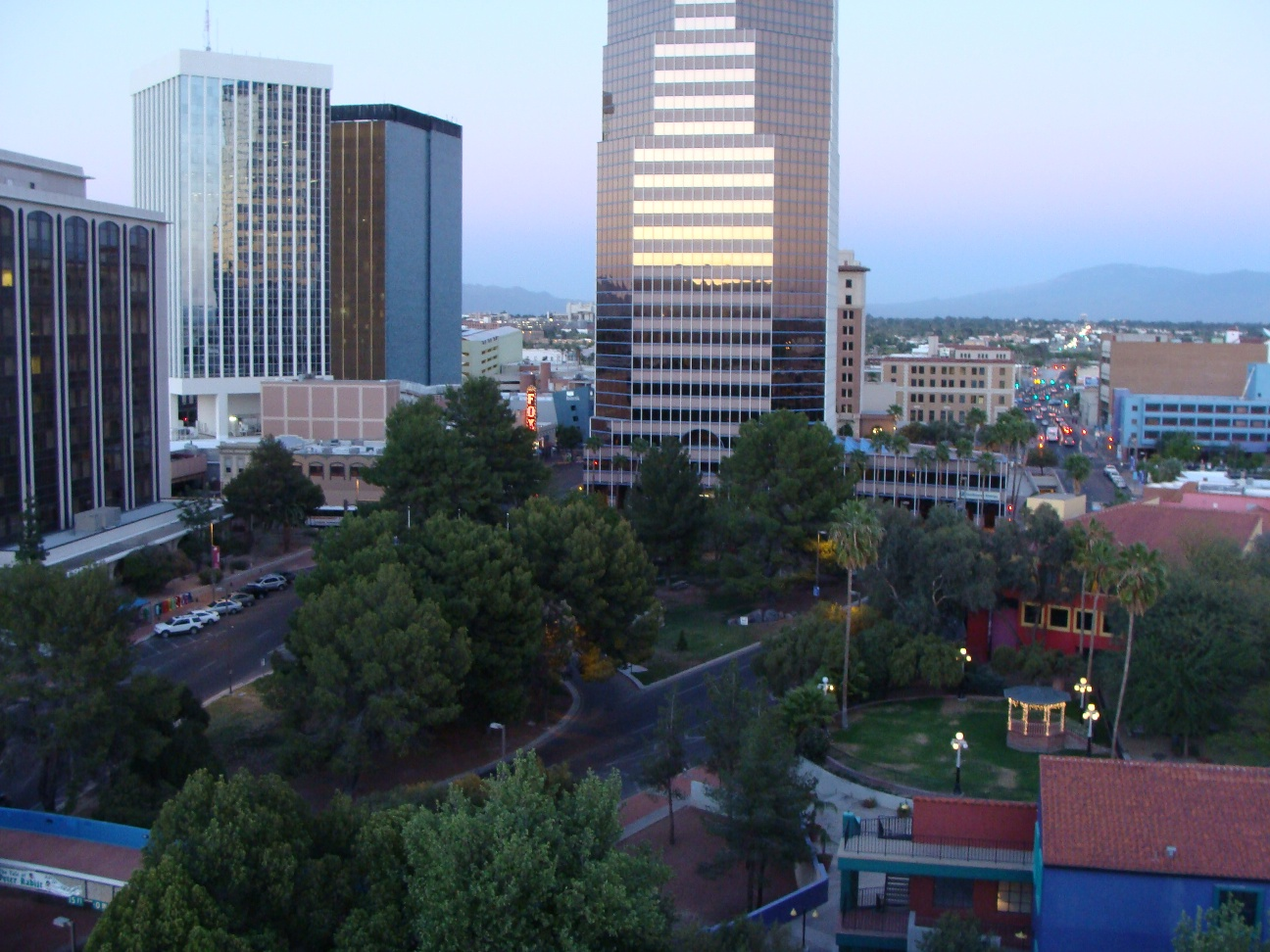

Preceded by Bank of America Plaza	Tallest Building in Tucson; 1986—Present; 330ft	Succeeded by Incumbent
