= National Register of Historic Places listings in Phoenix, Arizona =

Location of Phoenix in Arizona

This is a list of the National Register of Historic Places listings in Phoenix, Arizona.

This is intended to be a complete list of the properties and districts on the National Register of Historic Places in Phoenix, the largest city in Maricopa County, Arizona, United States. The locations of National Register properties and districts for which the latitude and longitude coordinates are included below, may be seen in an online map.

There are 437 properties and districts listed on the National Register in Maricopa County, including 3 that are also National Historic Landmarks. The city of Phoenix is the location of 233 of these properties and districts, including 1 National Historic Landmark; they are listed here, while the remaining properties and districts and 2 National Historic Landmarks are located elsewhere in the county and are listed separately. Twenty properties in Phoenix were once listed, but have since been removed. One property, the George E. Cisney House, has been delisted and relisted.

This National Park Service list is complete through NPS recent listings posted September 18, 2026.

== Current listings ==
	Name on the Register	Image	Date listed	Location	Neighborhood	Description
1	6th Avenue Hotel-Windsor Hotel	6th Avenue Hotel-Windsor Hotel	September 4, 1985 (#85002041)	546 W. Adams; 33°26′57″N 112°04′50″W	Downtown	
2	915 E. Pierce Street/Grand Pyramid House	915 E. Pierce Street/Grand Pyramid House	July 17, 2002 (#02000800)	915 E. Pierce St. 33°26′47″N 112°03′37″W	Garfield	
3	Salim Ackel House	Salim Ackel House	June 10, 1994 (#94000574)	94 E. Monte Vista Rd. 33°28′12″N 112°04′09″W	Encanto	
4	Adams School	Adams School	November 29, 1979 (#79000418)	800 W. Adams St. 33°26′58″N 112°04′58″W	Downtown	
5	W. E. Adams House	W. E. Adams House	January 12, 1995 (#94001524)	1014 S. 1st Ave. 33°26′15″N 112°04′28″W	Central City South	
6	Eliza and Charles Ainsworth House		May 8, 2023 (#100008909)	9 East Country Club Dr. 33°28′49″N 112°03′48″W		
7	Alvarado Historic District	Alvarado Historic District	December 21, 1994 (#94001481)	Roughly bounded by Central Ave., Oak St., 3rd St., and Palm Ln. 33°28′15″N 112°04′12″W	Encanto	
8	Anchor Manufacturing Co.	Anchor Manufacturing Co.	September 4, 1985 (#85002042)	525-551 S. Central; 33°26′32″N 112°04′22″W	Downtown	
9	Helen Anderson House	Helen Anderson House	November 30, 1983 (#83003449)	149 W. McDowell Rd. 33°27′56″N 112°04′41″W	Encanto	Built c. 1920 it is perhaps the best example of English Cottage Revival architecture in Phoenix
10	Anderson-Johannes House	Anderson-Johannes House	January 12, 1995 (#94001525)	127 N. 10th Ave. 33°27′00″N 112°05′05″W	Kenwood	
11	Arizona Academy-North Hall and South Hall	Arizona Academy-North Hall and South Hall	August 12, 1993 (#93000813)	1325 N. 14th St. 33°27′49″N 112°03′03″W	Kenwood	The former academy is now known as the "Stepping Stone Place". The North Hall is now addressed as 1307 and the South Hall as 1305.
12	Arizona Army National Guard Arsenal	Arizona Army National Guard Arsenal	March 31, 2010 (#10000108)	5636 E. McDowell Rd., M5320; 33°27′56″N 111°57′46″W	Camelback East	During WWII the Arizona Army National Guard Arsenal building served as a maintenance shop for German prisoners of War. The building now is houses the Arizona Military Museum.
13	Arizona Compress & Warehouse Co. Warehouse	Arizona Compress & Warehouse Co. Warehouse	September 4, 1985 (#85002044)	215 S. 13th St. 33°26′45″N 112°03′11″W	East Lake Park	
14	Arizona State Capitol Building	Arizona State Capitol Building	October 29, 1974 (#74000455)	1700 W. Washington St. 33°26′53″N 112°05′47″W	Central City	
15	Arizona State Hospital Building	Arizona State Hospital Building	July 15, 2009 (#09000510)	2500 E. Van Buren St. 33°27′08″N 112°01′37″W	Central City	The Arizona State Hospital Building, also known as Mahoney Administration Building, was built in 1900. It is where Winnie Ruth Judd, known as the infamous "Trunk Murderess", was committed on April 24, 1933.
16	Arvizu's El Fresnal Grocery Store	Arvizu's El Fresnal Grocery Store	September 4, 1985 (#85002046)	310 E. Buchanan; 33°26′36″N 112°04′06″W	Downtown	
17	Cline R. Asbury/Riney B. Salmon House	Cline R. Asbury/Riney B. Salmon House	April 8, 2010 (#10000154)	7801 N. Central Ave. 33°33′02″N 112°04′24″W	Alhambra	
18	Ashland Place Historic District	Ashland Place Historic District	December 21, 1994 (#94001486)	Roughly bounded by Central Ave., Vernon Ave., 3rd St., and Oak St. 33°28′26″N 112°04′14″W	Encanto	
19	Frank and Emma Avery House		June 25, 2020 (#100005297)	4203 North 44th St. 33°29′49″N 111°59′13″W		
20	F. S. Baird Machine Shop	F. S. Baird Machine Shop	September 4, 1985 (#85002047)	623 E. Adams; 33°26′57″N 112°03′54″W	Downtown	Now part of Heritage Square
21	Samuel L. Bartlett House	Samuel L. Bartlett House	October 3, 1996 (#96001057)	325 W. Northern Ave. 33°33′11″N 112°04′48″W	Alhambra	
22	J. B. Bayless Store No. 7	J. B. Bayless Store No. 7	September 4, 1985 (#85002048)	825 N. 7th St. 33°27′26″N 112°03′50″W	Downtown	
23	Beadley House No. 11	Beadley House No. 11	November 13, 2017 (#100001786)	4323 E. McDonald Dr. 33°31′29″N 111°59′17″W	Paradise Valley	
24	Bennitt Mansion	Bennitt Mansion	August 12, 2009 (#09000609)	126 E. County Club Dr. 33°28′52″N 112°03′29″W	Encanto	
25	Bethlehem Baptist Church	Bethlehem Baptist Church	August 10, 1993 (#93000744)	1402 E. Adams St. 33°26′59″N 112°01′46″W	East Lake Park	
26	Blount Addition Historic District	Blount Addition Historic District	February 27, 1986 (#86000265)	Northern side of W. Culver St. between Central and 3rd Aves. 33°27′48″N 112°04′31″W	Central City	
27	Boardwalk Apartments Historic District	Boardwalk Apartments Historic District	June 16, 2015 (#15000342)	N. 36th Street; 33°29′52″N 112°00′11″W	Camelback East	
28	Louis J. Bohn and Gertrude Lee House	Louis J. Bohn and Gertrude Lee House	January 24, 2011 (#10001165)	Corner of 8001 N. 7th Street/E. Northern Ave. 33°33′11″N 112°03′53″W	North Mountain	The house is actually located on the corner of 7th Ave. and Northern. Its address is 8001 N. 7th Street.
29	Jorgine Boomer House	Jorgine Boomer House	March 15, 2016 (#16000071)	5808 N. 30th St. 33°31′21″N 112°01′00″W	Camelback East	The house was designed by architect Frank Lloyd Wright
30	Borah House	Borah House	March 15, 2018 (#100002209)	72 East Country Club Dr. 33°28′52″N 112°03′37″W	Encanto	. This house once belonged to Dr. Charles “Charley” Borah (1905 - 1980), an American athlete, who won the gold medal in the 4 × 100 m relay at the 1928 Summer Olympics.
31	Bragg's Pies Building	Bragg's Pies Building	January 16, 2009 (#08001313)	1301 Grand Ave. 33°27′26″N 112°05′23″W	Central City	
32	Brentwood Historic District	Brentwood Historic District	June 9, 2010 (#10000320)	Roughly bounded by Brill St. to the north, 20th St. to the east, Culver St. to the south, 16th St. to the west 33°27′50″N 112°02′36″W	Central City	
33	Brophy College Chapel	Brophy College Chapel	August 10, 1993 (#93000747)	4701 N. Central Ave. 33°30′18″N 112°04′19″W	Alhambra	
34	Brown's Pharmacy	Brown's Pharmacy	September 4, 1985 (#85002049)	1000 E. Pierce; 33°27′21″N 112°03′35″W	Garfield	
35	Burgess Lateral Historic District	Burgess Lateral Historic District	April 16, 2009 (#09000221)	Adjacent to Arcadia Dr. between the Arizona Canal and Lafayette Boulevard, between 47th Pl. and 47th St. 33°29′57″N 111°58′32″W	Camelback East	
36	Camelback 32		January 29, 2025 (#100011361)	3241 East Camelback Road; 33°30′35″N 112°00′39″W		
37	Campus Vista Historic District	Campus Vista Historic District	June 10, 2010 (#10000321)	Roughly bounded by Thomas Rd. and Flower St., 7th and 11th Aves. and Flower St., and Osborn Rd. and 10th and 15th Aves. 33°29′02″N 112°05′13″W	Encanto	Residential neighborhood of primarily ranch-style homes adjacent to Phoenix College and Encanto Park; developed between 1939 and 1956
38	Cartwright School	Cartwright School	August 12, 1993 (#93000739)	5833 W. Thomas Rd. 33°28′48″N 112°11′07″W	Maryvale	
39	Casa Del Northern		February 28, 2022 (#100007472)	300 East Northern Ave. 33°33′11″N 112°04′09″W		
40	William Edward Cavness House	William Edward Cavness House	November 3, 2001 (#01001191)	606 N. 4th Ave. 33°27′16″N 112°04′06″W	Roosevelt	
41	Celebrity Theatre	Celebrity Theatre	January 24, 2019 (#100003323)	440 N. 32nd St. 33°27′16″N 112°00′53″W		
42	Celora Stoddard/Lon Harmon House	Celora Stoddard/Lon Harmon House	November 30, 1983 (#83003451)	801 N. 1st Ave. 33°27′24″N 112°04′26″W	Downtown	
43	Chambers Transfer & Storage Co.	Chambers Transfer & Storage Co.	September 4, 1985 (#85002052)	301 S. 4th Ave. 33°26′41″N 112°04′41″W	Downtown	
44	Chambers Transfer & Storage Co.-Central Warehouse	Chambers Transfer & Storage Co.-Central Warehouse	September 4, 1985 (#85002051)	15-39 E. Jackson; 33°26′41″N 112°04′20″W	Downtown	
45	Cheery Lynn Historic District		December 21, 1994 (#94001485)	16th St. to Randolph Rd. and Earll Dr. to Flower St. 33°29′04″N 112°02′57″W	Encanto	
46	Chelsea Place Historic District		November 30, 1983 (#83003452)	Roughly bounded by W. Lynwood and W. Willetta Sts. between Central and 3rd Aves. 33°27′51″N 112°04′31″W	Central City	
47	George E. Cisney House	George E. Cisney House	September 8, 2015 (#94001528)	916 E. McKinley St. 33°27′25″N 112°03′39″W	Garfield	Property first listed January 12, 1995; delisted April 6, 2015; relisted September 8, 2015
48	H. M. Coe House	H. M. Coe House	January 11, 1995 (#94001529)	365 N. 4th Ave. 33°27′13″N 112°04′41″W	Downtown	
49	Coffelt-Lamoreaux Homes Historic District	Coffelt-Lamoreaux Homes Historic District	December 31, 2014 (#14001081)	19th Ave to I-17; Buckeye Rd to Durango Curve; 33°26′04″N 112°05′59″W	Central City South	The city's oldest active public housing development, begun in 1953.
50	Concrete Block House	Concrete Block House	November 30, 1983 (#83003456)	640 N. 6th Ave. 33°27′22″N 112°04′51″W	Roosevelt	
51	Ralph Converse House	Ralph Converse House	April 8, 2010 (#10000153)	6617 N. Central Ave. 33°32′01″N 112°04′23″W	Alhambra	
52	Colonel Edward Power Conway House	Colonel Edward Power Conway House	January 24, 2011 (#10001164)	7625 N. 10th St. 33°32′51″N 112°03′38″W	North Mountain	
53	Neil and Louise Cook House	Neil and Louise Cook House	November 22, 2016 (#16000782)	5725 North 20th Pl. 33°31′15″N 112°02′16″W	Camelback East	
54	Copeland & Tracht Service Station	Copeland & Tracht Service Station	September 4, 1985 (#85002054)	1702 W. Van Buren; 33°27′06″N 112°05′43″W	Central City	Historic Copeland & Trachet Service Station, now Granpa Sal's Tires, built in 1925
55	Coronado Neighborhood Historic District	Coronado Neighborhood Historic District	February 13, 1986 (#86000206)	Roughly bounded by Virginia Ave., 14th St., McDowell Rd., and 7th St.; also roughly bounded by 13th St., Coronado Rd., 14th St., and Monte Vista Rd., and the western side of 13th St. between Monte Vista and Oak; 33°28′17″N 112°03′28″W	Encanto	This is the Albert and Mary Garcia House located at 2201 N Dayton St. Albert Garcia became Arizona’s first Hispanic Assistant Attorney General, from 1937 until 1942. The house is in the Historic Coronado District.
56	Country Club Park Historic Subdivision		December 21, 1994 (#94001484)	Thomas Rd. to Virginia Ave. and 7th St. to Dayton St. 33°28′41″N 112°03′41″W	Encanto	
57	Craig Mansion	Craig Mansion	August 18, 1992 (#92001013)	131 E. Country Club Dr. 33°28′48″N 112°03′25″W	Encanto	
58	Del Norte Place Historic District	Del Norte Place Historic District	December 21, 1994 (#94001482)	Virginia Ave. to Encanto Boulevard and 15th to 17th Aves. 33°28′30″N 112°05′34″W	Encanto	This Tudor Revival Residence is located at 1614 W. Vernon Ave. and was built in 1936. It is in the historic "Del Norte Place Historic District".
59	Lester D. DeMund House	Lester D. DeMund House	January 6, 1995 (#94001520)	363 E. Monte Vista; 33°28′17″N 112°03′57″W	Encanto	
60	Adam Diller House	Adam Diller House	January 24, 2011 (#10001163)	8702 N. 7th Ave. 33°33′51″N 112°04′59″W	North Mountain	The house is also known as the "Lightning Z Ranch House"
61	J. B. Doughterty and C. W. Peterson House	J. B. Doughterty and C. W. Peterson House	January 12, 1995 (#94001540)	2141-2143 W. Washington St. 33°26′53″N 112°06′13″W	Central City	
62	Lewis Douglas House	Lewis Douglas House	February 8, 1985 (#85000188)	815 E. Orangewood Ave. 33°32′57″N 112°04′02″W	Alhambra	
63	Dunbar School	Dunbar School	August 12, 1993 (#93000740)	707 W. Grant; 33°26′31″N 112°05′04″W	Central City South	Dunbar School built in 1925
64	Charles H. Dunlap House	Charles H. Dunlap House	November 30, 1983 (#83003466)	650 N. 1st Ave. 33°27′23″N 112°04′28″W	Downtown	
65	Durand Grocery	Durand Grocery	October 1, 1985 (#85002891)	901 Grand Ave. 33°27′12″N 112°05′05″W	Downtown	
66	Earll Place Historic District		June 9, 2006 (#06000468)	1620-1722 E. Pinchot Ave. and 1617-1731 and 1736 E. Earll Dr. 33°29′01″N 112°02′42″W	Encanto	
67	East Alvarado Historic District	East Alvarado Historic District	February 18, 2000 (#00000102)	E. Alvarado Rd. between 3rd and 7th Sts. 33°28′20″N 112°04′00″W	Encanto	
68	East Evergreen Historic District		June 10, 2010 (#10000322)	Roughly bounded by McDowell Rd., 3rd St., 7th St., and Wiletta St. 33°27′53″N 112°04′03″W	Central City	
69	El Chaparral	El Chaparral	September 8, 2011 (#11000631)	4935 E. Lafayette Blvd. 33°29′51″N 111°58′28″W	Camelback East	
70	El Zaribah Shrine Auditorium	El Zaribah Shrine Auditorium	March 9, 1989 (#89000168)	1502 W. Washington St. 33°26′55″N 112°05′27″W	Central City	El Zaribah Shrine Auditorium (now the Polly Rosenbaum Building) built in 1921
71	Elder-Moffitt House	Elder-Moffitt House	January 30, 1995 (#94001605)	1336 W. Taylor St. 33°27′36″N 112°05′21″W	Story	
72	Elizabeth Seargeant-Emery Oldaker House	Elizabeth Seargeant-Emery Oldaker House	November 30, 1983 (#83003472)	649 N. 3rd Ave. 33°27′24″N 112°04′36″W	Roosevelt	
73	Ellis-Shackelford House	Ellis-Shackelford House	November 30, 1983 (#83003475)	1242 N. Central Ave. 33°27′44″N 112°05′02″W	Story	The Ellis-Shackelford House was built in 1917
74	Encanto Manor Historic District	Encanto Manor Historic District	June 10, 2010 (#10000323)	Roughly bounded by 7th and 15th Aves. and Thomas Rd. and Edgemont Ave. 33°28′48″N 112°05′13″W	Encanto	Primarily post-World War II (1945–1959) upscale residential neighborhood development which also includes Dorris House (Casa de Rosas), built in 1911
75	Encanto-Palmcroft Historic District	Encanto-Palmcroft Historic District	February 16, 1984 (#84000696)	Roughly bounded by N. 7th and 15th Aves., McDowell and Thomas Rds.; also Holly St. from 15th Ave. to 12th Ave. and 12th from Holly to Encanto Boulevard; also roughly bounded by Encanto Blvd., Coronado Rd., 7th Ave. and 15th Ave.; also 2700 N. 15th Ave. 33°28′21″N 112°05′10″W	Encanto	Second through fourth sets of addresses represent boundary increases
76	Encanto Vista Historic District	Encanto Vista Historic District	June 10, 2010 (#10000324)	Roughly bounded by 7th Ave, Encanto Blvd, Windsor Ave, and Encanto Park Municipal Golf Course; 33°28′33″N 112°05′01″W	Encanto	The Dr. Norton House built in 1912, located in the Encanto Vista Historic District
77	Abner Elliot England-Guy Hidden Lawrence House	Abner Elliot England-Guy Hidden Lawrence House	January 24, 2011 (#10001162)	6234 N. Central Ave. 33°31′43″N 112°04′28″W	Alhambra	The Abner Elliot England-Guy Hidden Lawrence House was built in 1929
78	Evans House	Evans House	September 1, 1976 (#76000375)	1108 W. Washington St. 33°26′54″N 112°05′11″W	Downtown	Dr. Evans' House was built in 1893
79	Executive Towers	Executive Towers	January 17, 2017 (#100000455)	207 W. Clarendon Ave. 33°29′29″N 112°04′47″W	Encanto	
80	Eyrich-Kohl House	Eyrich-Kohl House	January 12, 1995 (#94001530)	1015 Woodland Ave. 33°27′03″N 112°05′08″W	Central City	
81	Fairview Place Historic District	Fairview Place Historic District	December 21, 1994 (#94001483)	Encanto Boulevard to McDowell Rd., 15th Ave. to the alley west of 17th Ave. 33°28′10″N 112°05′34″W	Encanto	
82	Firestone	Firestone	October 1, 1985 (#85002892)	302 W. Van Buren; 33°27′06″N 112°04′38″W	Downtown	Historic Firestone building built in 1925
83	First Baptist Church	First Baptist Church	February 8, 1982 (#82002081)	302 W. Monroe St. 33°27′02″N 112°04′39″W	Downtown	First Baptist Church built in 1923
84	First Church of Christ, Scientist	First Church of Christ, Scientist	August 10, 1993 (#93000745)	924 N. 1st St. 33°27′30″N 112°04′20″W	Downtown	
85	First Presbyterian Church	First Presbyterian Church	August 10, 1993 (#93000746)	402 W. Monroe St. 33°27′02″N 112°04′43″W	Downtown	First Presbyterian Church built in 1892
86	Franklin School	Franklin School	August 12, 1993 (#93000814)	1625 W. McDowell Rd. 33°27′55″N 112°05′39″W	Story	Location of Franklin Police and Fire High School
87	Fry Building-Baxter Block	Fry Building-Baxter Block	September 4, 1985 (#85002056)	146 E. Washington; 33°26′54″N 112°04′15″W	Downtown	Fry building built in 1891
88	Garfield Historic District	Garfield Historic District	June 10, 2010 (#10000325)	Roughly bounded by 7th St. on the west, 16th St. on the east, Roosevelt St. on the north, and Van Buren St. on the south 33°27′18″N 112°03′23″W	Garfield	
89	Garfield Methodist Church	Garfield Methodist Church	August 10, 1993 (#93000743)	1302 E. Roosevelt St. 33°27′33″N 112°03′11″W	Garfield	
90	Neil H. Gates House	Neil H. Gates House	August 11, 1986 (#86002646)	4602 N. Elsie Ave. 33°30′15″N 111°57′11″W	Camelback East	
91	General Sales Company Warehouse	General Sales Company Warehouse	October 4, 2016 (#16000681)	515 E. Grant St. 33°26′27″N 112°04′01″W	Downtown	
92	Gerardo's Building	Gerardo's Building	September 4, 1985 (#85002057)	421 S. 3rd St. 33°26′36″N 112°04′08″W	Downtown	
93	Carter W. Gibbes House	Carter W. Gibbes House	August 25, 1983 (#83002992)	2233 N. Alvarado; 33°28′19″N 112°04′11″W	Encanto	
94	Grace Lutheran Church	Grace Lutheran Church	August 12, 1993 (#93000835)	1124 N. 3rd St. 33°27′39″N 112°04′09″W	Central City	
95	Grand Avenue Commercial Historic District		August 19, 2024 (#100010434)	723-1845 Grand Ave., 718-734 W. Polk St., 1205 W. Pierce St., 1348 W. Roosevelt St., 1107 N. Laurel St. 33°27′15″N 112°05′10″W		
96	Lois Grunow Memorial Clinic	Lois Grunow Memorial Clinic	September 4, 1985 (#85002065)	926 E. McDowell; 33°27′58″N 112°03′38″W	Encanto	Entrance of the Lois Grunow Memorial Clinic built in 1931
97	Burgess A. Hadsell House	Burgess A. Hadsell House	January 12, 1995 (#94001531)	1001 E. Fillmore St. 33°27′17″N 112°03′34″W	Garfield	
98	George M. Halm and Mary Alverda Howard House	George M. Halm and Mary Alverda Howard House	January 24, 2011 (#10001161)	6850 North Central Ave. 33°32′16″N 112°04′28″W	Alhambra	
99	Hanny's	Hanny's	September 6, 1985 (#85002058)	44 N. 1st St. 33°26′57″N 112°04′19″W	Downtown	
100	Sarah and Jack Harelson House	Sarah and Jack Harelson House	April 6, 2010 (#10000152)	4437 E. Arlington Rd. 33°31′01″N 111°59′06″W	Camelback East	
101	Heard Building	Heard Building	September 4, 1985 (#85002059)	112 N. Central; 33°26′59″N 112°04′24″W	Downtown	The Heard Building, built in 1920, was Phoenix's first skyscraper. The building was featured in Alfred Hitchcocks 1960 film "Psycho"
102	Hedgpeth Hills Petroglyph Site	Hedgpeth Hills Petroglyph Site	February 16, 1984 (#84000718)	3711 West Deer Valley Road; 33°41′01″N 112°08′30″W	Deer Valley	Hohokam Petroglyph is that of a "scene". In the far right hand corner of the Petroglyph the Hohokams sketched two deers bumping heads.
103	George Hidden House	George Hidden House	January 11, 1995 (#94001532)	763 E. Moreland St. 33°27′40″N 112°03′48″W	Garfield	
104	Franklin Hilgeman House	Franklin Hilgeman House	June 26, 2017 (#100001229)	333 W. Loma Ln. 33°33′14″N 112°04′47″W	North Mountain	
105	Fred G. Hilvert House	Fred G. Hilvert House	October 11, 2016 (#16000700)	106 E. Country Club Dr. 33°28′52″N 112°03′33″W	Encanto	
106	Hohokam-Pima Irrigation Sites	Hohokam-Pima Irrigation Sites	October 15, 1966 (#66000184)	Address Restricted		
107	Hotel Westward Ho	Hotel Westward Ho	February 19, 1982 (#82002082)	618 N. Central Ave. 33°27′18″N 112°04′26″W	Downtown	
108	House at 818 South 1st Avenue	House at 818 South 1st Avenue	January 12, 1995 (#94001538)	818 S. 1st Ave. 33°26′22″N 112°04′28″W	Central City South	
109	L. Ron Hubbard House	L. Ron Hubbard House	November 23, 2009 (#09000953)	5501 N. 44th St. 33°31′02″N 111°59′10″W	Camelback East	
110	William K. Humbert House	William K. Humbert House	December 1, 1983 (#83003476)	2238 N. Alvarado Rd. 33°28′21″N 112°04′14″W	Encanto	
111	Hunt Bass Hatchery Caretaker's House	Hunt Bass Hatchery Caretaker's House	January 23, 2003 (#02001723)	Phoenix Zoo grounds, 455 N. Galvin Parkway; 33°27′06″N 111°56′49″W	Camelback East	
112	Hunt's Tomb	Hunt's Tomb	June 12, 2008 (#08000526)	625 N. Galvin Pkwy, Papago Park; 33°27′07″N 111°56′40″W	Camelback East	
113	Hurley Building	Hurley Building	September 4, 1985 (#85002062)	536 and 544-548 W. McDowell and 1601 N. 7th Ave. 33°27′57″N 112°04′54″W	Encanto	
114	Idylwilde Park Historic District		February 5, 1998 (#98000054)	Roughly bounded by 11th and 12th Sts., Weldon, and Fairmont Aves. 33°29′27″N 112°03′23″W	Encanto	
115	Immaculate Heart of Mary	Immaculate Heart of Mary	August 10, 1993 (#93000742)	909 E. Washington St. 33°26′53″N 112°03′40″W	Downtown	
116	Judge Fred C. Jacobs House	Judge Fred C. Jacobs House	January 24, 2011 (#10001169)	6224 N. Central Ave. 33°31′41″N 112°04′28″W	Alhambra	Judge Fred C. Jacobs' House was built in 1928
117	Jefferson Hotel	Jefferson Hotel	September 30, 2019 (#100004509)	101 S. Central Ave. (1 E. Jefferson St.); 33°26′49″N 112°04′26″W		
118	Kenilworth Elementary School	Kenilworth Elementary School	March 25, 1982 (#82002083)	1210 N. 5th Ave. 33°27′44″N 112°04′49″W	Roosevelt	
119	Kenilworth Historic District		November 30, 1983 (#83003478)	Roughly bounded by W. Lynwood and W. Willetta Sts. between 3rd and 7th Aves., and W. Culver St. between 5th and 7th Aves.; also 312 W. Culver St. 33°27′49″N 112°04′48″W	Roosevelt	Culver St. address represents a boundary increase
120	King's Rest Hotel Motor Court	King's Rest Hotel Motor Court	August 26, 1987 (#87001882)	801 S. 17th Ave. 33°26′21″N 112°05′41″W	Central City South	
121	Denison Kitchel House	Denison Kitchel House	May 19, 1994 (#94000448)	2912 E. Sherran Lane; 33°29′24″N 112°01′04″W	Camelback East	
122	Knights of Pythias Building	Knights of Pythias Building	September 4, 1985 (#85002063)	829 N. 1st Ave. 33°27′27″N 112°04′27″W	Downtown	
123	Walter Wesley Knorpp House	Walter Wesley Knorpp House	January 20, 2023 (#100008580)	77 East Country Club Dr. 33°28′51″N 112°03′37″W		Designed by master architect H.H. Green who is also credited with the design of the Heard Museum. Built in 1929 for Walter Wesley Knorpp, Owner/Publisher of the Arizona Republic and Phoenix Gazette from 1929 to 1944, and Owner/Manager of KTAR Radio during the same years.
124	Kinter K. Koontz House	Kinter K. Koontz House	July 20, 2011 (#11000463)	7620 N. 7th St. 33°32′52″N 112°03′57″W	Alhambra	
125	La Hacienda Historic District	La Hacienda Historic District	February 13, 2009 (#09000002)	Bounded by N. 3rd St. to the west, N. 7th St. to the east, E. Catalina Dr. to the north, and E. Thomas Rd. to the south 33°28′52″N 112°04′02″W	Encanto	
126	C. A. Larson House	C. A. Larson House	January 12, 1995 (#94001533)	710 S. 1st Ave. 33°26′27″N 112°04′28″W	Downtown	
127	Los Olivos Historic District		June 10, 2010 (#10000326)	The 300 block of E Monte Vista Rd. 33°28′16″N 112°04′02″W	Encanto	
128	Luhrs Building	Luhrs Building	January 26, 2024 (#85003561)	11 W. Jefferson; 33°26′50″N 112°04′29″W		
129	Margarita Place Historic District	Margarita Place Historic District	April 12, 2007 (#07000279)	Bounded by Thomas Rd., Windsor Ave., 15th And 16th Ave. 33°28′47″N 112°05′33″W	Encanto	The Vlassis Ruzow and Associates Building is located at 1545 W. Thomas Road. The building is considered historical by the Phoenix Historic Preservation Office.
130	Maricopa County Courthouse	Maricopa County Courthouse	February 10, 1989 (#88003237)	125 W. Washington St. 33°26′53″N 112°04′29″W	Downtown	The historical “Miranda rights” was established in this court after the arrest of Ernesto Miranda
131	James H. McClintock House	James H. McClintock House	October 4, 1990 (#90001525)	323 E. Willetta St. 33°27′49″N 112°03′56″W	Central City	
132	Colonel Willard H. McCornack House	Colonel Willard H. McCornack House	March 13, 2020 (#100005074)	85 North Country Club Dr. 33°29′09″N 112°03′51″W		
133	Medlock Place Historic District	Medlock Place Historic District	June 1, 2006 (#06000434)	Roughly bounded by Missouri Ave., Camelback Rd., 7th Ave., and Central Ave. 33°29′42″N 112°04′39″W	Encanto	
134	Miracle Mile Historic District		September 20, 2022 (#100008193)	1325-1812 East McDowell Rd. 33°27′57″N 112°03′09″W		
135	Monroe School	Monroe School	August 26, 1977 (#77000237)	215 N. 7th St. 33°27′00″N 112°03′50″W	Downtown	Monroe High School built in 1914
136	David Morgan-Earl A. Bronson House	David Morgan-Earl A. Bronson House	January 24, 2011 (#10001168)	8030 N. Central Ave. 33°33′15″N 112°04′28″W	Alhambra	The David Morgan-Earl A. Bronson House, built 1927.
137	North Central Avenue Streetscape Historic District	North Central Avenue Streetscape Historic District	November 30, 2005 (#05001346)	Central Ave. between Bethany Home Rd. and the Arizona Canal; 33°31′26″N 112°04′25″W	Alhambra	
138	North Encanto Historic District	North Encanto Historic District	January 24, 2007 (#06001262)	Roughly bounded by 15th and 18th Aves., Thomas to Osborn Rds. 33°29′03″N 112°05′41″W	Encanto	
139	North Garfield Historic District	North Garfield Historic District	June 10, 2010 (#10000327)	Roughly bounded by 7th St. on the west, 16th St. on the east, Roosevelt St. on the south, and Interstate 10 on the north 33°27′36″N 112°03′23″W	Garfield	
140	Oakland Historic District	Oakland Historic District	July 10, 1992 (#92000847)	Roughly bounded by Fillmore St., 19th Ave., Van Buren St., and Grand Ave. 33°27′12″N 112°05′31″W	Central City	The Crown Filter Queen Building is located at 1800 W. Van Buren Ave. The building is considered historical by the Phoenix Historic Preservation Office. Boundary increase/decrease on March 9, 2001, #01000164
141	George A. Olney/Everett E. Ellinwood House	George A. Olney/Everett E. Ellinwood House	April 8, 2010 (#10000155)	6810 N. Central Ave. 33°32′13″N 112°04′28″W	Alhambra	
142	The Olympus Condominiums		September 13, 2024 (#100010859)	6502 N. Central Avenue; 33°31′52″N 112°04′26″W		
143	Ong Yut Geong Wholesale Market	Ong Yut Geong Wholesale Market	September 4, 1985 (#85002066)	502 S. 2nd St. 33°26′35″N 112°04′10″W	Downtown	
144	Jim Ong's Market	Jim Ong's Market	July 8, 1982 (#82002084)	1110 E. Washington St. 33°26′55″N 112°03′28″W	Central City	
145	Orpheum Theater	Orpheum Theater	September 4, 1985 (#85002067)	209 W. Adams; 33°26′57″N 112°04′33″W	Downtown	
146	William Lewis Osborn House	William Lewis Osborn House	May 15, 1991 (#91000544)	1266 W. Pierce Ave. 33°27′23″N 112°05′23″W	Central City	
147	Palm Lane Gardens	Palm Lane Gardens	December 22, 2009 (#09001112)	101-115 E. Palm La. 33°28′10″N 112°04′16″W	Encanto	
148	E. Payne Palmer House	E. Payne Palmer House	May 2, 2002 (#02000420)	6012 N. Central Ave. 33°31′28″N 112°04′27″W	Alhambra	
149	Pay'n Takit No. 5	Pay'n Takit No. 5	September 4, 1985 (#85002069)	1012 N. 7th Ave. 33°27′32″N 112°04′55″W	Story	
150	Pay'n Takit No. 13	Pay'n Takit No. 13	September 4, 1985 (#85002068)	1402 E. Van Buren; 33°27′06″N 112°03′04″W	Garfield	
151	Pay'n Takit No. 25	Pay'n Takit No. 25	September 5, 1985 (#85002070)	1753-1755 W. Van Buren; 33°27′04″N 112°05′50″W		Pay'n Takit No. 25, built in 1926, now (2012) houses Central United "A boxing club"
152	Sarah H. Pemberton House	Sarah H. Pemberton House	September 5, 2017 (#100001557)	1121 N. 2nd St. 33°27′39″N 112°04′15″W		
153	Phoenix Building and Loan House	Phoenix Building and Loan House	January 12, 1995 (#94001534)	1138-1140 E. Taylor St. 33°27′14″N 112°03′24″W		
154	Phoenix Carnegie Library and Library Park	Phoenix Carnegie Library and Library Park	November 19, 1974 (#74000456)	1101 W. Washington St. 33°26′51″N 112°05′10″W		The Phoenix Carnegie Library was built in 1907
155	Phoenix Elementary School District No. 1 Administration Building	Phoenix Elementary School District No. 1 Administration Building	October 17, 1997 (#95001076)	331 N. 1st Ave. 33°27′08″N 112°04′25″W		
156	Phoenix Homesteads Historic District	Phoenix Homesteads Historic District	October 13, 1987 (#87001430)	Roughly bounded by Flower and 28th Sts., Pinchot Ave., and 26th St.; boundary increase (listed October 15, 2010): Roughly bounded by Pinchot and Flower Sts., 26th to 28th Sts. 33°29′01″N 112°01′21″W		
157	Phoenix Indian School Historic District	Phoenix Indian School Historic District	May 31, 2001 (#01000521)	300 E. Indian School Rd. 33°29′51″N 112°04′10″W		Image is of the main building of the historic Phoenix Indian School built in 1891
158	Phoenix LDS Second Ward Church	Phoenix LDS Second Ward Church	November 30, 1983 (#83003492)	1120 N. 3rd Ave. 33°27′56″N 112°04′37″W		
159	Phoenix Motor Company	Phoenix Motor Company	November 1, 2018 (#100003064)	401 W Van Buren St. 33°27′05″N 112°04′45″W		Originally called the Day (Dud R.) Motor Company
160	Phoenix Seed & Feed Company	Phoenix Seed & Feed Company	September 4, 1985 (#85002071)	411 S. 2nd St. 33°26′38″N 112°04′11″W		
161	Phoenix Towers	Phoenix Towers	January 2, 2008 (#07001334)	2201 N. Central Ave. 33°28′17″N 112°04′21″W		
162	Phoenix Townsite	Phoenix Townsite	November 7, 1978 (#78000550)	Bounded by 6th, 7th, Monroe, and Adams Sts. 33°26′59″N 112°03′54″W		Now part of Heritage Square
163	Phoenix Union Colored High School	Phoenix Union Colored High School	May 2, 1991 (#91000543)	415 E. Grant St. 33°26′22″N 112°04′00″W		Phoenix Union Colored High School built in 1926. The school was renamed the George Washington Carver High School
164	Phoenix Union High School Historic District	Phoenix Union High School Historic District	July 15, 1982 (#82002085)	512 E. Van Buren; 33°27′10″N 112°03′51″W		Phoenix Union High School built in 1912
165	Harry E. Pierce House	Harry E. Pierce House	November 30, 1983 (#83003493)	632 N. 3rd Ave. 33°27′22″N 112°04′37″W		
166	N. Clyde Pierce House	N. Clyde Pierce House	January 8, 1998 (#97001602)	4505 E. Osborn Rd. 33°29′13″N 111°58′59″W		
167	Pieri-Elliot House	Pieri-Elliot House	December 29, 1983 (#83003500)	767 E. Moreland St. 33°27′40″N 112°03′41″W		
168	Pierson Place		September 5, 2019 (#100004344)	Roughly bounded by Central & 7th Aves., Camelback Rd. & Grand Canal; 33°30′24″N 112°04′41″W		
169	Pioneer Military and Memorial Park	Pioneer Military and Memorial Park	February 1, 2007 (#06001317)	13th to 15th Aves., Jefferson to Harrison Aves. 33°26′44″N 112°05′25″W		Grave site of Jacob "Dutchman" Waltz located in the "City/Loosley Cemetery" section.
170	Portland Street Historic District	Portland Street Historic District	November 30, 1983 (#83003491)	W. Portland St. between 3rd and 7th Aves. 33°27′35″N 112°04′46″W		
171	Charles H. Pratt House	Charles H. Pratt House	November 7, 1996 (#96001274)	4979 E. Camelback Rd. 33°30′20″N 111°58′20″W		
172	Professional Building	Professional Building	January 8, 1993 (#85003563)	137 N. Central; 33°27′00″N 112°04′22″W		
173	Pueblo Grande Ruin	Pueblo Grande Ruin	October 15, 1966 (#66000185)	4619 E. Washington Ave. 33°26′32″N 111°59′00″W		
174	Rancho Arroyo	Rancho Arroyo	September 12, 2003 (#03000901)	6737 N. 20th St. 33°32′10″N 112°02′15″W		
175	Rancho Joaquina House	Rancho Joaquina House	July 9, 1984 (#84000786)	4630 E. Cheery Lynn Rd. 33°29′06″N 111°58′51″W		
176	Regency House	Regency House	September 20, 2016 (#16000630)	2323 N. Central Ave. 33°28′25″N 112°04′25″W		
177	Rehbein Grocery	Rehbein Grocery	October 1, 1985 (#85002895)	1231 Grand Ave. 33°27′24″N 112°05′19″W		
178	Roman Roads	Roman Roads	November 21, 2018 (#100003124)	1691 E Maryland Ave. 33°31′52″N 112°02′46″W		
179	Roosevelt Historic District	Roosevelt Historic District	November 30, 1983 (#83003490)	Roughly bounded by Portland and Fillmore Sts., Central and 7th Aves. 33°27′29″N 112°04′40″W		The historic Harry J. Felch House was built in 1927 and is located on 525 W. Lynwood Street in Phoenix, AZ. The Dutch Colonial Home is located in Phoenix’s historic Roosevelt District.
180	John M. Ross House	John M. Ross House	February 24, 2000 (#00000145)	6722 N. Central Ave. 33°31′36″N 112°04′27″W		
181	Dr. Roland Lee Rosson House	Dr. Roland Lee Rosson House	June 3, 1971 (#71000112)	139 N. 6th St. 33°27′00″N 112°03′58″W		Now part of Heritage Square
182	Royale Gardens II		September 21, 2022 (#100008192)	1904-1944 East Medlock Dr. 33°30′42″N 112°02′27″W		
183	Sacred Heart Church	Sacred Heart Church	March 20, 2012 (#12000124)	920 S. 17th St. 33°26′04″N 112°03′22″W		
184	Sacred Heart Home for the Aged	Sacred Heart Home for the Aged	February 2, 2010 (#05001548)	1110 N. 16th St. 33°27′39″N 112°02′56″W		
185	St. Mary's Church	St. Mary's Church	November 29, 1978 (#78000551)	231 N. 3rd St. 33°27′02″N 112°04′06″W		
186	San Carlos Hotel	San Carlos Hotel	December 8, 1983 (#83003498)	202 N. Central Ave. 33°27′02″N 112°04′23″W		
187	Security Center	Security Center	September 12, 1985 (#85002081)	234 N. Central; 33°27′04″N 112°04′24″W		Security Building built in 1925; listing had a boundary increase and renaming (to "Security Center") in 2026.
188	M. J. Sharp House	M. J. Sharp House	January 12, 1995 (#94001535)	1012 S. 1st Ave. 33°26′15″N 112°04′28″W		
189	Shell Oil Co.	Shell Oil Co.	September 4, 1985 (#85002073)	425 S. 16th Ave. 33°26′34″N 112°05′31″W		
190	E. W. Skinner House	E. W. Skinner House	January 12, 1995 (#94001536)	917 E. Roosevelt St. 33°27′31″N 112°03′38″W		
191	Walter Lee Smith House	Walter Lee Smith House	January 24, 2011 (#10001167)	7202 N. 7th Ave. 33°32′30″N 112°05′08″W		
192	Smurthwaite House	Smurthwaite House	May 17, 2001 (#01000479)	1317 W. Jefferson St. 33°26′48″N 112°05′21″W		Built in 1897, the house was formerly located at 602 N. 7th St., Phoenix
193	Dr. Bertram L. Snyder House	Dr. Bertram L. Snyder House	June 21, 2024 (#100010454)	8122 N. 10th Avenue; 33°33′21″N 112°05′10″W		
194	Squaw Peak Inn	Squaw Peak Inn	July 19, 1996 (#96000760)	4425 E. Horseshoe Rd. 33°33′56″N 111°59′02″W		
195	C.P. Stephens DeSoto Six Motorcars	C.P. Stephens DeSoto Six Motorcars	February 20, 2013 (#13000019)	915 N. Central Ave. 33°27′30″N 112°04′26″W		
196	Storage Warehouse	Storage Warehouse	September 4, 1985 (#85002074)	429 W. Jackson; 33°26′41″N 112°04′44″W		Refrigeration ice was stored in this building, thus the name Storage Warehouse. It was built in 1920 and known as the Constable Ice and Fuel Co.
197	F. Q. Story Neighborhood Historic District	F. Q. Story Neighborhood Historic District	March 24, 1988 (#88000212)	McDowell Rd., 7th Ave., Roosevelt St., and 16th Ave.; also roughly bounded by 17th Ave., Culver St., 15th Ave. and Lynwood St., plus lots on Roosevelt St. and McDowell Rd. 33°27′41″N 112°05′15″W		Second set of addresses represent a boundary increase
198	Ralph H. Stoughton Estate	Ralph H. Stoughton Estate	July 3, 1985 (#85001475)	805 W. South Mountain Ave. 33°22′12″N 112°05′09″W		
199	Courtney and Hilda Stubbs House	Courtney and Hilda Stubbs House	January 24, 2011 (#10001166)	1245 E. Ocotillo Rd. 33°32′04″N 112°03′16″W		
200	Sun Mercantile Building	Sun Mercantile Building	September 4, 1985 (#85002075)	232 S. 3rd St. 33°26′43″N 112°04′13″W		
201	Sutton Place		June 9, 2022 (#100007785)	Osborn Rd. and 26th St. 33°29′16″N 112°01′34″W		
202	Swindall Tourist Inn	Swindall Tourist Inn	September 7, 1995 (#95001081)	1021 E. Washington St. 33°26′53″N 112°03′31″W		This is the only remaining hotel in Phoenix that served as public accommodation for African Americans during the era of segregation. Built in 1913 as a private home for the Steyaert family, Mrs. Steyaert used it for boarding, securing the home’s important function as temporary housing for traveling African Americans.
203	Temple Beth Israel	Temple Beth Israel	February 22, 2011 (#11000043)	122 E Culver St. 33°27′46″N 112°04′18″W		
204	Title and Trust Building	Title and Trust Building	September 4, 1985 (#85002076)	112 N. 1st Ave. 33°26′58″N 112°04′29″W		U-shaped towers were built in 1931
205	Tovrea Castle	Tovrea Castle	March 28, 1996 (#96000309)	5041 E. Van Buren; 33°26′55″N 111°58′16″W		
206	Judge Charles Austin Tweed House	Judge Charles Austin Tweed House	May 14, 1987 (#87000775)	1611 W. Fillmore Ave. 33°27′17″N 112°05′37″W		
207	U.S. Courthouse and Federal Office Building	U.S. Courthouse and Federal Office Building	March 29, 2021 (#100006317)	230 North 1st Ave. 33°27′04″N 112°04′31″W		
208	U.S. Post Office	U.S. Post Office	February 10, 1983 (#83002993)	522 N. Central Ave. 33°27′15″N 112°04′25″W		
209	Union Station	Union Station	November 25, 1985 (#85003056)	4th Ave. and Southern Pacific railroad tracks 33°26′39″N 112°04′42″W		
210	Valley National Bank Branch No. 10		November 22, 2021 (#100007157)	1845 East McDowell Rd. 33°27′57″N 112°02′29″W		
211	Valley Plumbing & Sheet Metal	Valley Plumbing & Sheet Metal	October 1, 1985 (#85002894)	530 W. Adams; 33°26′58″N 112°04′48″W		This is not the correct building photo per the NRHP nomination form. The correct building is to the right.
212	Verde Park Pumphouse	Verde Park Pumphouse	September 7, 1995 (#95001078)	Junction of 9th St. and Van Buren Ave. 33°27′09″N 112°03′37″W		
213	Victoria Place Historic District	Victoria Place Historic District	April 18, 1988 (#88000384)	700 block of E. McKinley St. 33°27′24″N 112°03′46″W		
214	Villa del Coronado	Villa del Coronado	December 22, 2009 (#09001113)	100-190 E. Coronado Rd. 33°28′03″N 112°04′14″W		
215	Villa Verde Plat A and Villa Verde Plat B Historic District	Villa Verde Plat A and Villa Verde Plat B Historic District	June 10, 2010 (#10000328)	Roughly bounded by Monte Vista Rd., Granada Rd., 19th Ave., and 20th Ave. 33°28′11″N 112°06′04″W		
216	George H. Vradenburg House	George H. Vradenburg House	April 8, 2010 (#10000156)	1600 W. Colter St. 33°30′49″N 112°05′38″W		
217	J. W. Walker Building-Central Arizona Light & Power	J. W. Walker Building-Central Arizona Light & Power	September 4, 1985 (#85002077)	10 N. 3rd Ave. and 300 W. Washington; 33°26′54″N 112°04′38″W		
218	Webster Auditorium	Webster Auditorium	June 14, 1990 (#90000823)	1201 N. Galvin Parkway; 33°27′35″N 111°56′30″W		
219	Welnick Arcade Market and Liefgreen Seed Company Building	Welnick Arcade Market and Liefgreen Seed Company Building	August 9, 2016 (#16000490)	341-345 W. Van Buren St. 33°27′05″N 112°04′43″W		
220	Western Wholesale Drug Co. Warehouse	Western Wholesale Drug Co. Warehouse	September 4, 1985 (#85002078)	101 E. Jackson; 33°26′41″N 112°04′16″W		
221	Westwood Village and Estates Historic District		November 29, 2021 (#100007166)	Roughly bounded by Thomas Rd. to Fairmont Ave. between 19th to 23rd Aves. and north side of Campus Dr. between 23rd and 24th Aves. 33°29′11″N 112°06′19″W		
222	J. T. Whitney Funeral Home	J. T. Whitney Funeral Home	September 4, 1985 (#85002079)	330 N. 2nd Ave. 33°27′09″N 112°04′33″W		
223	John G. Whittier School	John G. Whittier School	August 12, 1993 (#93000741)	2004 N. 16th St. 33°28′12″N 112°02′50″W		
224	Willo Historic District	Willo Historic District	January 9, 1991 (#90002099)	Roughly bounded by Central Ave., McDowell Rd., 7th Ave., and Thomas Rd.; also roughly bounded by Edgemont and Cambridge Rds. and 7th and 3rd Aves. 33°28′23″N 112°04′42″W		The Conn and Candlin CPA Office is located at 2701 N. 7th Ave. The building is considered historical by the Phoenix Historic Preservation Office. Second set of addresses represents a boundary increase.
225	Dudley and Hope Windes Farmstead		February 12, 2024 (#100009923)	8841 S. 27th Avenue; 33°21′55″N 112°07′03″W		
226	Windsor Square Historic District	Windsor Square Historic District	December 13, 2000 (#00001499)	Roughly bounded by 7th St., Camelback Rd., Central St., and Oregon Ave. 33°30′44″N 112°04′05″W		
227	Woodland Historic District	Woodland Historic District	July 10, 1992 (#92000839)	Roughly bounded by Van Buren St., 7th Ave., Adams St., and 15th Ave. 33°27′01″N 112°05′11″W		
228	Woodlea Historic District	Woodlea Historic District	June 10, 2010 (#10000329)	Roughly bounded by Glenrosa Ave. and Mackenzie Dr. on the north and south, and 9th Ave. on the east and west 33°29′51″N 112°05′05″W		Residential neighborhood developed between 1928 and 1949 including a range of architectural styles from bungalow to ranch
229	Wranglers Roost	Wranglers Roost	August 31, 2022 (#100008046)	2500 West New River Rd. 33°55′23″N 112°06′48″W		
230	David and Gladys Wright House	David and Gladys Wright House	January 28, 2022 (#100007156)	405 North Rubicon Ave. 33°30′05″N 111°58′10″W		
231	William Wrigley, Jr., Winter Cottage	William Wrigley, Jr., Winter Cottage	August 16, 1989 (#89001045)	2501 E. Telawa Trail; 33°31′22″N 112°01′34″W		
232	Yaple Park Historic District	Yaple Park Historic District	June 10, 2010 (#10000330)	Roughly bounded by 3rd and 7th Aves. and Turney and Minnezona Aves. 33°30′06″N 112°04′49″W		
233	Yaun Ah Gim Groceries	Yaun Ah Gim Groceries	July 8, 1986 (#86001553)	1002 S. 4th Ave. 33°26′16″N 112°04′44″W		The building is in a state of abandonment.

== Former listings ==
	Name on the Register	Image	Date listed	Date removed	Location	City or town	Description
1	Arizona Citrus Growers Association Warehouse		September 4, 1985 (#85002043)	April 6, 2015	601 E. Jackson; 33°26′41″N 112°03′54″W		Demolished
2	Arizona Orange Association Packing House		September 4, 1985 (#85002045)	April 8, 1988	520 W. Jackson; 33°26′43″N 112°04′53″W		
3	Clinton Campbell House	Clinton Campbell House	January 12, 1995 (#94001526)	April 6, 2015	361 N. 4th Ave. 33°27′12″N 112°04′41″W		demolished in 2017; built in 1875
4	Central Wholesale Terminal		September 4, 1985 (#85002050)	October 13, 1992	315 E. Madison & 227 S. 3rd St.		Demolished to build the America West Arena
5	C. W. Cisney House	C. W. Cisney House	January 12, 1995 (#94001527)	September 8, 2015	2011 W. Madison St. 33°26′41″N 112°06′07″W		
6	Coca Cola Bottling Works		September 4, 1985 (#85002053)	April 8, 1988	547 W. Jefferson; 33°26′49″N 112°04′51″W		Demolished in June, 1986.
7	Concrete Block House		November 30, 1983 (#83003457)	April 6, 2015	618-620 N. 4th Ave. 33°27′19″N 112°04′42″W		Demolished
8	Ellingson Building		September 4, 1985 (#85002055)	April 8, 1988	19 E. Washington		Disassembled to be relocated to Heritage Park, but was never reconstructed.
9	High Class Food Company		September 4, 1985 (#85002060)	October 13, 1992	1410 E. Washington		
10	Higuera Grocery		October 1, 1985 (#85002893)	April 6, 2015	923 S. 2nd Ave. 33°26′17″N 112°04′30″W		Demolished
11	Hotel St. James	Hotel St. James	September 4, 1985 (#85002061)	April 6, 2015	21 E. Madison; 33°26′45″N 112°04′21″W		Front façade and lobby still remain, but most of building was demolished in October 2012 for valet parking at America West Arena.
12	Kaler House	Kaler House	December 17, 1992 (#92001686)	June 17, 2019	301 W. Frier Dr. 33°32′56″N 112°04′40″W	Alhambra	
13	Lightning Delivery Co. Warehouse		September 4, 1985 (#85002064)	April 6, 2015	425 E. Jackson; 33°26′41″N 112°04′01″W		Demolished
14	Medical Arts Building		1987 (#87001883)	October 13, 1992	545 E. McDowell Road; 33°27′54″N 112°03′56″W		
15	Overland Arizona Co.		October 1, 1985 (#85002896)	April 6, 2015	12 N. 4th Ave. 33°26′54″N 112°04′43″W		Demolished
16	Rose Tourist Camp		September 4, 1985 (#85002072)	October 13, 1992	1555 W. Van Buren; 33°27′00″N 112°05′41″W		
17	Steinegger Lodging House	Steinegger Lodging House	June 19, 1986 (#86001369)	September 8, 2020	27 E. Monroe; 33°27′00″N 112°04′20″W		
18	Judge W. H. Stillwell House		January 12, 1995 (#94001537)	April 6, 2015	2039 W. Monroe St. 33°27′00″N 112°06′09″W		Demolished
19	West End Hotel		October 1, 1985 (#85002897)	May 2, 2006	701 W. Washington; 33°26′52″N 112°04′58″W		
20	Winters Building-Craig Building		September 4, 1985 (#85002080)	April 8, 1988	39 W. Adams; 33°27′00″N 112°05′41″W		

== See also ==
- National Register of Historic Places listings in Maricopa County, Arizona
- List of National Historic Landmarks in Arizona
- National Register of Historic Places listings in Arizona
