= Ruban =

Ruban may refer to:

- Rúbaň, a village and municipality in Slovakia
- Ruban (surname)
- Ruban Jaune, (English; Yellow Ribbon) a cycling trophy
- Ruban Nielson, New Zealand musician
- Rubanisation, a concept of human settlements, where city and countryside are considered one space.
- A ribbon controller (French)

== See also ==
- Ruben (disambiguation)
