= Urban village =

Decentralized urban development

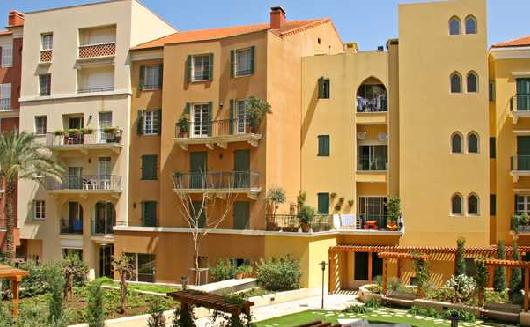
The main square of Saifi Village in Beirut Central District in Beirut, Lebanon

In urban planning and design, an urban village is an urban development typically characterized by medium-density housing, mixed use zoning, good public transit and an emphasis on pedestrianization and public space. Contemporary urban village ideas are closely related to New Urbanism and smart growth ideas initiated in the United States.

Urban villages are seen to provide an alternative to recent patterns of urban development in many cities, especially decentralization and urban sprawl. They are generally purported to:

- Reduce car reliance and promote cycling, walking and transit use
- Provide a high level of self-containment (people working, recreating and living in the same area)
- Help facilitate strong community institutions and interaction

The concept of urban villages was formally born in Britain in the late 1980s with the establishment of the Urban Villages Group (UVG). Following pressure from the UVG, the concept was prioritized in British national planning policy between 1997 and 1999. Urban villages also come in the form of suburbs of metropolitan areas that are politically designated as villages.

== Application ==
Urban village ideals have been applied to new greenfield and brownfield developments and urban renewal projects. The concept has been widely adopted in many countries and used by both government development agencies as well as private enterprise as a guiding concept for many projects.

== Influences and impetus ==
The ideas of the urban commentator Jane Jacobs are widely regarded as having had the largest influence on the urban village concept. Jacobs rejected the modernist views that dominated urban planning and architecture in the 1950s–60s and constructed an alternative philosophy that values traditional neighborhoods and the role of the inner city. Proponents believe that urban villages provide a viable alternative to the social ills that characterize modernism in cities, such as freeways and high-rise estates.

Another strong impetus for urban villages has been growing disenchantment with the urban sprawl that has characterized the development of many cities since World War II. Urban villages are seen to create self-contained communities that reduce the need to travel large distances and reduce the subsequent reliance on the automobile. The decline of noxious industry and the emergence of the service economy allows the mixing of employment and residential activities without detriment to residents. This is in contrast to the single-use zoning that helped fuel urban sprawl during the industrial and manufacturing eras. Through more consolidated development, urban villages can reduce the intrusion of urban growth on the countryside. These environmental consequences of urban sprawl have come to dominate discussion promoting urban villages in recent years.

Urban villages are widely seen to provide a solution to the demise of community that is often associated with modernism and sprawl. The concept uses the social and physical morphology of the traditional rural village as an inspiration for creating better functioning communities. The urban village movement has been influenced by Ebenezer Howard’s Garden City ideals which also emphasize environmental determinism in relation to community. Urban design techniques such as public space and pedestrianization are employed to facilitate the development of community by encouraging human interaction. This philosophy shares many attributes with the new urbanism school of thought.

== Criticisms ==
Many urban village developments, both Government and privately initiated, have been seen to depart from the original ideals of the concept. Private developments often use the "urban village" label as an advertising pitch or to win Government support for their project. Many developments, although intended to create a true urban village form, have not achieved their objectives. Some planners question whether a genuine urban village has actually been built.

The objectives of urban villages are often criticized as unrealistic because they ignore broader social and economic realities. The ability to create self-contained villages is questionable as employment and activity patterns continue to become more complex. The viability of creating a variety of employment and activity within an area with a small population base can also be questioned. It has been suggested that the demise of the neighborhood community is a function of "conscious economic and social choice" rather than a product of urban form.

The limitations of the urban village concept to achieve sustainability in urban areas have also been studied in developing countries, which further emphasizes the institutional barriers against such an application in the case of the developing countries. This issue becomes more critical when we accept that the institutional landscape in rural environments is more complex than urban areas and that incompatible institutional structure of the developing countries would add to the idealistic nature of the urban village concept.

Some urban commentators believe that urban villages are not a new concept and are simply a re-formulation of ideas that have been prevalent in urban planning for decades.

== Examples ==
The following is a brief list of a few projects claimed to be urban villages that have evolved or already been completed, or are in planning stages:

=== Asia ===
- Saifi Village in Centre Ville, Beirut, Lebanon

=== Europe ===
- Adamstown, Dublin, Ireland
- Coed Darcy, Wales, United Kingdom
- Canal Street and the surrounding areas that make up Manchester Gay Village, Manchester, England, United Kingdom
- Holbeck Urban Village, Leeds, England, United Kingdom
- Poundbury, Dorset, England, United Kingdom
- Fairford Leys, Aylesbury, Buckinghamshire, England, United Kingdom
- Greenwich Millennium Village, London, England, United Kingdom

=== North America ===
- Westboro Village, Ottawa, Ontario, Canada
- Commercial Drive, Vancouver, British Columbia, Canada
- Parkside Village in Mississauga, Ontario, Canada
- Osborne Village in Winnipeg, Manitoba, Canada
- Willowgrove and Rosewood, Saskatoon, Canada (Planned communities based on the urban village concept)
- Metro Walk, Richmond, California, United States
- Franklin, Michigan, United States
- Bensenville, Illinois, United States
- Ballston, Clarendon, Court House, Crystal City, Pentagon City, Rosslyn, Shirlington, and Virginia Square, in Arlington County, Virginia, United States
- Santana Row in San Jose, California, United States
- Bayshore Town Center in Whitefish Bay, Wisconsin, United States
- Corners of Brookfield, Wisconsin, United States
- Ahwatukee Foothills, Alhambra, Camelback East, Central City, Deer Valley, Desert View, Encanto, Estrella, Laveen, Maryvale, North Gateway, North Mountain, Paradise Valley, Rio Vista, and South Mountain, all of which border each other in Phoenix, Arizona, United States
- Central Village, East Village, and South Village in Sandy, Utah, United States (master-planned villages under development)

=== Oceania ===
- Bulimba & Hawthorne, Brisbane, Queensland, Australia
- Kelvin Grove, Brisbane, Queensland, Australia
- Doncaster Hill, Melbourne, Victoria, Australia

== See also ==
- 15-minute city
- New Urbanism
- Peri Urban Regions Platform Europe
- Principles of Intelligent Urbanism
- Rubanisation
- Transit oriented development
- Urban planning
- Urban sprawl

=== Suburbs classified as villages ===
- Bensenville, Illinois, a suburb of Chicago
- Franklin, Michigan, a suburb of Detroit
- Lathrup Village, Michigan, a suburb of Detroit
- Ottawa Hills, Ohio, a suburb of Toledo
