= Ashland Place Historic District =

Ashland Place Historic District may refer to:

- Ashland Place Historic District (Mobile, Alabama), listed on the NRHP in Alabama
- Ashland Place Historic District (Phoenix, Arizona), listed on the NRHP in Maricopa County, Arizona
