= Rubanov =

Rubanov, feminine: Rubanova is a Russian surname. Notable people with the surname include:

- Andrey Rubanov (born 1969), Russian writer and journalist
- Fedir Rubanov, Ukrainian politician
- Irina Rubanova (1933–2024), Soviet and Russian film scholar and critic
- Natalya Rubanova, Russian writer and literary editor
- Roman Rubanov, Russian politician
- Vladimir Rubanov, Soviet and Russian statesman

== See also ==
- Ruban (surname)
