= Doncaster Hill =

Hill in Melbourne, Australia

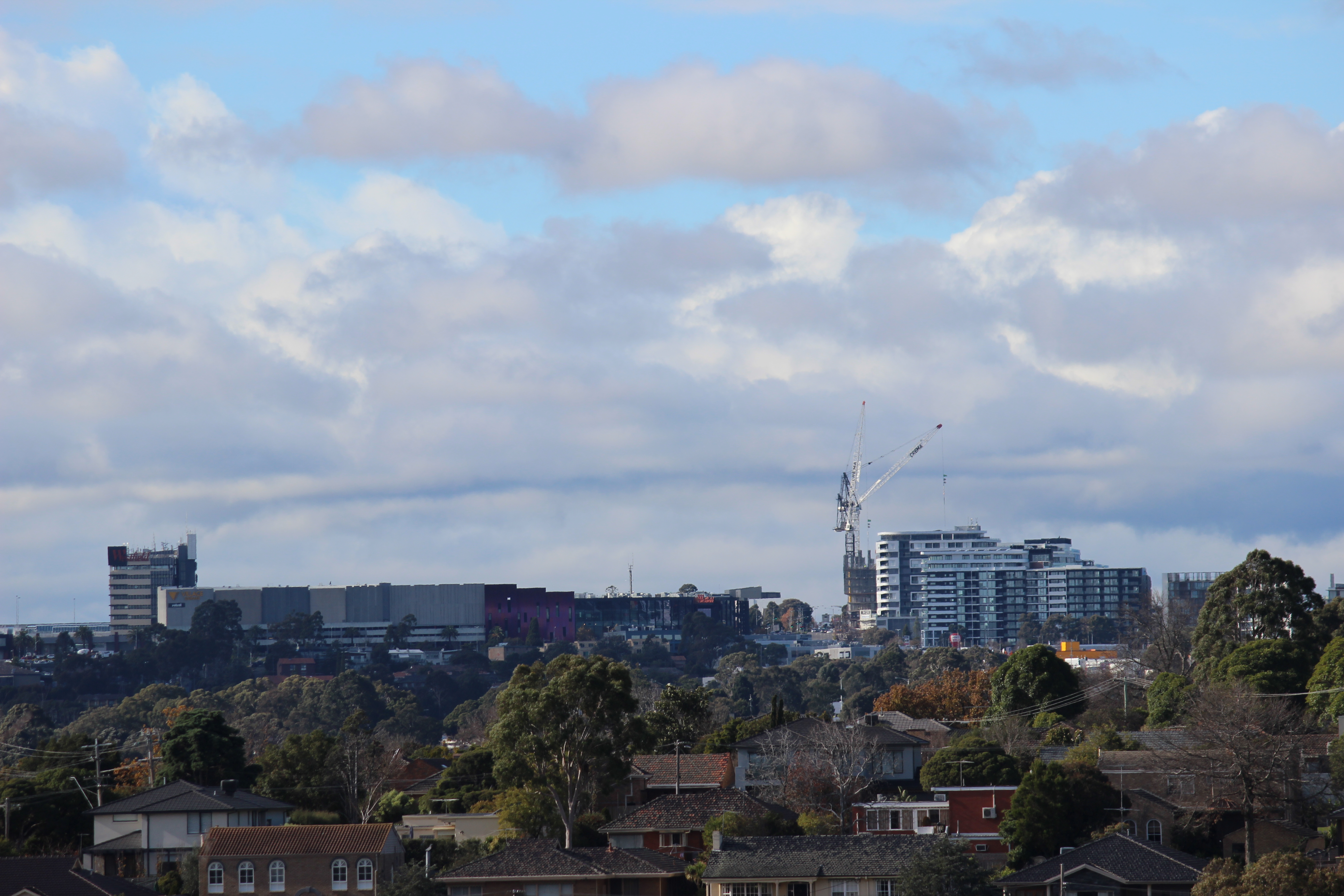
- Eastern side of Doncaster Hill viewed from North Balwyn in July 2017

Highest point
- Elevation: 120 m (390 ft)AHD
- Prominence: Low
- Coordinates: 37.78643406070694°S 145.1311650714751°E

Geography
- Location: Victoria, Australia

Climbing
- Easiest route: Car, Bus (sealed road)

Doncaster Hill is one of the highest points in the metropolitan area of Melbourne, Victoria, Australia. It is in the suburb of Doncaster, it is 120 metres above sea level and has uninterrupted views of the city, Port Phillip, Macedon Ranges, the You Yang Ranges and Dandenong Ranges. The hill experienced extensive low-density urban development during the 1960s and 70s, consisting of typical detached suburban dwellings.

The surrounding transport infrastructure is heavily reliant on private automobiles. The City of Manningham has enacted policies to encourage high-density development atop the hill, however it lacks a holistic policy and incentives scheme to properly encourage sustainable urban development and transit-oriented development. As a result, the housing available is generally marketed to higher income earners and are of low practical quality.

== Government planning strategies ==
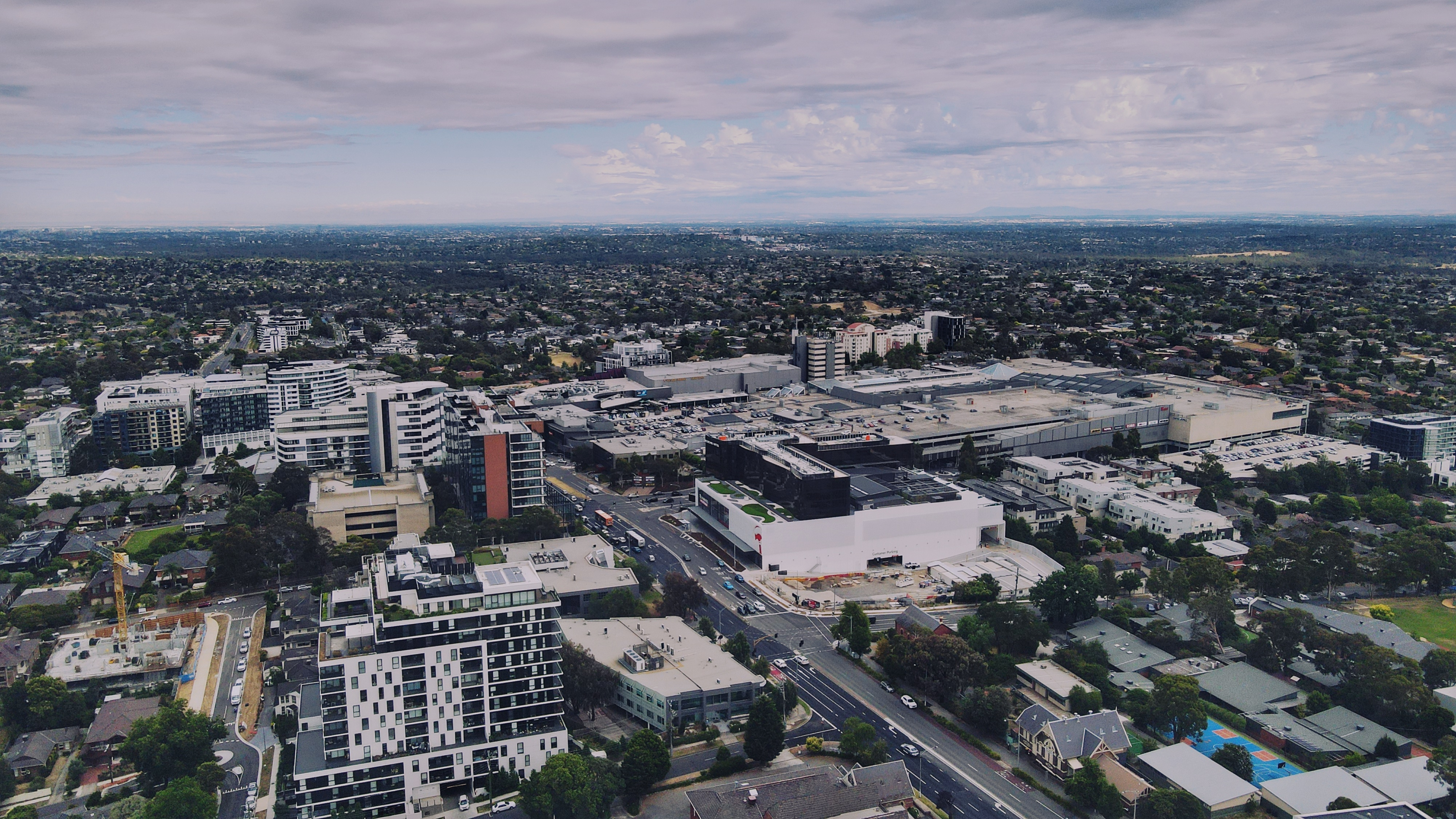
Doncaster Hill in January 2022

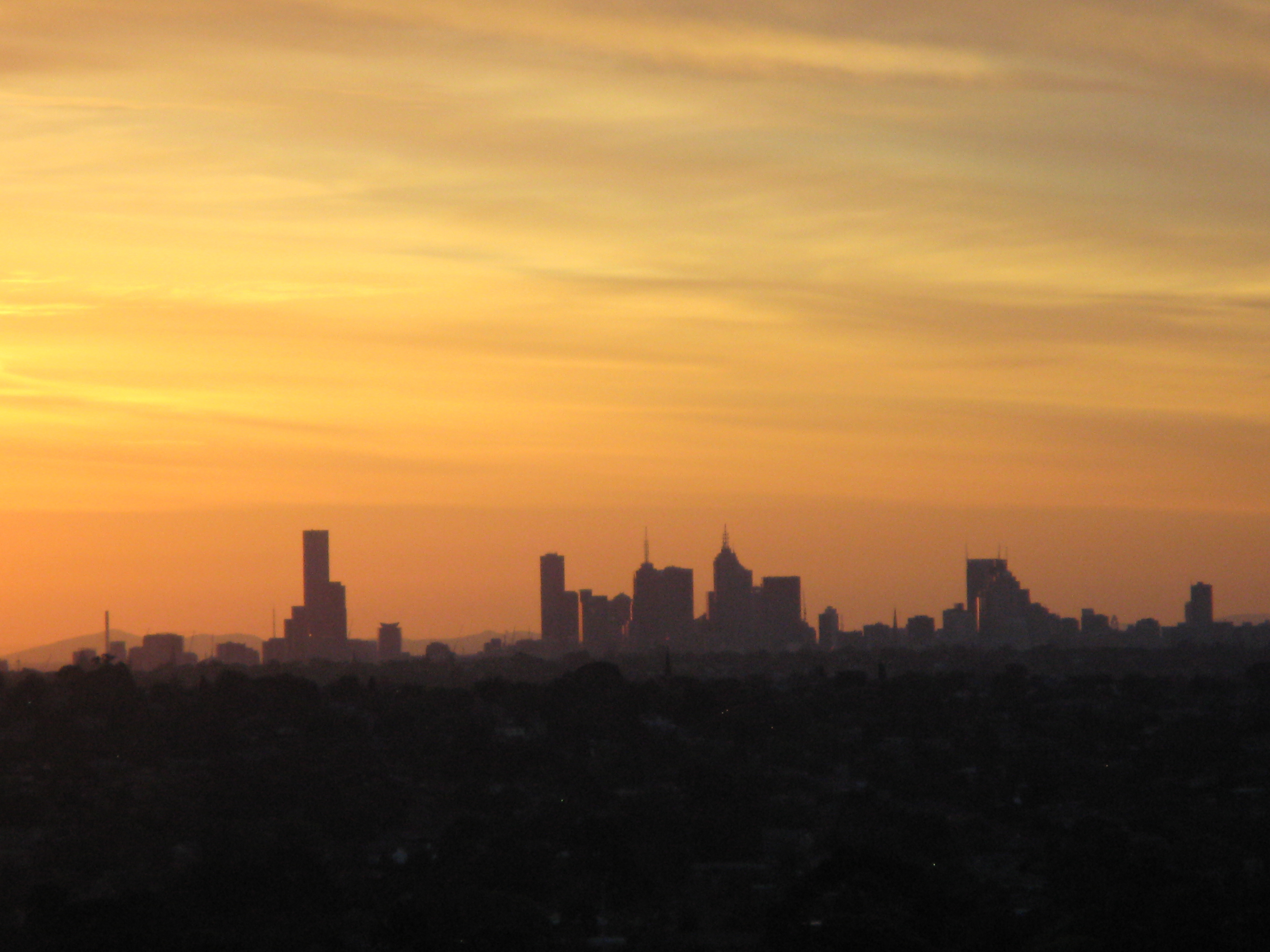
Central Melbourne as seen from atop Doncaster Hill

The Doncaster Hill Precinct strategy is a 20-year, A$2 billion proposal created by the City of Manningham for the area. The 58-hectare (140-acre) precinct identified by the strategy is located 12 kilometres (7.5 mi) from Melbourne's central business district. It is situated close to main arterial roads, including the Eastern Freeway, but is poorly served by public transport, with access to only buses.

The strategy aims to create an urban village which reduces urban sprawl that would otherwise place pressure on natural environments in the green wedges to the precinct's east. The proposal includes both residential and commercial developments. Streetscapes, parks, transport and planning schemes are all being improved and amended as part of the proposal.

Previous developments in the area include the Westfield Doncaster shopping centre, built in 1970 on a site previously occupied by a grocer shop as well as a few medium-density residential buildings. A few projects have already begun on Doncaster Hill, which has so far been limited to residential towers and flats that are built to take advantage of the views. In spite of expensive council promotion, investors are shying away from committing to a proposal that does not include upgraded public transport and parking requirements as well as the difficult topography. The Hill Strategy does not comply with the ideals of the State Planning Department because of its inability to provide walking and bicycling paths.

Some investors want to undertake developments like that of Council House 2 in Melbourne's CBD and argue that the Manningham City council's proposal for the Doncaster Hill precinct is dated and should focus more on sustainability to entice investors.

=== Eastern Golf Club ===
Slightly down the hill towards the city is the Eastern Golf Club, a golf course which has been proposed to be sold. Although three preservation groups advocate rezoning the land to prevent any redevelopment, if the sale goes through, it could be used to construct a medium-density sustainable urban precinct treating its own waste, collecting its own water and generating its own electricity. Many suggest coupling this potential sustainable land development with the Doncaster Hill precinct to create one of the largest car-free areas in the world in an existing urban environment. However, this is unlikely as it would require large political support.

The group Retain Eastern At Doncaster (READ) attempted to present the alternative to relocation which would keep The Eastern Golf Club in its location at Doncaster. Neighbourhood gatherings to show support to the members were held, local government and expert consultation was made and support gained especially from Manningham City Council, MP Mary Wooldridge and Councillors. Provision for water was explored and planned for—water was the significant resource needed to build a sustainable future for the club. As of 2011 the club's land has been sold to Mirvac.

For information regarding the alternative to relocation, also discussion & support messages. http://easternsupport.bravehost.com/index.html

=== Doncaster Tower Reconstruction ===
Many local residents and historical societies have suggested constructing a replica of the original Doncaster Tower atop Doncaster Hill. The proposal suggests it be constructed of reinforced concrete clad in timber to replicate the original construction. This would provide another man-made drawcard to the area, providing 360-degree views of Melbourne and its surrounding environment as well as increased telecommunication installation opportunities.

== Precincts ==
There are seven proposed precincts in the Doncaster Hill planning strategy. Five of the precincts are residential, one is retail and the other is for civic purposes.

=== Precinct 1 ===
Precinct 1, or the Civic Precinct, covers the non-residential area off Doncaster Road, near the municipal offices.
