= Ruban (surname) =

Ruban (Ukrainian: Рубан) is a Ukrainian gender-neutral surname associated with the Ukrainian noble Ruban family. It may refer to the following notable people:

- Stanislav Ruban (born 1996), Russian and Ukrainian football player
- Svetlana Ruban (born 1965), Uzbek track and field athlete
- Viktor Ruban (born 1981), Ukrainian archer
- Yelyzaveta Ruban (born 1995), Azerbaijani volleyball player

== See also ==
- Rubanov
