= Alhambra, Phoenix =

Urban village of Phoenix, Arizona

Alhambra
- Urban village
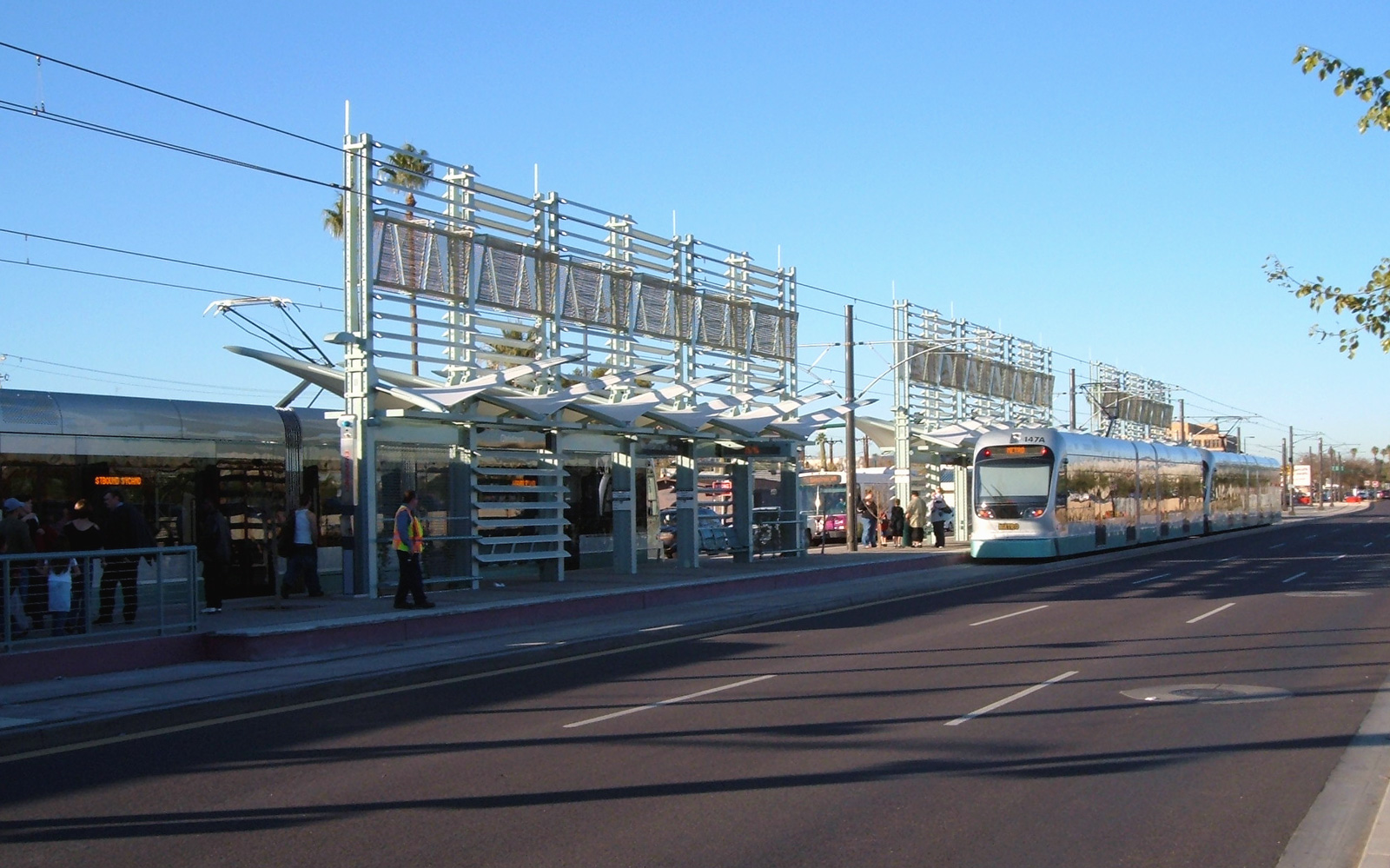
- Valley Metro Rail Station in Alhambra.

- Location within Arizona Location within the United States
- Coordinates: 33.49833°N 112.13361°W
- Country: United States
- State: Arizona
- County: Maricopa
- City: Phoenix

Area
  - Total: 20 sq mi (52 km^{2})

Population (2010)
  - Total: 127,764
  - Density: 6,400/sq mi (2,500/km^{2})
- Website: Alhambra Village Planning Committee

Alhambra is an urban village of Phoenix, Arizona.

== Location ==
Alhambra encompasses an area south of Northern Avenue, west of 7th Street, east of 43rd Avenue, and north of Grand Avenue or the Grand Canal.

Location of Alhambra highlighted in red

== History ==
The community's name was chosen by William John Murphy (1839–1923) to designate one of the four North Phoenix areas he sub-divided. It was built principally to satisfy the housing needs of a growing population in the aftermath of World War II. Many of those who moved to the area discovered it when they were stationed at Luke Air Force Base.

== Demographics ==
As of 2010, Alhambra had a population of 127,764 living in an area of roughly 20 square miles, giving a density of about 6,400/square mile. 61.1% of residents were white, 6.6% were black or African American, 3.4% were American Indian or Alaska Native, and 4.1% were Asian or Pacific Islander. 21% of residents were some other race, and 3.9% were persons of two or more races.

== Crime ==
In September of 2024, Varsha Patel, the owner of The Royal Inn Hotel was arrested for receiving kickbacks from drugs and prostitution operations occurring within the hotel. The Royal Inn was seized and shut down by the FBI.

== See also ==
- Christown Spectrum Mall
- Grand Canyon University
