= Ellis-Shackelford House =

Historic house in Phoenix, Arizona

- U.S. National Register of Historic Places
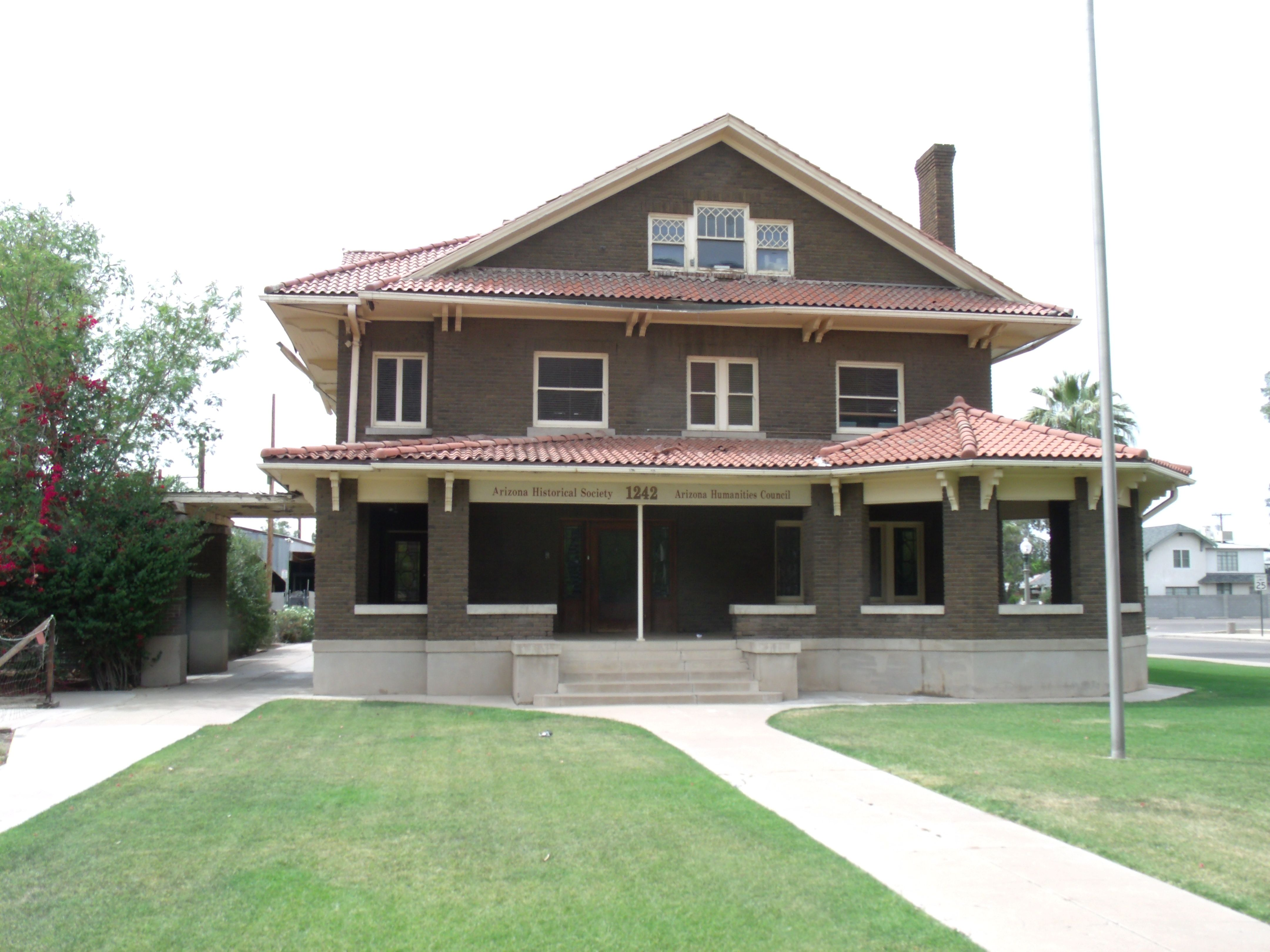

- Location within Arizona
- Interactive map showing the location of Ellis-Shackleford House
- Location: 1242 N. Central Ave., Phoenix, Arizona
- Coordinates: 33°27′44″N 112°05′02″W
- Area: less than one acre
- Built: 1917
- Built by: Tom Weatherford
- Architect: R.A. Gray
- Architectural style: Bungalow/craftsman
- MPS: Roosevelt Neighborhood MRA
- NRHP reference No.: 83003475
- Added to NRHP: November 30, 1983

The Ellis-Shackelford House, also known during its history as the Dr. Ellis House and the Central Arizona Museum, is located at 1242 N. Central Ave. in Phoenix, Arizona. The house is in the Central Avenue Corridor's Billionaire's Row. It is listed on the National Register of Historic Places and is one of the remaining unaltered North Central Avenue mansions.

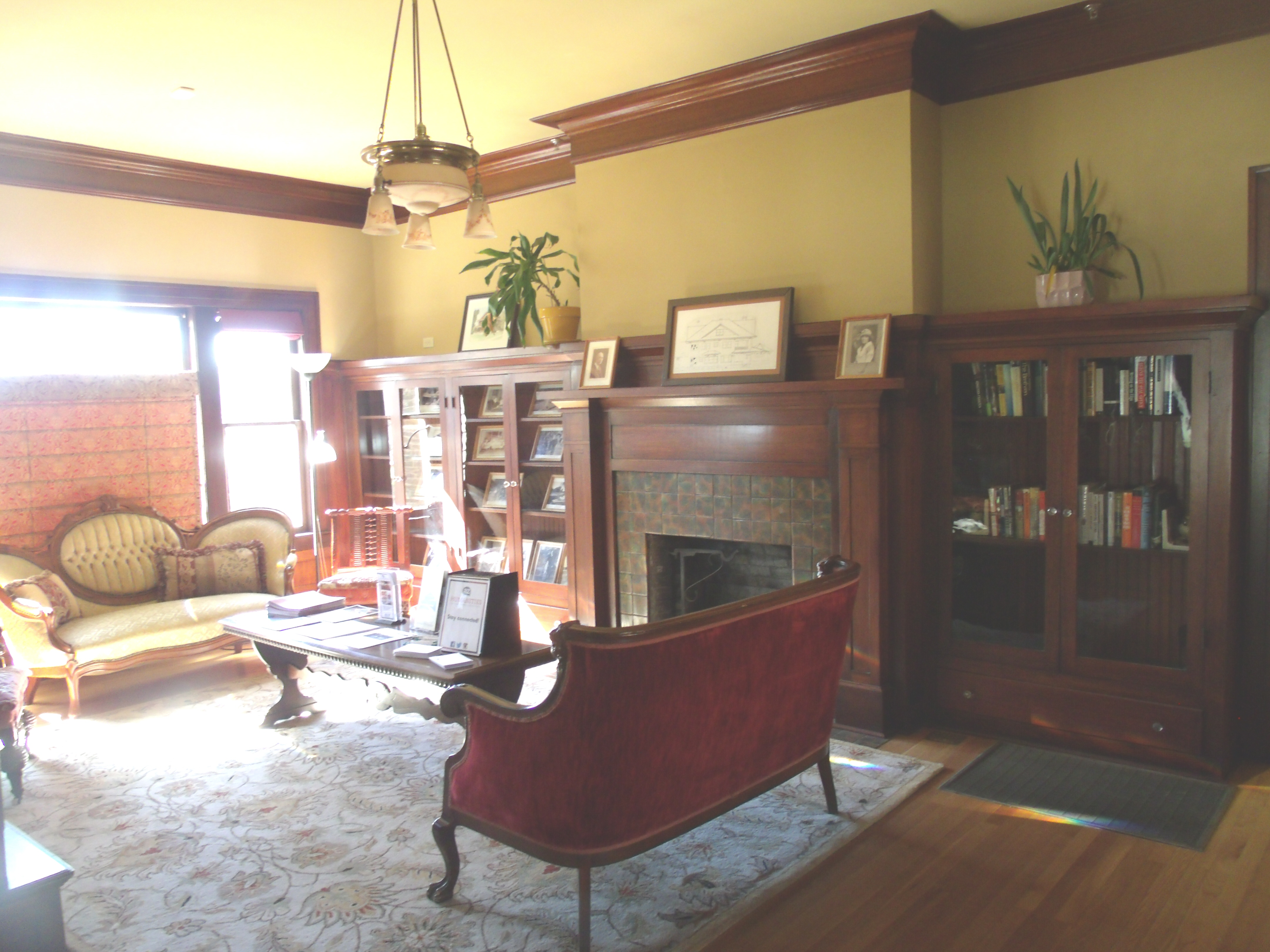
The living room of the Ellis-Shackelford House. The house was built in 1917 and is located in 1242 N. Central Ave. On November 30, 1983, the house was listed in the National Register of Historic Places, ref.: #83003475.

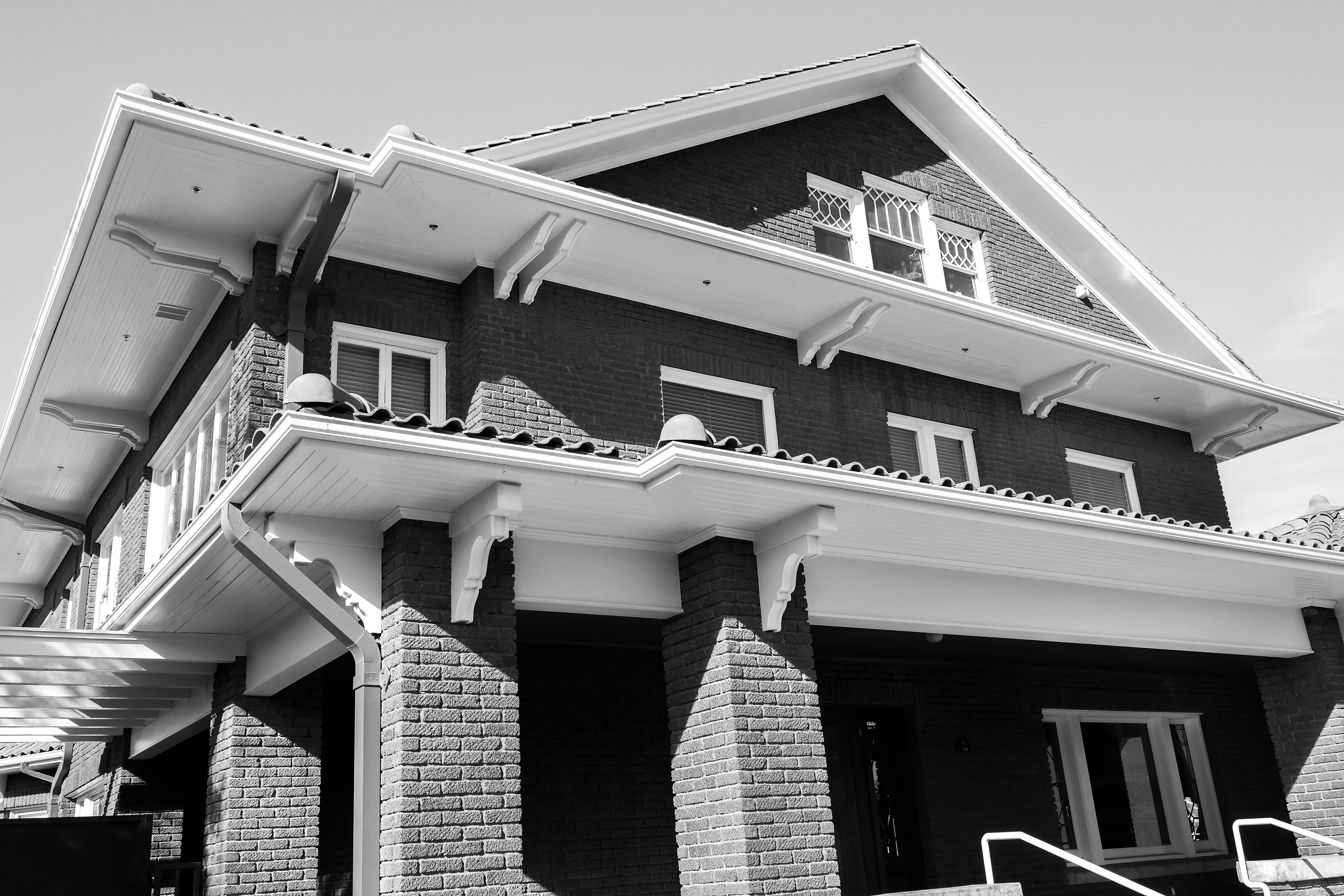
detail

The house was built in a bungalow/craftsman style 1917 and designed by architect R.A. Gray, who is best known for having designed St. Mary's Church, and was built by contractor Tom Weatherford.

It was listed as part of a study of historic resources in the Roosevelt neighborhood which compared the popularity of the Spanish Colonial Revival style with that of the Craftsman Bungalow.

William Ellis moved to Phoenix from Ohio in 1907 and worked as Chief of the Medical Staff of what was then Arizona Deaconess Hospital. He had the house built about a mile from his offices for Reba, his second wife, and his daughter Helen. Ellis's daughter and her husband, J. Gordon Shackelford, for whom the house is also named, called the house home until 1964 and Shackelford added a dentist's office to the property in 1947. Subsequently, the property became a boys' home before becoming home to the Arizona Historical Society and its offices and the Phoenix Trolley Museum in what was the dental office. The home underwent a nine-month renovation in 2012-2013, and as of 2024, the building is owned by the city of Phoenix and is home to Arizona Humanities, the state National Endowment for the Humanities affiliate.

In 2016, Amy Ellis Shackelford, great-great granddaughter of William Ellis, became the fourth generation in her family to celebrate a wedding at the house when she married Aaron Aguirre on March 12.

== See also ==
- Phoenix Historic Property Register
