= Camelback East, Phoenix =

Coordinates: 33.4917917°N 111.9880199°W

Camelback East
- Urban village of Phoenix, Arizona
- Camelback East Village
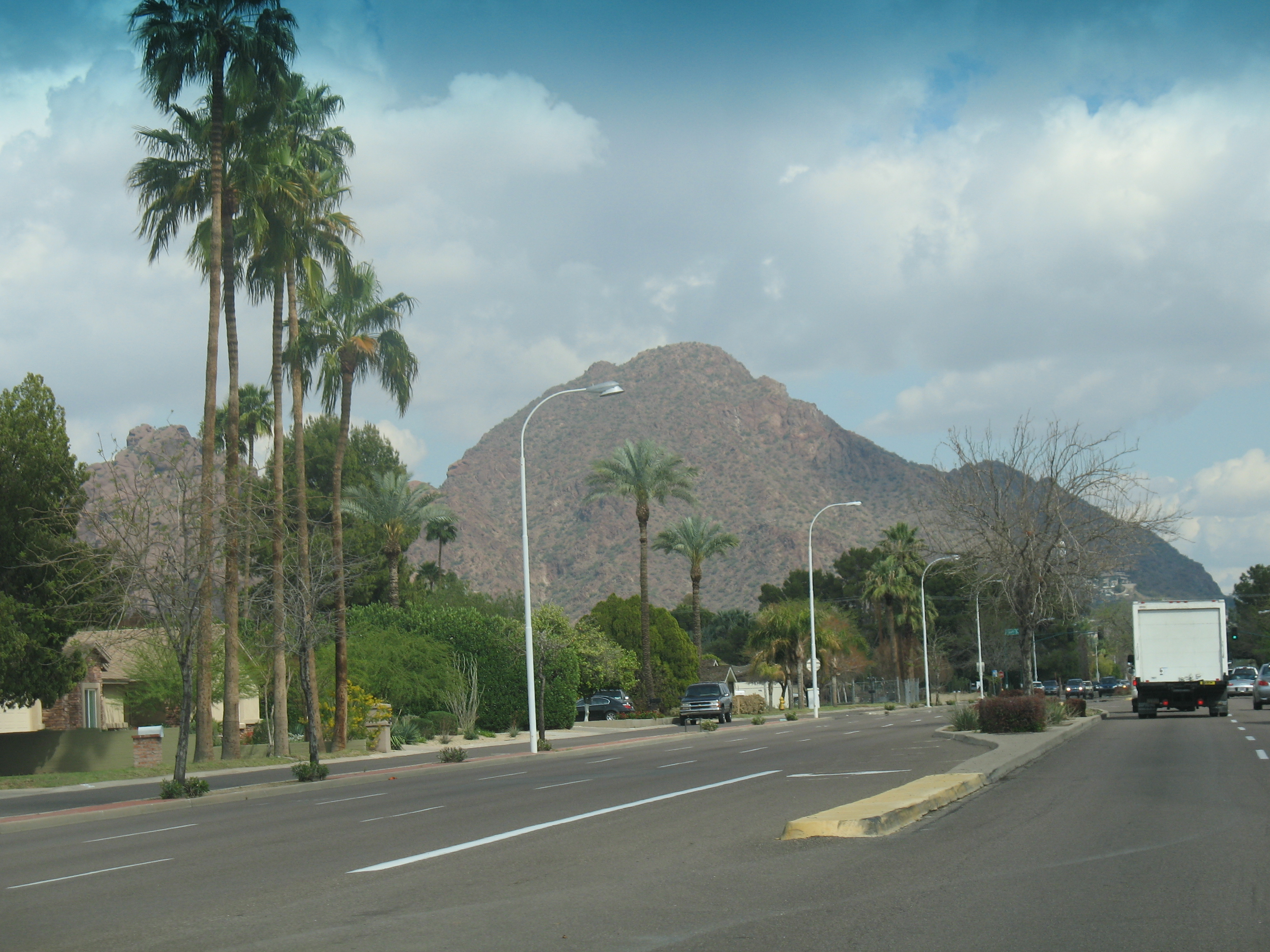
- Camelback Mountain as viewed from Camelback Road

- Location of Camelback East highlighted in red.
- Country: United States
- State: Arizona
- County: Maricopa
- City: Phoenix
- Website: Camelback East Village Planning Committee

The Camelback East Village, also sometimes referred to as East Phoenix or the East Side, is one of the 15 villages that constitutes Phoenix, Arizona, United States. It is adjacent to the suburbs Paradise Valley and Scottsdale and sits between Piestewa Peak and Camelback Mountain. There are two main cores of the village. The first is the 24th Street and Camelback Road core and the other is the 44th Street and Van Buren Street core.

Neighborhoods in Camelback east include Arcadia and the Biltmore Area.

== Retail history ==
Thomas Mall, located near Thomas Road and 40th Street, was the second indoor shopping mall built in Phoenix. Opened in 1963, it was anchored by Montgomery Ward and Diamond’s and was known for its naturally lit concourse, public art, and nine interior water features. The mall closed in 1988 and was razed in 1993.
