= Central City, Phoenix =

Coordinates: 33.435°N 112.060°W

Central City
- Urban village of Phoenix, Arizona
- Central City Village
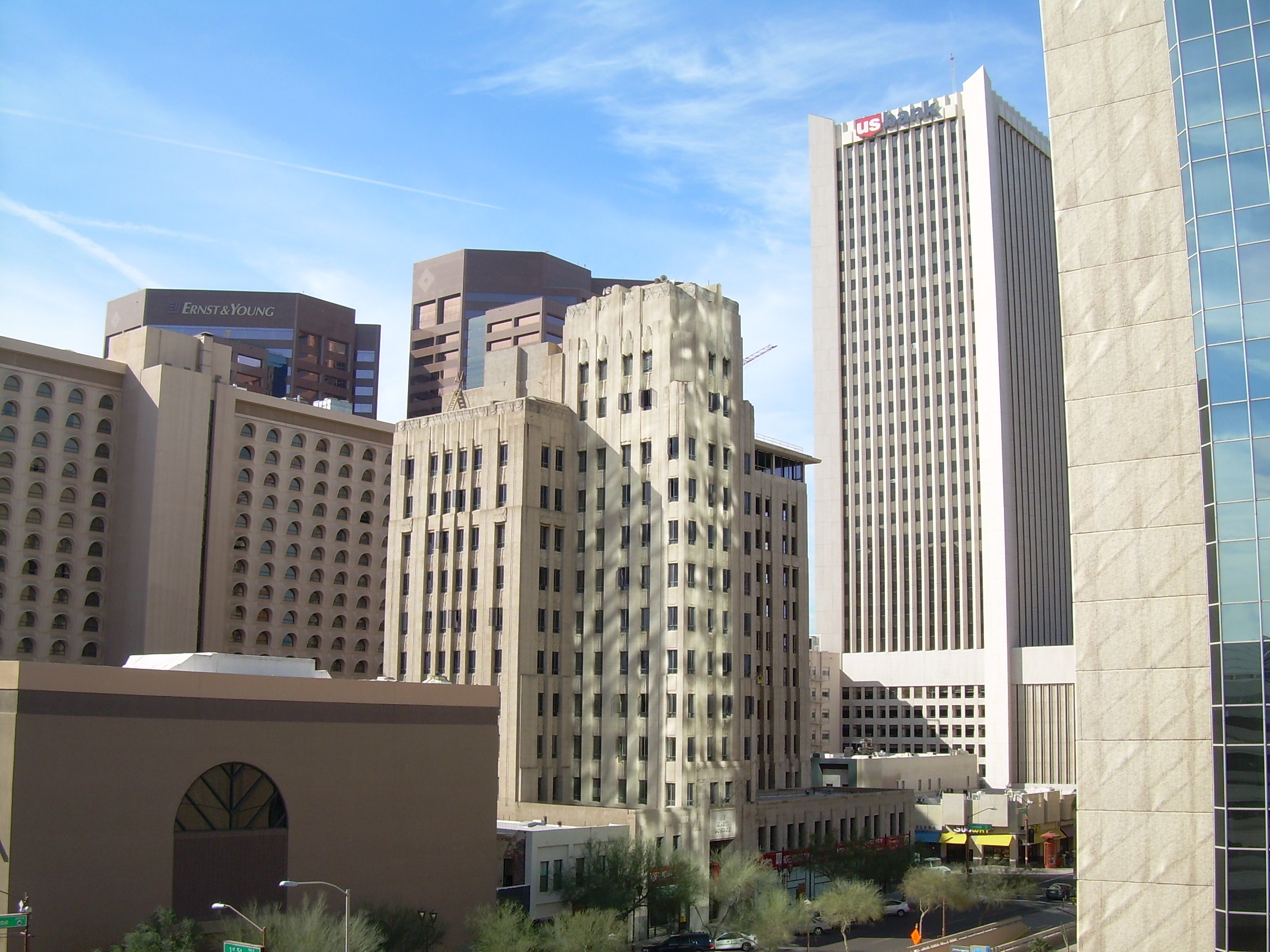
- Buildings in downtown Phoenix

- Location of Central City highlighted in red.
- Country: United States
- State: Arizona
- County: Maricopa
- City: Phoenix

Area
  - Total: 10 sq mi (26 km^{2})

Population (2010)
  - Total: 58,161
  - Density: 5,800/sq mi (2,200/km^{2})
- Website: www.phoenix.gov/pdd/pz/central-city-village-planning-committee

Central City Village is the urban village of Phoenix, Arizona, that includes the downtown area of the city. As of 2010, it had a population of 58,161 residents.

== Geography ==
As defined by the boundaries, Central City Village has an area of roughly 10 square miles. This includes not only Downtown, but the close vicinity and the Sky Harbor area directly east. The village is bounded by McDowell Road and the Grand Canal to the north and northeast, the border with Tempe to the east, the Salt River to the south, and 19th Avenue/I-17 to the west.

== Features ==
Because of its location at the historic center of Phoenix, there are many old homes and buildings located in the Central City Village that convey the history of Phoenix. Downtown, which includes the larger commercial and government buildings, as well as sports venues such as Footprint Center and Chase Field, is the core of the village and the city of Phoenix. Because of this, Central City Village is almost unique, in that it has a much more urban environment than the other, more suburban, villages of Phoenix.

The village also includes Sky Harbor International Airport, the busiest airport in Arizona and among the busiest in the nation, which provides domestic air travel, as well as international travel.

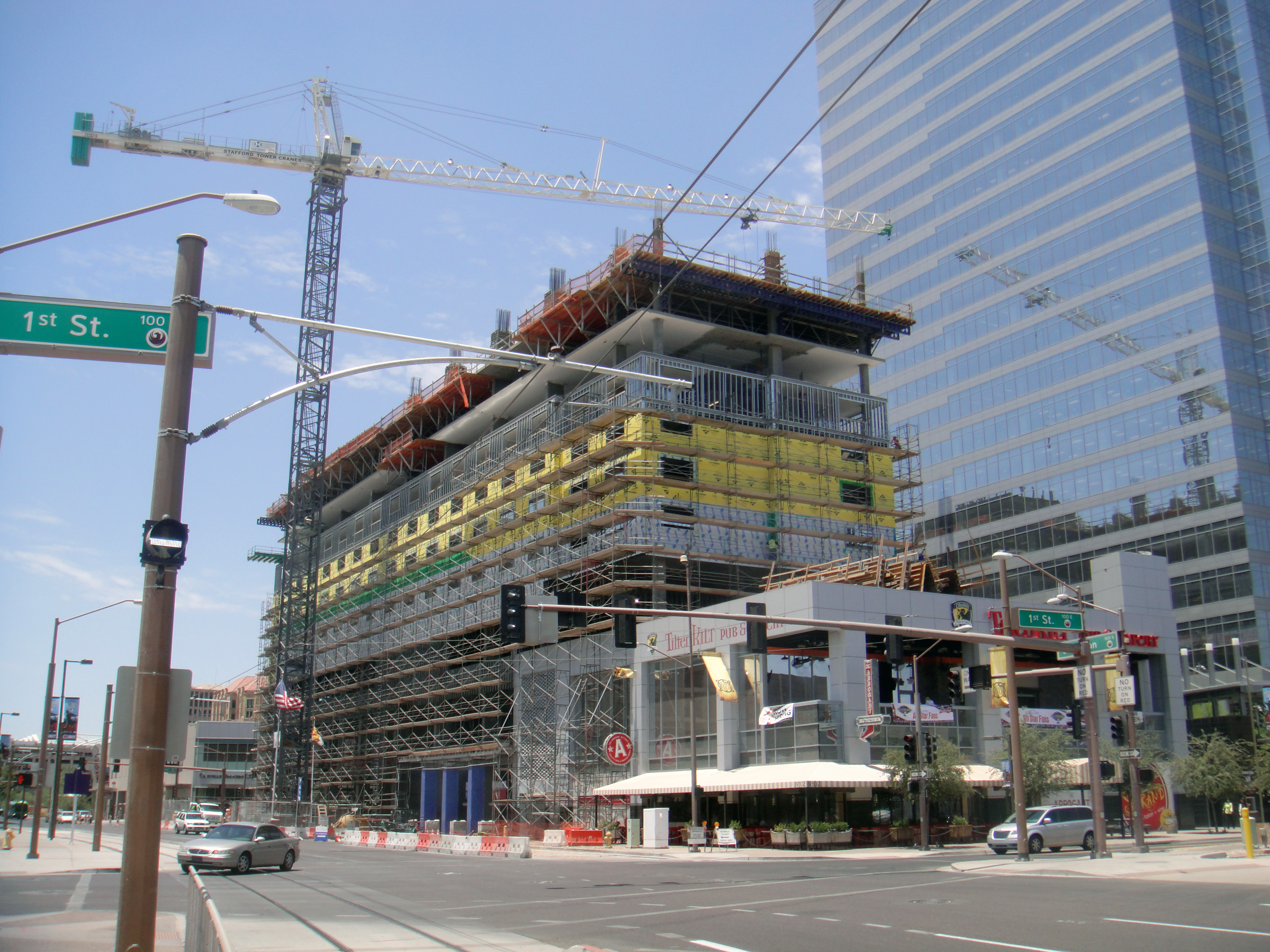
Hotel Palomar under construction in Downtown Phoenix, part of the CityScape complex

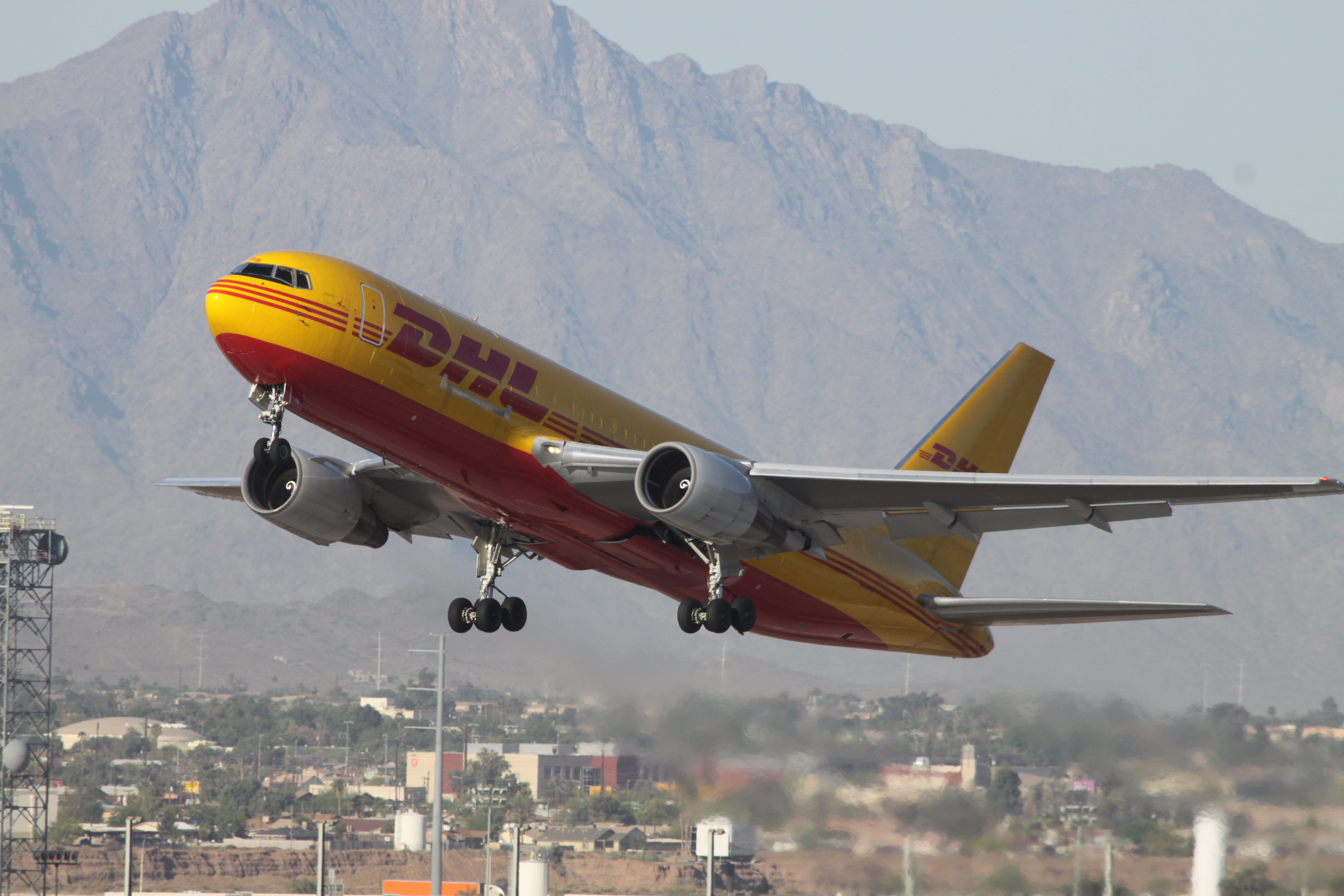
Commercial Airliner taking off from Sky Harbor in Phoenix

== See also ==
- Urban villages of Phoenix, Arizona
