= Swindall Tourist Inn =

- U.S. National Register of Historic Places
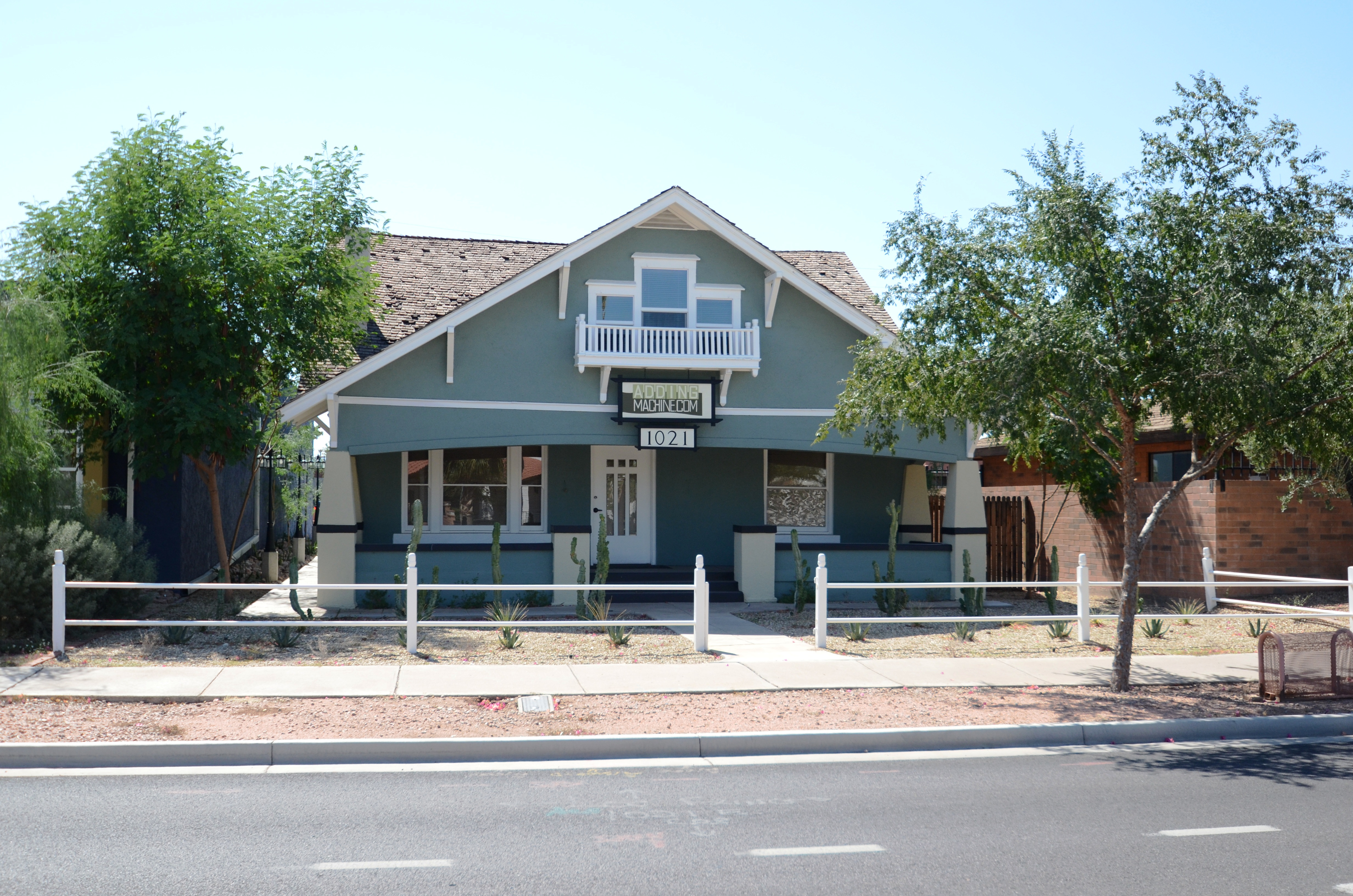

- Location within Arizona Location within the United States
- Location: 1021 E. Washington St., Phoenix, Arizona
- Coordinates: 33°26′53″N 112°3′31″W
- Area: less than one acre
- Architect: Steyaert Brothers
- Architectural style: Bungalow/American craftsman
- NRHP reference No.: 95001081
- Added to NRHP: September 7, 1995

The Swindall Tourist Inn is the last known surviving African American boarding house in Phoenix, Arizona used during the Jim Crow era. The building itself was built in 1913 and was sold in 1940. Until its selling, it was used as a boarding house, predominantly for African American lodgers. The building has since been converted to office use.
