= E. Payne Palmer House =

Historic house in Arizona, United States

- U.S. National Register of Historic Places
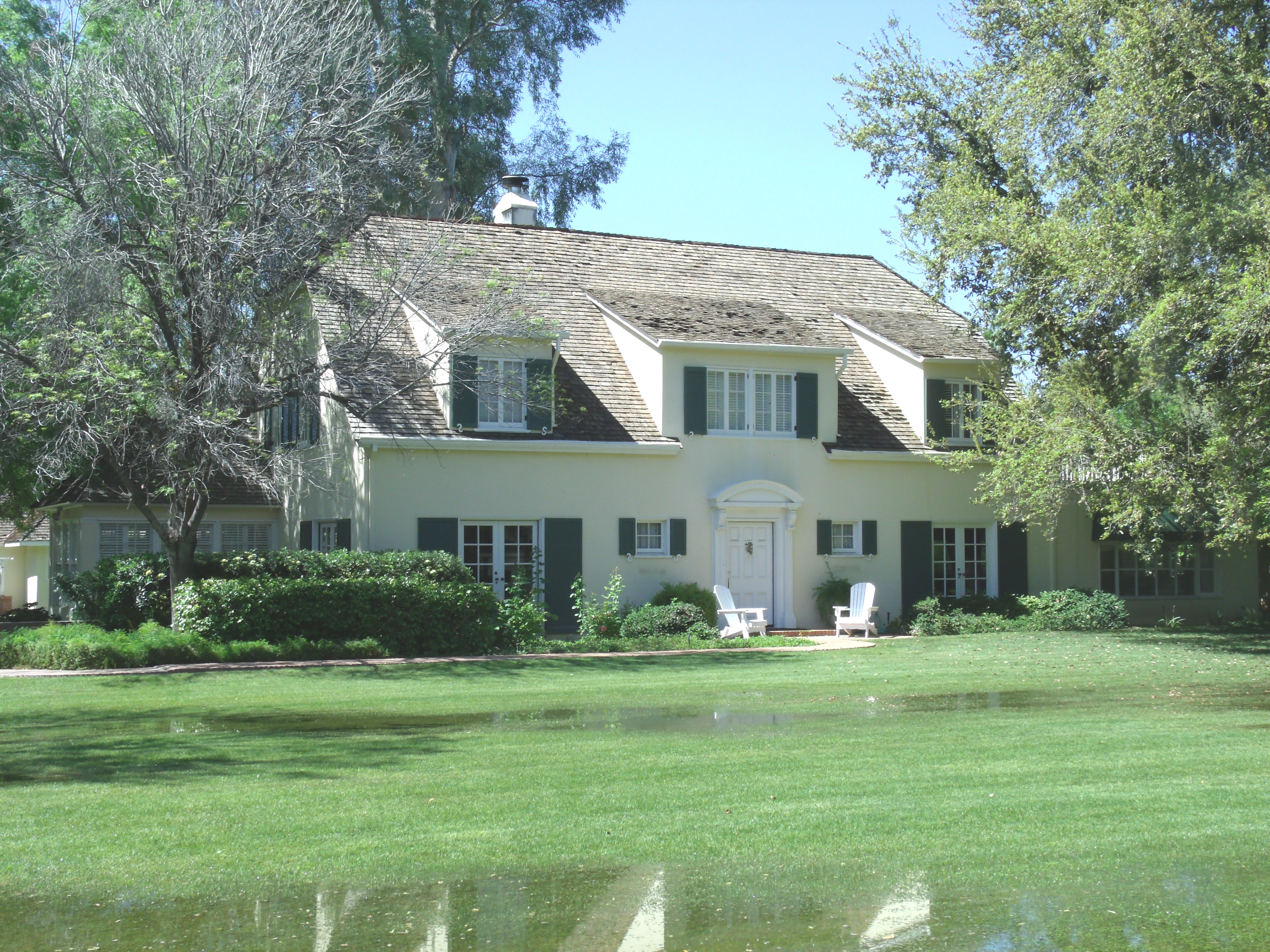

- Location within Arizona Location within the United States
- Location: Central Avenue, Phoenix, Arizona
- Coordinates: 33°31′28″N 112°04′27″W
- Built: 1925
- Architect: Gordon-Van Tine pre-cut kit house
- Architectural style: Colonial Revival
- NRHP reference No.: 02000420
- Added to NRHP: 5/2/2002

The E. Payne Palmer House is a Gordon-Van Tine "Brentwood" model of a catalog kit house, or pre-cut house, that was built in 1925 on Central Avenue in Phoenix, Arizona.

The Colonial Revival style "Brentwood" kit house was featured on the cover of the Gordon-Van Tine catalog from the mid to late 1920s. The namesake later owner, E. Payne Palmer, was a noted Phoenix physician.

== History ==
The E. Payne Palmer house, located at 6012 N. Central Avenue, is an example of the various Period or Revival style houses built in Phoenix between 1915 and 1940. This site was part of the Orangewood subdivision, originally platted for development in 1895 by local developer William J. Murphy. Murphy's central concept behind the development was to create a Phoenix suburb "wherein might be established rural homes at an easy distance from the city." The house assembly was completed in 1925.

No record has been found of the original owner, but the home is easily identifiable as a Gordon-Van Tine "Brentwood" model catalog home. From 1932 to 1939, Leslie Setter owned and occupied the house. E. Payne Palmer purchased the property in 1939.

== Architecture ==
The distinctive architectural features of the E. Payne Palmer house demonstrate both its association with the Period Revival styles and its uniqueness in the suburban southwest. It is a two-story Period Revival Style house based on Cape Cod and Colonial Styles of the eighteenth century. It has a rectangular plan, with a steep-pitched, clipped gable, roof and shed dormers, sheathed with wood shingles. While the roof form shows the Cape Cod influence, other characteristics of the Colonial Revival style appear in the facade.

It is symmetrical with a central, Georgian-style entry. It has a common pediment entry, with a segmental arch and wood pilasters that frame the paneled, wood door. The walls are stuccoed and have a sand finish. The windows are divided, multi-light wood casement windows that are symmetrically located. The lower floor on the front of the house has two large, paired, 10-light French doors and two small 4-light windows that frame the entry. The upper floor on the front of the house has two medium-sized, paired, 8-light windows set in individual dormers and two pairs of 8-light windows, set adjacent in a single central dormer. The windows have ornamental shutters with small S-shaped brackets known as shutter dogs that hold them in place.

There is one single chimney that is off-set south from center that protrudes from the roof on the rear of the house. The house also has two small rectangular vents on the gable ends. There is a small, single-story addition to the house located on the north elevation that includes a second-story porch on top. There is a small enclosed porch attached to the house located on the southwest corner and has a small gable roof.

The rear of the house features similar treatments, symmetry and proportions. There are three dormers similar to the front and French doors on the lower floor. Since the 1993 North Central Corridor Estate Survey, the house has been re-roofed with wood shingles replacing the asphalt shingles identified in the survey. The property is well maintained both inside and out by the homeowners.

The property includes a carriage house (historic), detached three-car garage (non-historic) and, a small, free-standing arbor on the sidewalk that leads to the front door. The carriage house is of similar construction as the main house, and was used as living quarters for household staff. It has stucco walls and a steep-pitched gable roof. It also has a screened extension with a steep-pitched, hip roof. The roof of this building is also wood shingle. The south gable on the structure reflects the character-defining clipped gable elements of the main house.

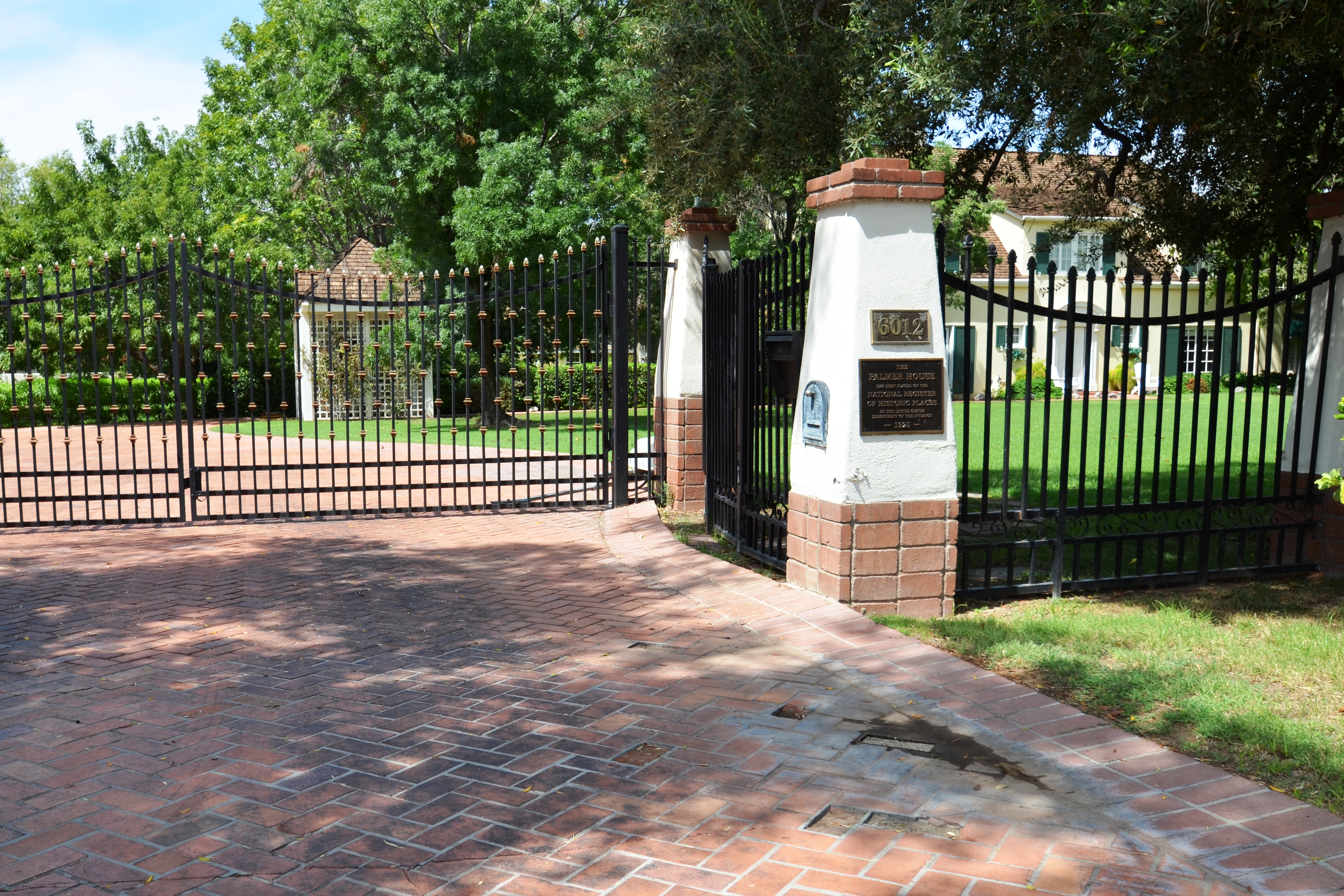
The Central Avenue entrance gates and driveway, with mailbox element and historic plaques, and arbor.

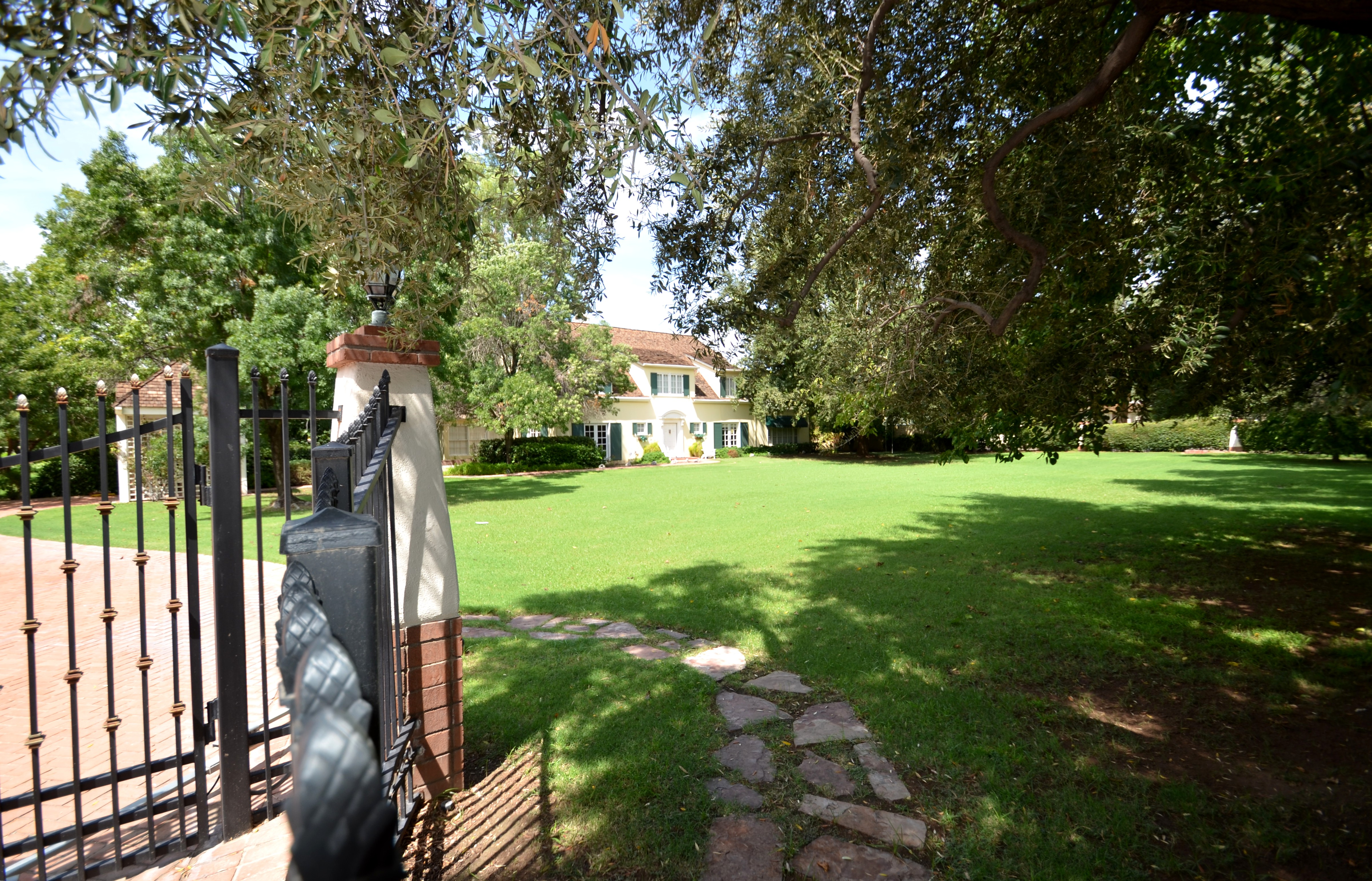
Pedestrian entrance walkway and gardens.

=== Site and gardens ===
The property is located on a prominent intersection that anchors the Orangewood development. The area features high style estate architecture and scenic drives in the center of the city. The location and integrity of the property demonstrate the high artistic values of the North Central Corridor Estates.

The house faces Central Avenue and anchors the southwest corner of the tree-lined and canopied portion of Central Avenue, known as the bridal path, that runs north from that point for the next two or more miles. The house and outbuildings are located on nearly one and a half acres of gardens on the corner of Bethany Home Road and Central Avenue. The property has a long cobblestone and decomposed granite driveway that runs along the south side of the property. There are gated drive entrances on Bethany Home Road and Central Avenue, with a concrete block wall that surrounds the property.

A 1949 newspaper article refers to the spacious gardens where they hosted society events. The rear of the house opens onto an extensive patio and pool area. Some of the elements in this area may be considered as part of the historic elements of the property. The particular garden features that appear in the 1949 newspaper article include the brick-capped tree planters and patio deck.

=== Significance ===
The E. Payne Palmer House is notable as an example of Period Revival architecture developed in Phoenix between 1915 and 1940, illustrating the characteristics of the style within the North Central Corridor's Rural Estate Development (1895-1942). Located along North Central Avenue, the structure serves as a representative example of American Colonial Revival architecture within the area's early suburban development.

== Kit Houses ==
Gordon-Van Tine catalog homes were purchased from catalogs released annually. These catalogs contained illustrations of the various home models available for purchase. The home featured on the cover was usually the most luxurious model offered by the company; the Brentwood is no exception.

A description by researcher Dale Wolicki of kit house manufacturing by the Gordon-Van Tine Company, the company that designed and manufactured the materials for the E. Payne Palmer House, explains:

"All designs were standardized to maximize efficiency and reduce waste in materials and labor. Lumber and hardware were purchased in bulk. The factories had skilled employees and special machines to cut difficult pieces such as rafters and staircases. Lumber was pre-cut to length, guaranteed to fit, ready to nail, and labeled for easy assembly. Floor joists and bridging, sub-flooring, finished flooring, studs, rafters, sheathing, clapboards, shingles, stucco, plaster or drywall, columns, railings, doors and windows, hardware, nails, and paint for two exterior coats were included in the order. Plumbing, electrical, and heating systems were available for an additional charge. Although the lumber and hardware were standardized, the designs were not and buyers were encouraged to personalize their order. Many models had two or three floor plans, while the exterior could be clapboards, shingles, stucco, or framed for brick. Walls, windows, and doors could be moved, added or eliminated. Porches, sun rooms, flower boxes, trellises, balconies, built-in cabinets, and a variety of door and sash patterns were available at an additional charge."

== Dr. E. Payne Palmer ==
Dr. E. Payne Palmer was a notable member of the medical community at local, national, and international levels. He made significant contributions for advancing hospital standardization and administration in the United States. Additionally, his contributions in surgical techniques, cancer research and patient care coincided with the advancements in medicine in the early 20th century. Dr. Palmer was also a prominent member and contributor to his community giving his time and money to religious, arts, and social organizations in order to improve the quality of life in Phoenix. The residence reflects Dr. Palmer's success as a physician and his significance in the development of the community.

Born in 1876 in Church Hill, Mississippi, Errol Payne Palmer graduated from Barnes Medical College of St. Louis, Missouri, in 1898. He moved to Phoenix in 1900 setting up his first practice at 108 North Center Street, now Central Avenue. Dr. Palmer related in his personal papers "I rode a bicycle for town calls and rented a horse and buggy from the livery stable for country calls." When Dr. Palmer arrived in Phoenix, "St. Joseph's Hospital had twelve beds and no operating room. A pair of carpenter sawhorses were placed in a patient's room and boards were put across the sawhorses to make an operating table. The part to be operated on was washed with warm water and soap, chloroform was the usual anesthetic and this was administered by some of the other surgeons."

In 1902 he "successfully removed a large brain tumor from a man who had received a head injury many years before." During the same year he "performed a cesarean section," which he recalled that this may have been the "first of its kind or nearly so for each of these procedures in Arizona."

During the fifty-year span of Dr. Palmer's career, he authored and contributed over sixty-five formal papers to the literature on medicine and surgery. In 1906, he published *Phoenix Arizona as a Health Resort for Tuberculous Patients. In 1904, he discussed "Normal saline solutions and their physiological uses." Then there followed a series of publications relating to cancer, its cause, case reports and treatment. Dr. Palmer was involved in luncheon discussions at the Harvard Club in New York that led to the formation in 1913 of the American Society for the Control of Cancer (now the American Cancer Society) . He was one of the first to advance the hereditary properties of cancer. He was also a pioneer in the use of lumbar spinal anesthesia. In 1936, he was invited to address the Second International College of Scientific Campaigns Against Cancer at Brussels, Belgium. At this time, he was also serving as the Chairman of the Cancer Control Committee of the Arizona State Medical Association.

Dr. Palmer was an active supporter of organized medicine and served as the president of the Maricopa County Medical Society, the Southwestern Medical Association, and the Arizona State Medical Association. He was a charter member of the American College of Surgery and "Governor of the College for twenty-eight years from the State of Arizona." In 1958 he was awarded the distinguished service award by the American College of Surgeons. He was honored as the originator of the College's Program of Hospital Standardization, first Fellow of the State of Arizona, and a supporter of the College's ideals and activities for fifty-five years.

The residence was owned and occupied by Dr. Palmer and his family from 1939 until his death in 1960. For over 21 years the home served as a backdrop for a variety of functions that catered to Palmer's professional and social associates.

== Bibliography for Dr. Palmer's career ==
- Arizona Republic, Great Increase in Room Space for Institution, circa January 1927.
- Arizona Republic, Palmers at Sea on the Fourth, circa September 1936.
- Arizona Republic, Phoenician Attends Conference on Cancer, circa September 1936.
- Arizona Republic, Local Medical Vets Honored, December 7, 1946.
- Arizona Republic, St. Joseph's Drive Fund Hits $812,715, January 13, 1948.
- Arizona Republic, Emergency Doctors List to be Posted, January 15, 1948.
- Arizona Republic, Blueprint for Happiness, August 14, 1949.
- Arizona Republic, Dr. Palmer Honored, circa 1953 .
- Arizona Republic, Veteran Surgeon of St. Joseph's Realizes Fulfillment of Hope Dating Back 50 Years, circa 1953.
- Arizona Republic, Palmers Mark 50th Anniversary; Surgeon served Phoenix 55 Years, August 2, 1957.
- Arizona Republic, Dr. Palmer Sr. Dies; Surgeon Here 55 years, February 7, 1960.
- Arizona Republic, Dr. E. P. Palmer Sr. Rosary is Tonight, February 8, 1960.
- Arizona Republic, Downtown's Hidden Jewel, April 4, 1999.
- Kennedy, John W. Arizona Medicine: Historical Essays. Phoenix, AZ: Heritage Publishers, 1990.
- McAlester, Virginia & Lee. A Field Guide to North American Houses. New York: Alfred A. Knopf, 1997.
- McClintock, James H. Arizona: prehistoric, aboriginal, pioneer, modern; the nation's youngest commonwealth within a land of ancient culture, vol. 3. Chicago: S.J. Clarke Publishing Company, 1916.
- Palmer, E. Payne. Personal Notes and Writings. Transcribed by John W. Kennedy, March 30, 1960.
- Palmer, E. Payne. The Surgeon's Interest in the Hospital. Hospital Management, November, 1937.
- Palmer, E. Payne. Three Generations of Hospitals: [A History of] St. Joseph's Hospital, Phoenix Arizona. Given to American Medical Association; December 16, 1952.
- Phoenix City Directories 1937–1950
- Rice, Trudy Thompson. St. Joseph's: The First 100 Years. Flagstaff AZ: Heritage Publishers, 1991.
- Schmitz, Vicky. Correspondence related to Dr. E. Payne Palmer. American College of Surgeons, January 21, 1999.
- St. Joseph's School of Nursing, Candlewood Yearbook, 1937.
