= Brentwood Historic District =

Historic district in Arizona, United States

- U.S. National Register of Historic Places
- U.S. Historic district
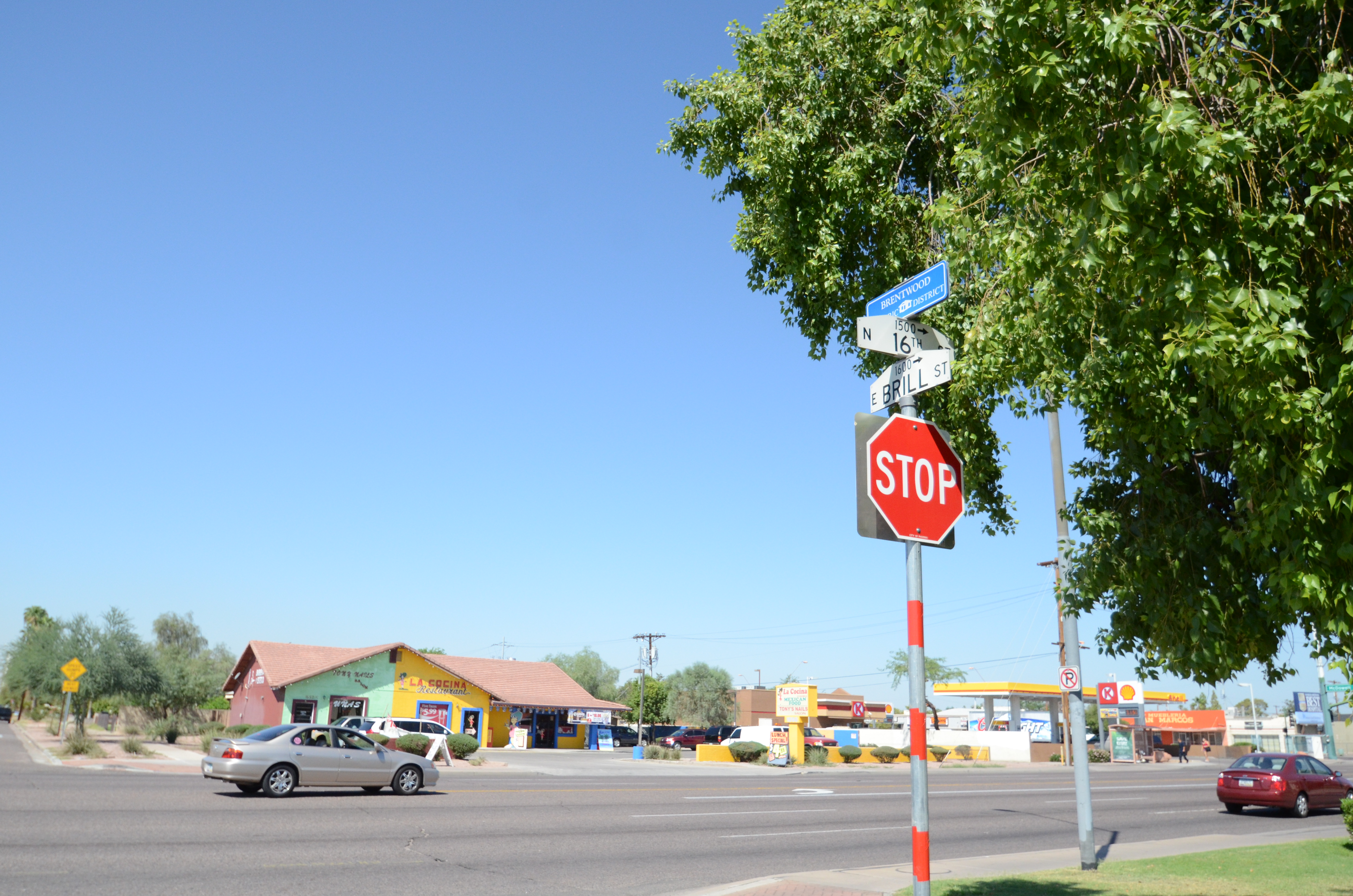
- Brentwood Historic District

- Location within Arizona Location within the United States
- Location: Roughly bounded by Brill St to the N, 20th St to the E, Culver St to the S, 16th St to the W, Phoenix, Arizona
- Coordinates: 33.46376°N 112.04336°W
- Area: 41.9 acres (17.0 ha)
- Built: 1924
- Architect: Greer, L.W. & Anna; et al.
- Architectural style: Late 19th and 20th Century Revivals, Modern Movement
- NRHP reference No.: 10000320
- Added to NRHP: June 9, 2010

The Brentwood Historic District in Phoenix, Arizona, is a 41.9-acre (17.0 ha) historic district that was listed on the National Register of Historic Places in 2010. It includes work dating to 1924. It includes Late 19th and 20th Century Revivals, Modern Movement and other architecture. The listing included 126 contributing buildings.

The district includes several subdivisions created between 1926 and 1946 and consists entirely of single-family homes with exceptions of a Mormon Stake Center at 1725 East Brill Street dating from 1947 to 1949, and three apartment buildings.

The oldest house in the district is apparently the 1916-constructed house at 1821 East Willetta Street.

Other names associated with the area include McDowell Heights, Brentwood, East Brentwood, Governor Hunt, Wright Davis, and Valley of the Sun.
