= Rubanisation =

Model of human settlement

Rubanisation is a model of human settlement in which the city and the countryside are considered as one space instead of two. It is informed by the belief that treating the rural and the urban as two distinct realms is inconsistent with social and environmental justice.

== Background ==
In Rubanisation, a reverse migration back to the village is encouraged and made possible through the availability of viable choices, prior to returning to repair the city devastated by unjust accumulation. Focusing on the problems of existing mega-cities is only a stop-gap solution. The argument is that in the present mode of development, the countryside has been largely neglected as cities become 'the exclusive focus of development,' compelling those in the rural areas to migrate to the city in search of better opportunities. This has resulted in a massive population explosion in most cities in the developing world, which manifests itself in the growing presence of slums. In the case of developed societies, small towns and villages have been losing population to the lure of the big cities for the excitement that they offer. Rubanisation postulates that unless the problem of rural poverty, which 'still remains the main cause for mass rural-urban migration,' is solved, and people given a real choice in deciding between rural and urban living, the problems of urbanisation remain intractable.

"Urbanism has been blind to the plight of the countryside for too long, and the tide is turning as we face the global financial crisis and climate change. And so the dominance of urbanism as an ideology must give way to a new economy of distributed happiness for all, to be found through social justice and a change in culture, in which an appreciation of community and knowledge for their own sakes and love of nature are prime."
