= Ashland Place Historic District (Phoenix, Arizona) =

Historic district in Arizona, United States

- U.S. National Register of Historic Places
- U.S. Historic district
- Location within Arizona Location within the United States
- Location: Roughly bounded by Central Ave., Vernon Ave., 3rd St. and Oak St., Phoenix, Arizona
- Coordinates: 33.47397°N 112.07107°W
- Area: 15 acres (6.1 ha)
- Built: 1920
- Built by: Home Builders Inc.
- Architect: C. Lewis Kelley
- Architectural style: Bungalow/craftsman, Mission/spanish Revival, Tudor Revival
- MPS: Residential Subdivisions and Architecture in Phoenix MPS
- NRHP reference No.: 94001486
- Added to NRHP: December 21, 1994

The Ashland Place Historic District is a single-family residential district in Phoenix, Arizona. It was one of the first speculative residential developments in Phoenix. The Period Revival and bungalow style residences were built in the 1920s by Home Builders, Inc. in association with realtors Greene and Griffin.

Some houses were designed by Phoenix architect C. Lewis Kelley, the "Home Artist" for the builders, who is known for his Period Revivals styled houses.

Ashland Place was added to the National Register of Historic Places on December 21, 1994.
