= Meridian Bank =

Meridian Bank could refer to:

== Institutions ==
- Crédit Agricole Srbija
- Meridian Bank (Canada)
- UMB Financial Corporation

== Buildings ==
- Meridian Bank Tower (Phoenix)
