= List of tallest buildings in Phoenix =

Skyline of Phoenix
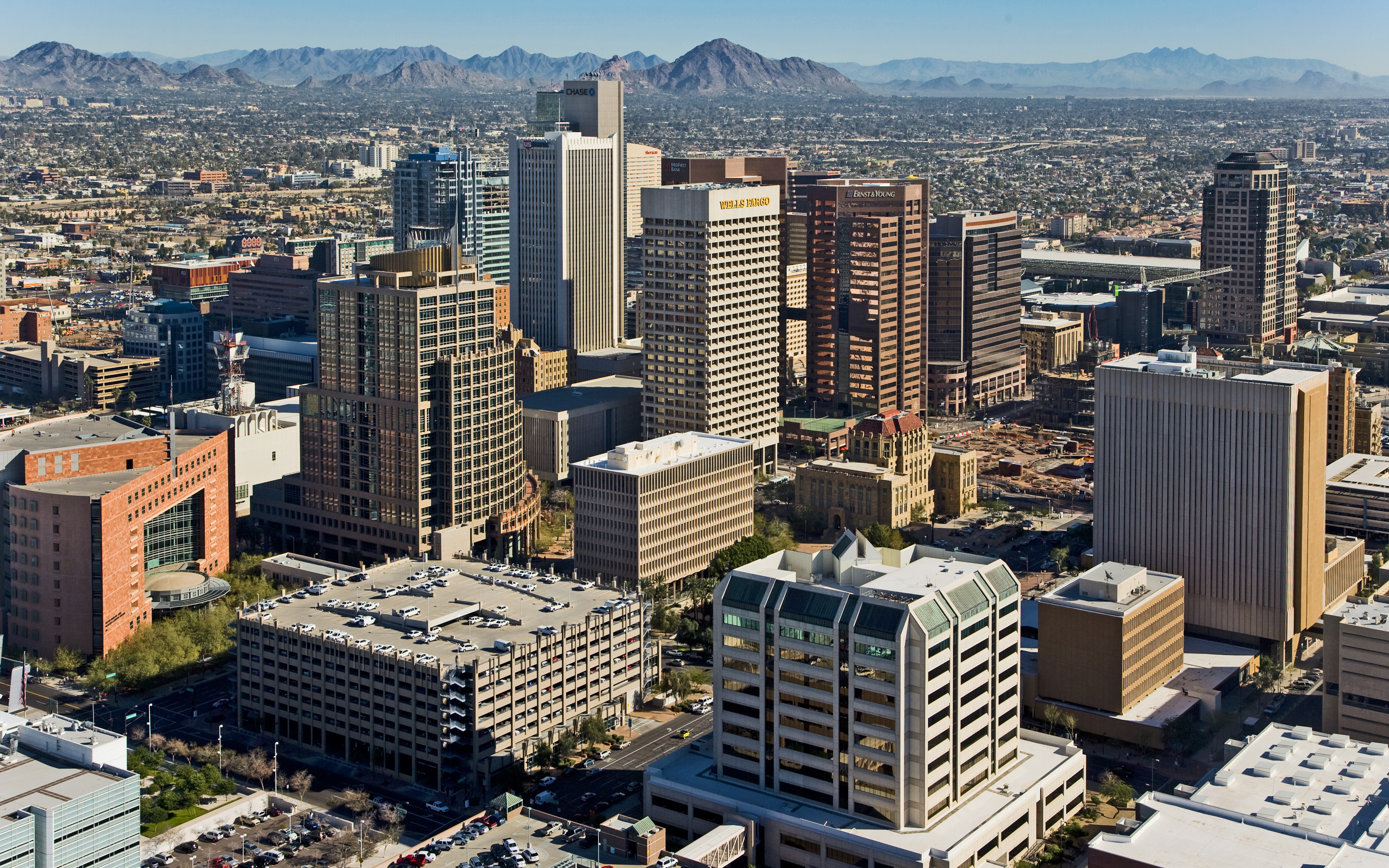
- Downtown Phoenix in 2009
- Tallest building: Chase Tower (1974)
- Tallest building height: 483 ft (147.2 m)

Number of tall buildings (2026)
- Taller than 75 m (246 ft): 43
- Taller than 100 m (328 ft): 19

Number of tall buildings — feet
- Taller than 200 ft (61.0 m): 63
- Taller than 300 ft (91.4 m): 24

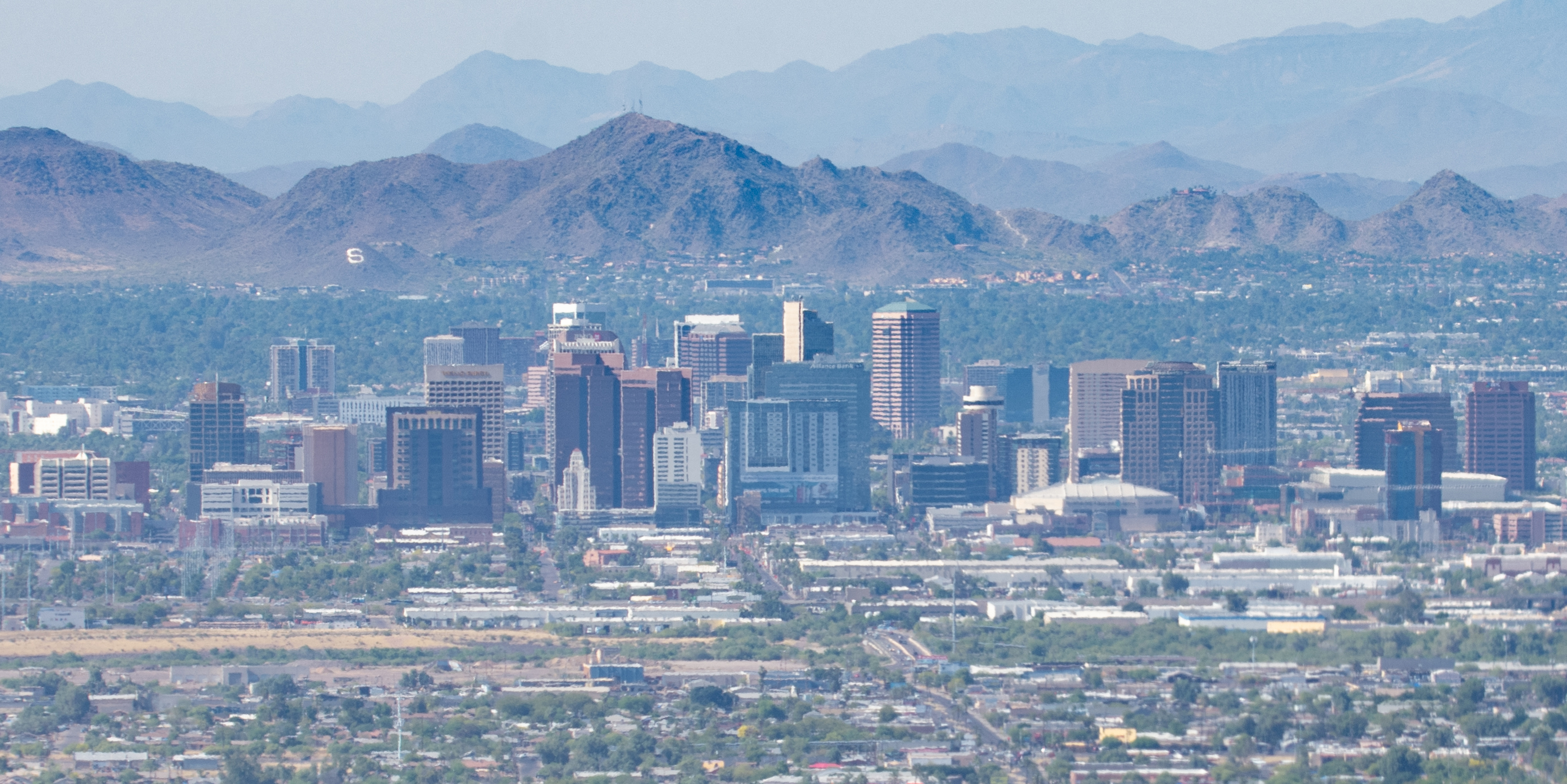
Downtown Phoenix in 2020

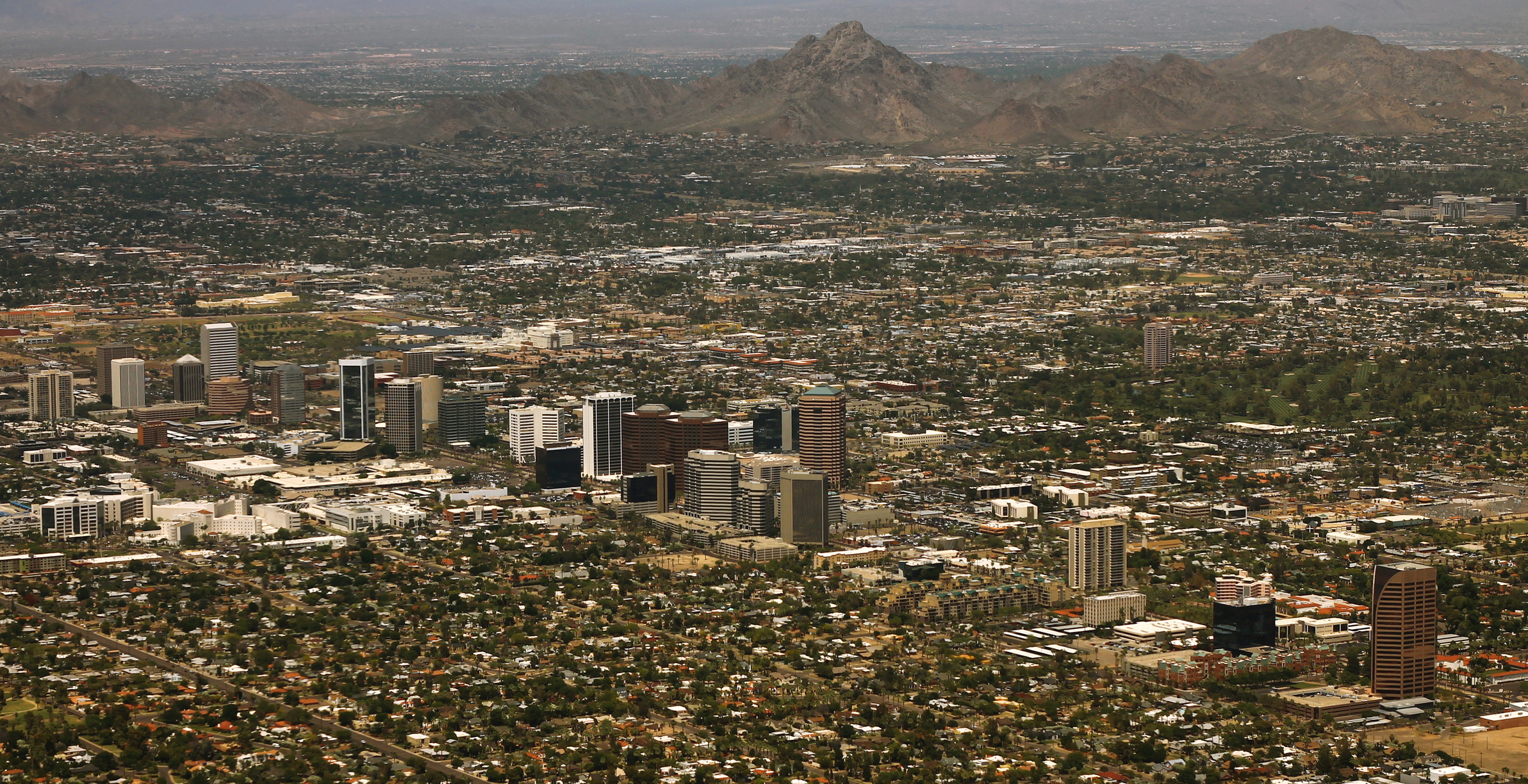
Midtown's Central Avenue Corridor in 2015

Phoenix is the capital and largest city of the U.S. state of Arizona. The tallest building in Phoenix is the 483 feet (147 m), 40-story Chase Tower, which was completed in 1972. It is also the tallest building in Arizona. With 63 completed high-rises taller than 200 feet (61 m) as of 2026, 19 of which have a height greater than 300 ft (91 m), Phoenix has the largest skyline in the core Southwestern United States. Despite this, Phoenix has a considerably small and short skyline for its population; it is the largest city in the United States without a skyscraper taller than 492 feet (150 m), while its metropolitan area has the lowest number of 300 ft (91 m) buildings per capita of any U.S. metro with more than 5 million people.

The history of tall buildings in Phoenix began with the completion of the ten-story Luhrs Building in 1924. The Westward Ho, opening as a hotel in 1927, stood as Phoenix's tallest building at 208 ft (63 m) for over 30 years. Since the addition of its 280 ft (85 m) steel tower and antenna in 1949, it remains the city's tallest structure today. Midtown Phoenix went through a building boom in the early 1960s. The 1970s brought development back to Downtown Phoenix and saw the completion of five high-rises greater than 200 ft (61 m), including Chase Tower and 101 North, then the city's second tallest building. High-rise construction in both districts continued until the early 1990s, after which development slowed considerably until the mid-2000s.

Between 2007 and 2010, the 1,000-room Sheraton Phoenix Downtown, the 34-story 44 Monroe apartment tower, and the CityScape development were added to the downtown skyline. Since 2016, there has been a surge in residential high-rises in Downtown Phoenix, many of which are north of Van Buren Street. This has been attributed to a population boom downtown. Between 1990 to 2025, Phoenix has nearly doubled the number of buildings taller than 200 ft (61 m), from 32 to 63. The proposed Astra Tower is expected to become the tallest building in Phoenix and the city’s first skyscraper to surpass 492 ft (150 m), should it reach its planned height of 541 feet (165 m). Construction is scheduled to begin in 2026, with completion anticipated in 2028.

The majority of Phoenix's tallest buildings are located downtown, south of the Papago Freeway. From downtown, Central Avenue extends northwards into Midtown, where it becomes known as the Central Avenue Corridor. Office and residential towers line both sides of the street, forming a linear row of high-rises. The Phoenix skyline is often pictured alongside its surrounding mountains, such as the Phoenix Mountains and South Mountains. The rest of Phoenix and its metropolitan area is mainly characterized by low-density sprawl. One exception is Tempe, where a number of high-rises have been erected downtown since the 2000s, near the main campus of Arizona State University.

== History ==
Number of high-rise buildings by height in Phoenix by the end of each year, based on the list below. Click on the legend to toggle a specific height on or off. View chart definition.

== Map of tallest buildings ==
=== Downtown Phoenix ===
The maps below show the location of buildings taller than 200 ft (61 m) in Downtown Phoenix, where the majority of such buildings are. Each marker is numbered by the building's height rank, and colored by the decade of its completion.

Buildings taller than 200 ft (61 m) in Downtown Phoenix.
- 1950s and before
- 1960s
- 1970s
- 1980s
- 1990s
- 2000s
- 2010s
- 2020s
1 Chase Tower
2 U.S. Bank Center
4 Alliance Bank Tower
5 44 Monroe
7 The Maeve Central Station
8 100 West Washington
9 Two Renaissance Square
10 Phoenix City Hall
11 Bank of America Tower
12 Sheraton Phoenix Downtown
14 One Renaissance Square
15 Freeport-McMoRan Center
17 SOL Modern
20 Altura PHX
22 Hyatt Regency Phoenix
23 PALMtower
24 Joy On 4th
28 One North Central
29 Skye on 6th
30 Adeline
31 Hotel Palomar & Cityscape Residences
32 Maricopa County Superior Court South Tower
34 X Phoenix Phase 1
35 Moontower PHX
36 Two Arizona Center
38 Saiya
40 Summit at Copper Square
41 Sora
42 111 West Monroe
44 Residence Inn by Marriott Phoenix Downtown
46 The Stewart
47 One Arizona Center
49 Derby
51 Central Court Building
52 Rosie
53 The Ryan
57 AVE Phoenix Sky
58 ANOVA Central Station
60 Westward Ho

=== Midtown Phoenix ===
North of Downtown Phoenix, the Central Avenue Corridor in Midtown Phoenix is lined by high-rises. The map below is zoomed out compared to the map of downtown above.

Buildings taller than 200 ft (61 m) in Midtown Phoenix.
- 1960s
- 1970s
- 1980s
- 1990s
- 2000s
- 2010s
3 U-Haul Tower
7 BMO Tower
13 3300 North Central Avenue
16 Phoenix Corporate Center
18 Phoenix Plaza I
19 Phoenix Plaza II
21 3200 Central
25 4041 North Central Avenue
26 Banner University Medical Center Tower
27 2600 Tower
33 4000 Tower
37 2800 Tower
39 Executive Towers Condominiums
43 Grand Central Tower
45 3800 Tower
48 3838 Tower
50 Regency House
54 Phoenix Financial Center
55 Crystal Point
56 CBIZ Plaza
59 Fellowship Towers
61 One Lexington
62 Copper Point Tower

== Cityscape ==
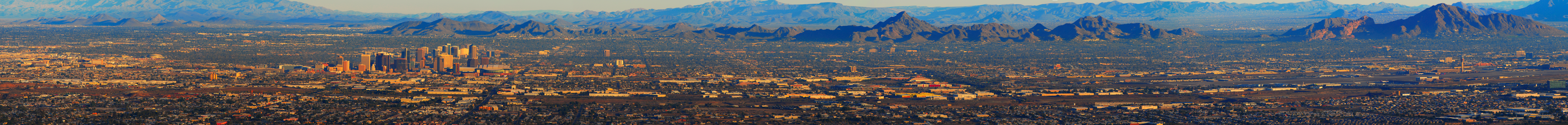
Phoenix skyline from South Mountain Park in 2009, including downtown and midtown

== Tallest buildings ==
This list ranks completed buildings in Phoenix that stand at least 200 ft (61 m) tall as of 2026, based on standard height measurement. This includes spires and architectural details but does not include antenna masts. The “Year” column indicates the year of completion. Buildings tied in height are sorted by year of completion with earlier buildings ranked first, and then alphabetically.

Was the tallest building in Phoenix upon completion

Rank	Name	Image	Location	Height ft (m)	Floors	Year	Purpose	Notes
1	Chase Tower		201 North Central Avenue 33°27′03″N 112°04′23″W	483 (147.2)	40	1972	Office	Tallest building in Arizona. Tallest building completed in Phoenix in the 1970s. Tallest building between San Diego, California, and San Antonio, Texas.
2	U.S. Bank Center		101 North 1st Avenue 33°27′00″N 112°04′29″W	407 (124.1)	31	1974	Office	Second-tallest building in Phoenix and Arizona.
3	U-Haul Tower		20 East Thomas Road 33°28′50″N 112°04′17″W	397 (121)	25	1989	Office	Tallest building in Midtown. Formerly known as CenturyLink Tower and Qwest Tower until 2024. Tallest building completed in Phoenix in the 1980s.
4	Alliance Bank Tower		1 East Washington Street 33°26′53″N 112°04′23″W	385 (117.3)	27	2010	Office	Tallest building completed in Phoenix in the 2010s.
5	44 Monroe		44 West Monroe Street 33°27′02″N 112°04′29″W	380 (115.8)	34	2008	Residential	Tallest fully residential building in Arizona. Tallest building completed in Phoenix in the 2000s.
6	BMO Tower		1850 North Central Avenue 33°28′06″N 112°04′28″W	374 (114)	24	1991	Office	Second-tallest building in Midtown. Also known as the Viad Corporate Center or Viad Tower. Formerly known as the Dial Tower. Tallest building completed in Phoenix in the 1990s.
7	The Maeve Central Station		50 West Van Buren Street 33°27′06″N 112°04′28″W	373 (113.6)	33	2025	Mixed-use	Mixed-use residential, retail, and office building. Tallest building completed in Phoenix in the 2020s.
8	100 West Washington		100 West Washington Street 33°26′55″N 112°04′32″W	372 (113.4)	27	1971	Office	Tallest building in Phoenix and Airzona briefly from 1971 to 1972. Formerly known as Wells Fargo Plaza. Was home to the Wells Fargo History Museum until it closed in 2020.
9	Two Renaissance Square		40 North Central Avenue 33°26′56″N 112°04′29″W	372 (113.4)	28	1990	Office	Taller building of the two-tower Renaissance Square plaza; connected by skybridge to One Renaissance Square.
10	Phoenix City Hall		200 West Washington Street 33°26′55″N 112°04′39″W	368 (112.2)	20	1994	Government	Phoenix's city hall and center of government. Tallest government building in Arizona.
11	Bank of America Tower		201 East Washington Street 33°26′53″N 112°04′14″W	360 (109.7)	23	2000	Office	Arizona headquarters for the Bank of America.
12	Sheraton Phoenix Downtown		340 North 3rd Street 33°27′08″N 112°04′14″W	360 (109.7)	32	2008	Hotel	Tallest hotel in Arizona.
13	3300 North Central Avenue		3300 North Central Avenue 33°29′13″N 112°04′27″W	356 (108.5)	27	1980	Office	
14	One Renaissance Square		2 North Central Avenue 33°26′55″N 112°04′27″W	347 (105.8)	26	1986	Office	Shorter building of the two-building Renaissance Square plaza; connected by skybridge to Two Renaissance Square.
15	Freeport-McMoRan Center		333 North Central Avenue 33°27′06″N 112°04′23″W	342 (104.1)	26	2009	Office	
16	Phoenix Corporate Center		3003 North Central Avenue 33°28′58″N 112°04′23″W	341 (103.9)	26	1965	Office	Tallest building in Phoenix and Arizona from 1965 to 1971. Tallest building completed in Phoenix in the 1960s.
17	SOL Modern		50 East Fillmore Street 33°27′18″N 112°04′23″W	331 (101)	29	2025	Residential	
18	Phoenix Plaza I		20 East Thomas Road 33°28′51″N 112°04′23″W	331 (100.9)	20	1988	Office	
19	Phoenix Plaza II		20 East Thomas Road 33°28′54″N 112°04′23″W	331 (100.9)	20	1990	Office	
20	Altura PHX		330 East Pierce Street 33°27′21″N 112°04′11″W	327 (99.6)	30	2019	Residential	Formerly known as Link PHX.
21	3200 Central		3200 North Central Avenue 33°29′08″N 112°04′28″W	320 (97.5)	24	1985	Office	Formerly known as Great American Tower.
22	Hyatt Regency Phoenix		122 North 2nd Street 33°26′59″N 112°04′19″W	317 (96.6)	20	1976	Hotel	
23	PALMtower		440 East Van Buren Street 33°27′07″N 112°04′04″W	316 (96) (Note: Sources do not state the exact height of this building. This figure was determined using Google Earth by subtracting the altitude of the building's lowest main pedestrian open-air entrance from its highest architectural point.)	28	2024	Residential	
24	Joy On 4th		700 North 4th Street 33°27′21″N 112°04′09″W	304 (93)	27	2022	Residential	Also known by its street address, 700 N 4th St.
25	4041 North Central Avenue		4041 North Central Avenue 33°29′37″N 112°04′21″W	295 (89.9)	22	1980	Office	
26	Banner University Medical Center Tower		1111 East McDowell Road 33°27′52″N 112°03′34″W	290 (88.4)	16	2018	Health	Tallest hospital tower in Arizona.
27	2600 Tower		2600 North Central Avenue 33°28′41″N 112°04′27″W	289 (88.1)	21	1982	Office	
28	One North Central		1 North Central Avenue 33°26′55″N 112°04′23″W	289 (88.1)	20	2001	Office	Formerly Phelps Dodge Centre.
29	Skye on 6th		817 North 6th Street 33°27′26″N 112°03′57″W	289 (88)	26	2023	Residential	
30	Adeline		222 East Jefferson Street 33°26′49″N 112°04′14″W	285 (87)	25	2021	Residential	
31	Hotel Palomar & Cityscape Residences		2 East Jefferson Street 33°26′51″N 112°04′24″W	283 (86.3)	26	2014	Mixed-use	Mixed-use residential and hotel building. Also known as CityScape Tower 2.
32	Maricopa County Superior Court South Tower		175 West Madison Street 33°26′44″N 112°04′33″W	284 (86)	16	2012	Government	
33	4000 Tower		4000 North Central Avenue 33°29′33″N 112°04′31″W	280 (85.3)	23	1964	Mixed-use	Mixed-use office and hotel building. Formerly known as Kent Tower until 1986.
34	X Phoenix Phase 1		200 West Monroe Street 33°27′03″N 112°04′37″W	266 (81)	20	2022	Residential	
35	Moontower PHX		811 North 3rd Street 33°27′26″N 112°04′11″W	266 (81)	24	2023	Residential	
36	Two Arizona Center		400 East Van Buren Street 33°27′09″N 112°04′05″W	260 (79.2)	20	1990	Office	
37	2800 Tower		2800 North Central Avenue 33°28′44″N 112°04′27″W	258 (78.6)	20	1988	Office	
38	Saiya		802 North 1st Avenue 33°27′26″N 112°04′33″W	255 (78)	23	2024	Residential	
39	Executive Towers Condominiums		207 West Clarendon Avenue 33°29′28″N 112°04′37″W	255 (77.7)	22	1964	Residential	Tallest building in Phoenix briefly from 1964 to 1965.
40	Summit at Copper Square		310 South 4th Street 33°26′41″N 112°04′09″W	254 (77.4)	22	2007	Residential	
41	Sora		355 North Central Avenue 33°27′08″N 112°04′24″W	254 (77)	23	2021	Residential	Formerly known as Kenect Phoenix.
42	111 West Monroe		111 West Monroe Street 33°27′00″N 112°04′32″W	247 (75.3)	18	1964	Office	Also known as The Monroe. Formerly known as the First American Title Building and Arizona Title Building.
43	Grand Central Tower		3550 North Central Avenue 33°29′21″N 112°04′27″W	246 (75)	20	1960	Office	Formerly known as the Guaranty Bank Building. Tallest building in Phoenix from 1960 to 1964.
44	Residence Inn by Marriott Phoenix Downtown		132 South Central Avenue 33°26′47″N 112°04′27″W	246 (74.9)	20	2017	Hotel	
45	3800 Tower		3800 North Central Avenue 33°29′30″N 112°04′28″W	245 (74.7)	17	1962	Office	
46	The Stewart		800 North Central Avenue 33°27′26″N 112°04′27″W	242 (73.8)	19	2019	Residential	
47	One Arizona Center		400 East Van Buren Street 33°27′06″N 112°04′07″W	240 (73.2)	18	1989	Office	
48	3838 Tower		3838 North Central Avenue 33°29′29″N 112°04′32″W	240 (73.2)	20	1971	Office	Formerly known as the Greyhound Building.
49	Derby		800 North 2nd Street 33°27′24″N 112°04′18″W	239 (73)	21	2022	Residential	
50	Regency House		2323 North Central Avenue 33°28′26″N 112°04′23″W	235 (71.6)	21	1964	Residential	
51	Central Court Building		201 West Jefferson Street 33°26′47″N 112°04′36″W	234 (71.3)	13	1977	Government	
52	Rosie		625 North 2nd Avenue 33°27′22″N 112°04′34″W	234 (71.3)	19	2024	Residential	Formerly known as X Roosevelt.
53	The Ryan		188 East Jefferson Street 33°26′51″N 112°04′17″W	232 (70.7)	17	2020	Residential	Residential portion of the Block 23 development.
54	Phoenix Financial Center		3443 North Central Avenue 33°29′16″N 112°04′22″W	228 (69.5)	18	1970	Office	Originally opened in September 1964 as a 10 story building. The architectural plans called for two 18-story buildings and two one story structures. In 1968, construction began on adding an additional eight stories.
55	Crystal Point		1040 East Osborn Road 33°29′16″N 112°03′35″W	224 (68.3)	20	1989	Office	
56	CBIZ Plaza		3101 North Central Avenue 33°29′03″N 112°04′24″W	217 (66.1)	16	1980	Residential	
57	AVE Phoenix Sky		601 North 3rd Avenue 33°27′18″N 112°04′38″W	214 (65)	19	2023	Residential	
58	ANOVA Central Station		311 North 1st Avenue 33°27′07″N 112°04′29″W	214 (65.2)	22	2025	Residential	
59	Fellowship Towers		222 East Indianola Avenue 33°29′33″N 112°04′13″W	212 (64.6)	17	1972	Residential	
60	Westward Ho		618 North Central Avenue 33°27′18″N 112°04′27″W	208 (63)	16	1929	Residential	Tallest building in Arizona for 31 years until the completion of the Guaranty Bank Building in 1960. Including the antenna and spire, Westward Ho tops out at 488 ft (149 m), making it the tallest structure in Downtown Phoenix.
61	One Lexington		1 East Lexington Avenue 33°29′10″N 112°04′24″W	200 (61)	15	1974	Residential	Originally an office building for the Southern Arizona Bank and Trust Company called the Southern Arizona Bank Plaza, the facade was redone and the structure was converted into condominiums in early 2010.
62	Copper Point Tower		3030 North 3rd Street 33°29′00″N 112°04′12″W	200 (61)	14	1986	Office	Also known as Abacus Towers.
63	Valleywise Health Medical Center		2601 East Roosevelt Street 33°27′27″N 112°01′39″W	200 (61)	19	2023	Health	

== Tallest under construction or proposed ==
=== Under construction ===
The following table includes buildings under construction in Phoenix that are planned to be at least 200 ft (61 m) tall as of 2026, based on standard height measurement. The “Year” column indicates the expected year of completion. Buildings that are on hold are not included.

Name	Image	Height ft (m)	Floors	Year (est.)	Status
Ray Phoenix		291 (89)	26	2026	Topped-out
Denu Hotel & Spa		211 (64)	17	2026	Topped-out

=== Proposed ===
The following table includes approved and proposed buildings in Phoenix that are expected to be at least 200 ft (61 m) tall as of 2026, based on standard height measurement. The “Year” column indicates the expected year of completion. A dash “–“ indicates information about the building’s height, floor count, or year of completion is unknown or has not been released.

Name	Height ft (m)	Floors	Year	Status	Notes
Astra Tower 1	541 (165)	44	2028	Approved	Would become the tallest building in Arizona upon completion.
Astra Tower 2	424 (129)	34	2028	Approved	
Jefferson Place	350 (107)	29	–	Proposed	
X Phoenix (Phase 2)	320 (98)	25	–	On hold	Construction was halted on September 2023.
2nd St & Portland St	270 (82)	24	2027	Proposed	
1500 N Central Ave	250 (76)	25	–	Proposed	
Link PHX Phase 3	250 (76)	25	–	Proposed	

== Timeline of tallest buildings ==
This lists buildings that once held the title of tallest building in Phoenix.

Name	Image	Street address	Years as tallest	Height ft (m)	Floors	Reference
Arizona State Capitol		1700 West Washington Street	1899–1920	92 (28)	4	
Heard Building		112 North Central Avenue	1920–1924	102 (31)	8	
Luhrs Building		13 West Jefferson Street	1924–1929	138 (42)	10	
Westward Ho		618 North Central Avenue	1929–1960	208 (63)	16	
Meridian Bank Tower		3550 North Central Avenue	1960–1964	252 (76)	21	
Executive Towers Condominiums		207 West Clarendon Avenue	1964-1965	255 (78)	22	
Phoenix Corporate Center		3003 North Central Avenue	1965–1971	341 (104)	26	
100 West Washington^{[A]}		100 West Washington Street	1971–1972	356 (109)	27	
Chase Tower^{[B]}		201 North Central Avenue	1972–present	483 (147)	40	

== Notes ==
A. This building was originally known as the First National Bank Plaza but has since been renamed Wells Fargo Plaza.
B. This building was originally known as the Valley Bank Center. The name was later changed to Bank One Center, but has been known as Chase Tower since 2005.
