= Phoenix Plaza =

Mixed use office complex in Phoenix, Arizona

Coordinates: 33.481317°N 112.072477°W

Phoenix Plaza is a mixed use office complex located in midtown Phoenix, Arizona. It was built between 1988 and 1990 at a cost of US$158 million. There is 1,600,000 square feet (150,000 m^{2}) of office space plus 225 hotel rooms. Phoenix Plaza has three hi-rise office buildings, a large parking garage and a hotel tower. Two distinct design concepts can be seen. The façades of U-Haul Tower, the parking structure and Hilton Suites are colored in the late 1980s design trend of combining the pastel hues of “dusty rose” with turquoise. Phoenix Plaza Towers One and Two are sleek, modern, highly polished and complement the desert inspired buildings, which share their site. The architect for the buildings was Langdon Wilson and Phoenix Plaza was developed by the Koll Company and BetaWest Properties, Inc.

== U-Haul Tower ==
U-Haul Tower
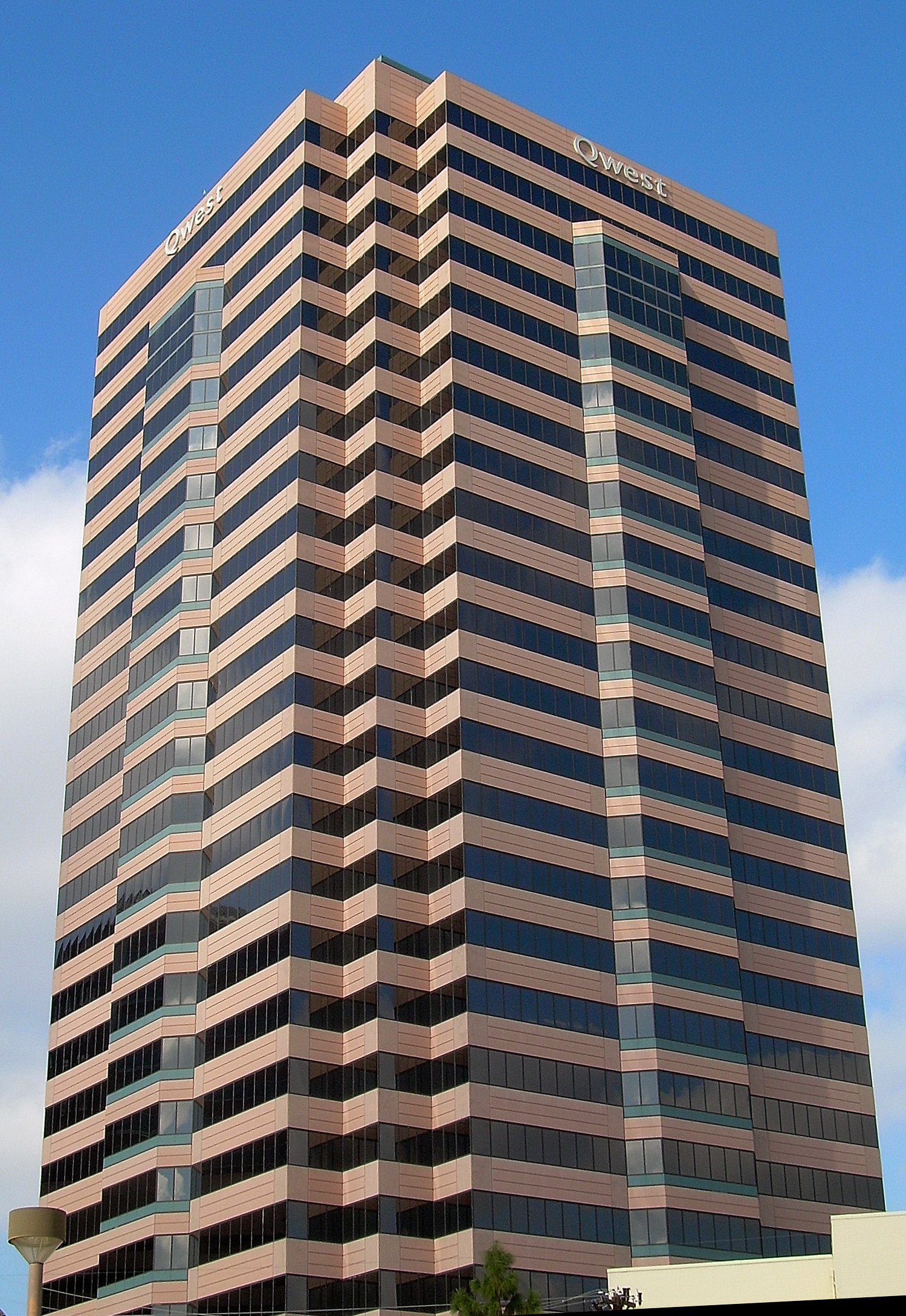
- U-Haul Tower
- Interactive map of the U-Haul Tower area
- Former names: US West Tower, Quest Tower

General information
- Location: Phoenix, Arizona, 20 E Thomas Road
- Completed: 1989

Height
- Height: 397 ft (121 m)

Technical details
- Floor count: 26

Design and construction
- Architect: Langdon Wilson
- Developer: Koll Company/BetaWest Properties, Inc.
- Main contractor: Koll Construction

U-Haul Tower, formerly known as CenturyLink Tower and Qwest Tower, at 397 feet (121 m) and 26 floors, is the tallest building in Arizona outside of Downtown Phoenix, and the 3rd tallest building in Phoenix and Arizona overall. The tower's design is a basic square with vertical setbacks on all four sides giving each actual corner of the tower three 45-degree angled corners. Adding to the postmodern element is the addition of a single bay style window centered on each face of the tower and spanning floors 2 to 23. The crown is a hip roof, pyramid design and is colored turquoise. U-Haul Tower was completed in 1989.

== Embassy Suites by Hilton ==
Embassy Suites by Hilton Phoenix Downtown North is an 11-story, 225-room, all-suite hotel. The main floor plate is shaped like a table-cut diamond. Guest rooms ring a dramatic atrium which also rises 11 floors. The Hilton Suites was completed in 1990.

== Phoenix Plaza Towers ==
Phoenix Plaza Tower One and Two
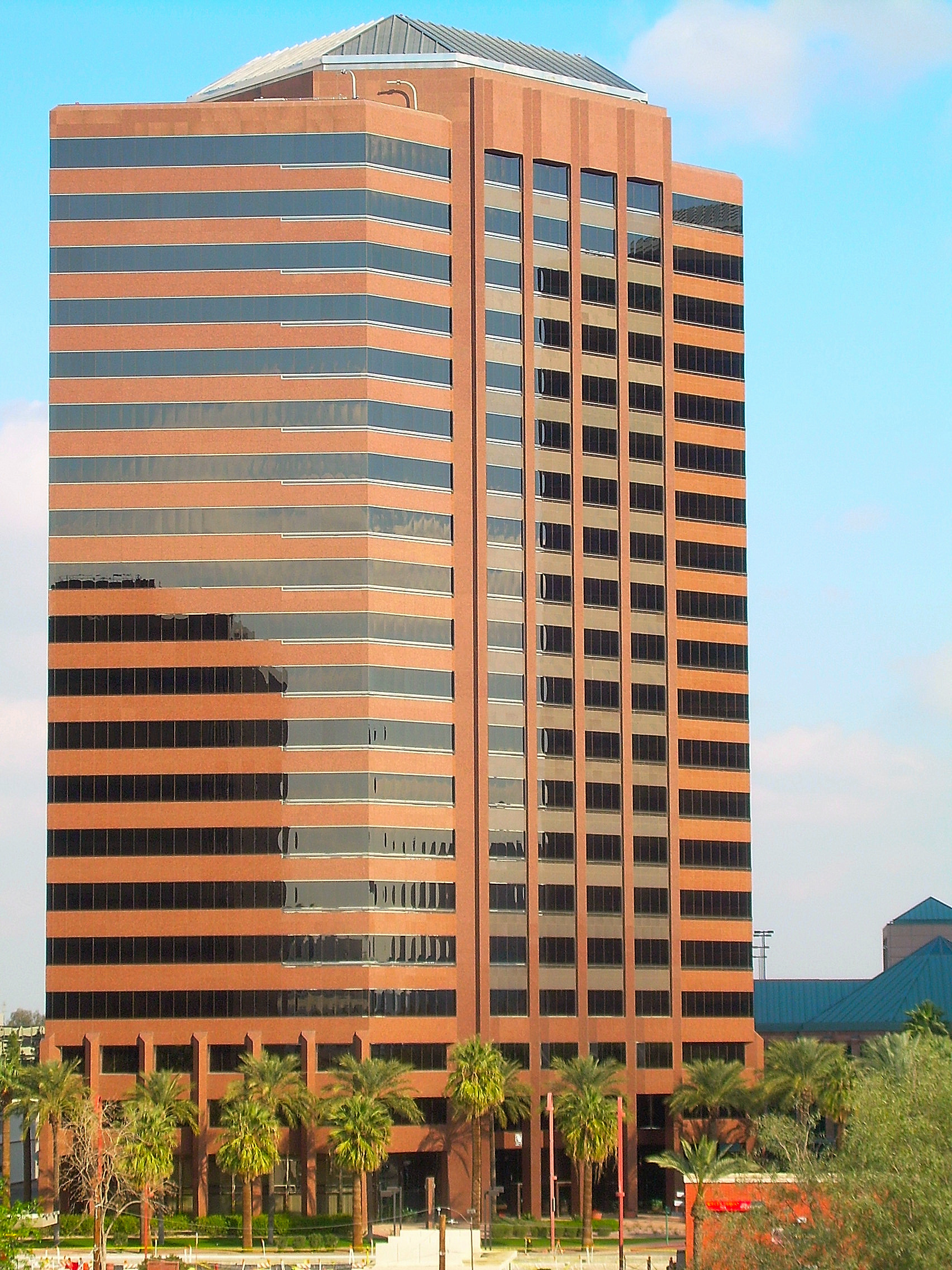
- Phoenix Plaza Tower Two
- Interactive map of the Phoenix Plaza Tower One and Two area

General information
- Location: Phoenix, Arizona, 2901 N Central Ave. (tower one), 2929 N Central Ave. (tower two)
- Completed: 1988 (tower one), 1990 (tower two)

Height
- Height: 331 ft (101 m)

Technical details
- Floor count: 20

Design and construction
- Architect: Langdon Wilson
- Developer: Koll Company/BetaWest Properties Inc.
- Main contractor: Koll Construction

Phoenix Plaza Tower One and Phoenix Plaza Tower Two are in the shape of an elongated hexagon topped by a rectangular hip roof. Each tower is 331 ft (101 m) tall and 20 stories. They are finished in polished granite and red spandrel panels. Tower One was completed in 1988, Tower Two completed in 1990.

Phoenix Plaza was awarded the BOMA Building of the Year Award in 1993, 1994, 1995, 1999, and 2000 for superior tenant services and building operation.

Tenants include the headquarters of Banner Health.

== Gallery ==
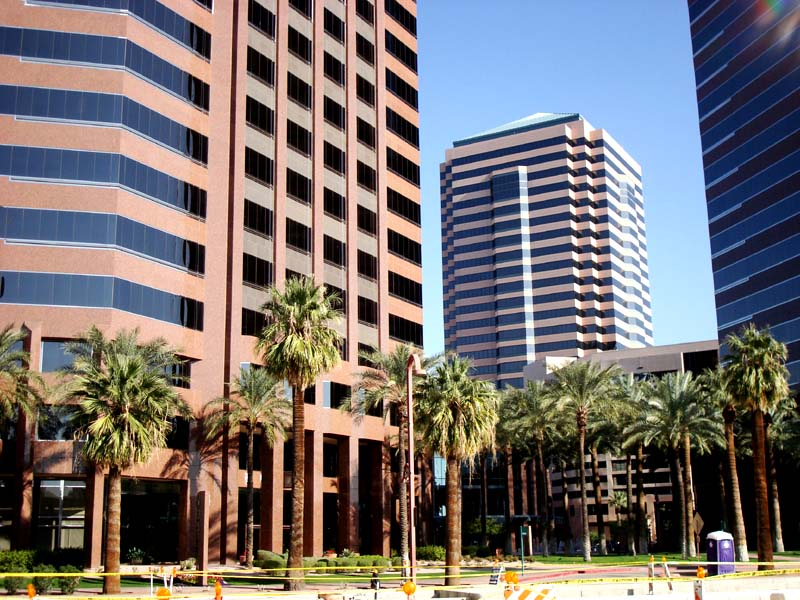
The U-Haul Tower in between the Phoenix Plaza Towers.

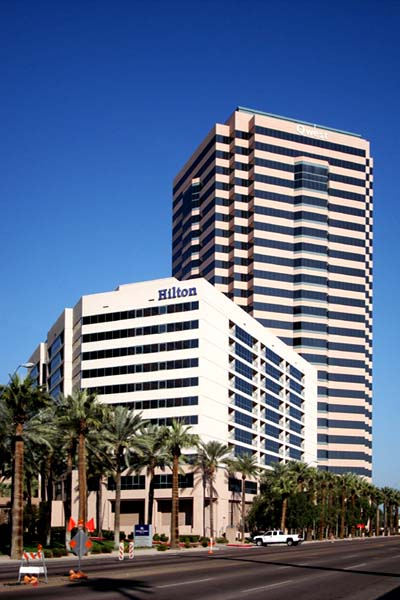
U-Haul Tower, 3rd tallest building in Arizona, and the Hilton Suites

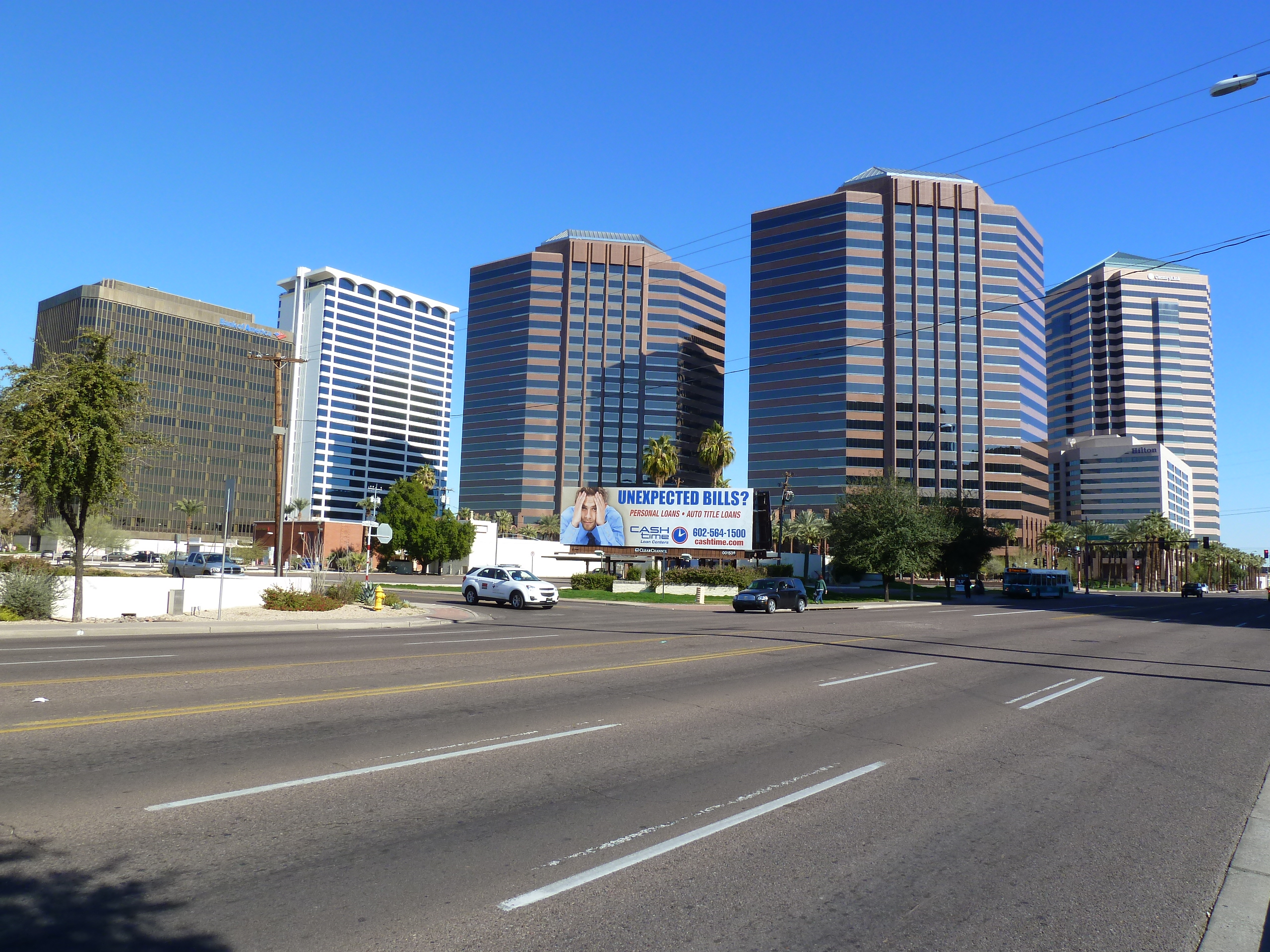
Phoenix Plaza towers at center right with the adjacent Phoenix Corporate Center and 3030 N Central

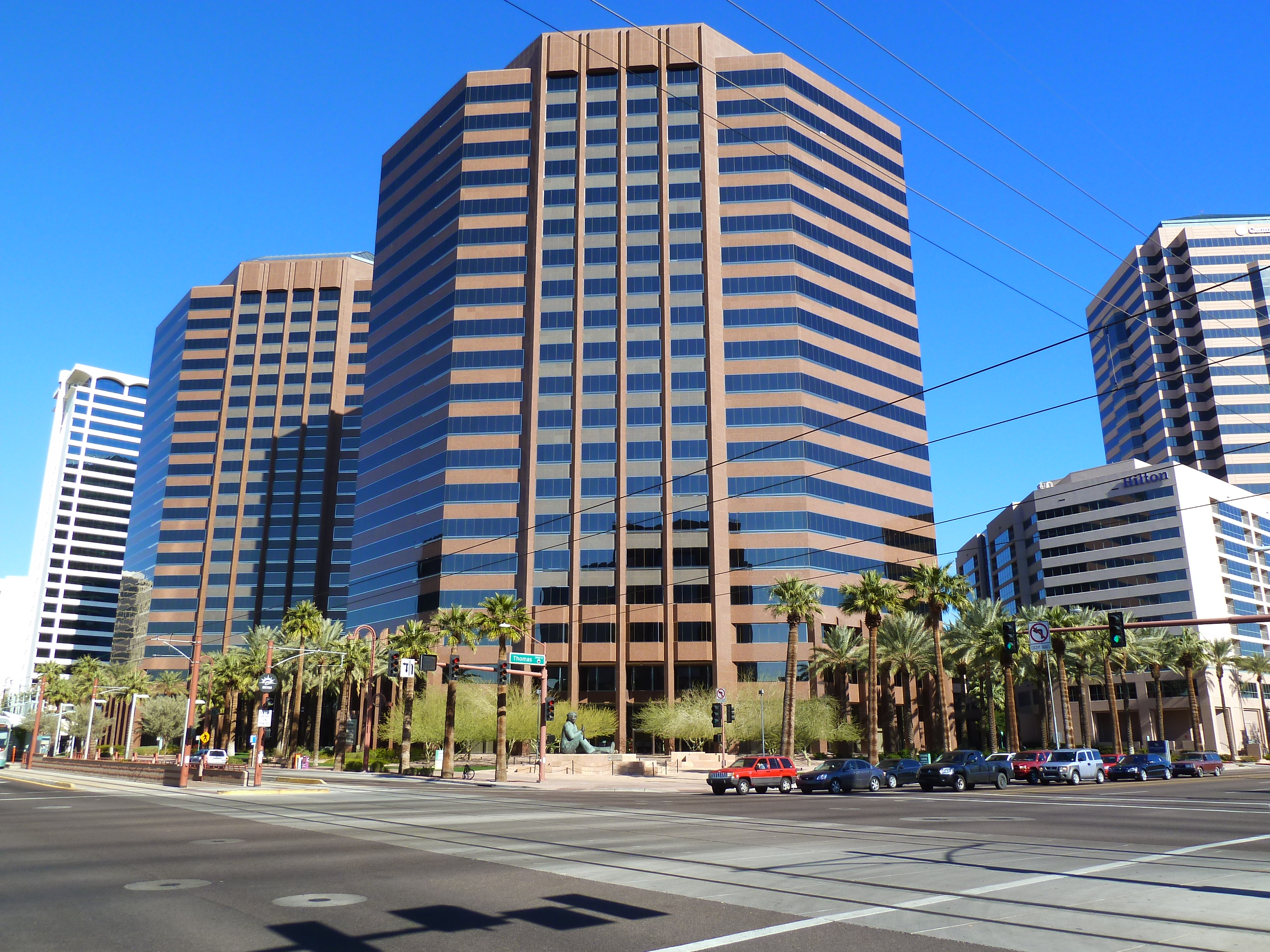
View of the complex from Central Avenue

== See also ==
- List of tallest buildings in Arizona
- List of tallest buildings in Phoenix
- Midtown Phoenix
- Phoenix
