= One North Central =

High-rise in Phoenix, Arizona

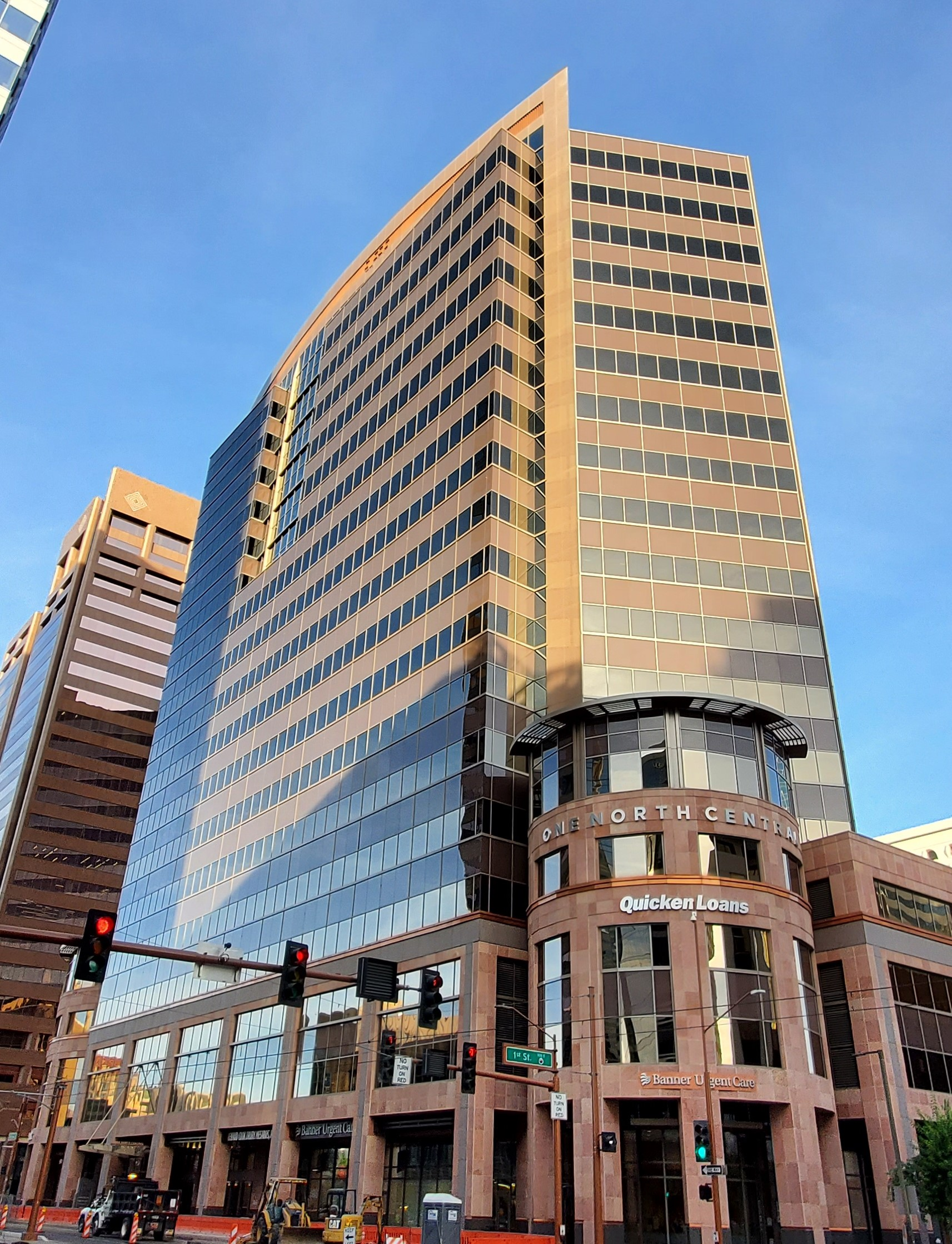
- One North Central in 2021
- Interactive map of the One North Central area

General information
- Type: Office
- Location: 1 North Central Avenue, Phoenix
- Coordinates: 33.4486°N 112.0732°W
- Construction started: 2000
- Completed: 2001
- Owner: Parallel Capital partners

Technical details
- Floor count: 20
- Floor area: 410,000 square feet (38,090 m^{2})

Design and construction
- Architect: SmithGroup
- Developer: Ryan Companies

One North Central, formerly the Phelps Dodge Tower, is a high-rise office building located along Central Avenue in the Downtown area of Phoenix, Arizona, United States. Its name is a reference to its street address at 1 N. Central Avenue. The tower rises 20 floors and 290 feet (88 m) in height. Owned by Parallel Capital Partners, One North Central was built in 2001 and initially served as the headquarters for the Phelps Dodge mining company. The tower was designed by SmithGroup, and Ryan Companies was the developer. Today it stands as the 29th-tallest building in Phoenix. Phelps Dodge was subsequently acquired by Freeport McMoRan Inc., who moved the corporate offices two blocks north into the newly constructed Freeport-McMoRan Center.

Mitsubishi Estate Co. Ltd. purchased the building in 2008 for $128 million. In 2015 the building was sold to its current owner Parallel Capital Partners for $93.7 million. In 2017, Quicken Loans (now Rocket Mortgage) announced plans to lease 150,000 square feet of office space on 6 floors of One North Central. The move was completed in 2018, with sister company Amrock opening a regional office in the building in 2021.

== See also ==
- List of tallest buildings in Phoenix
