= 100 West Washington =

High-rise

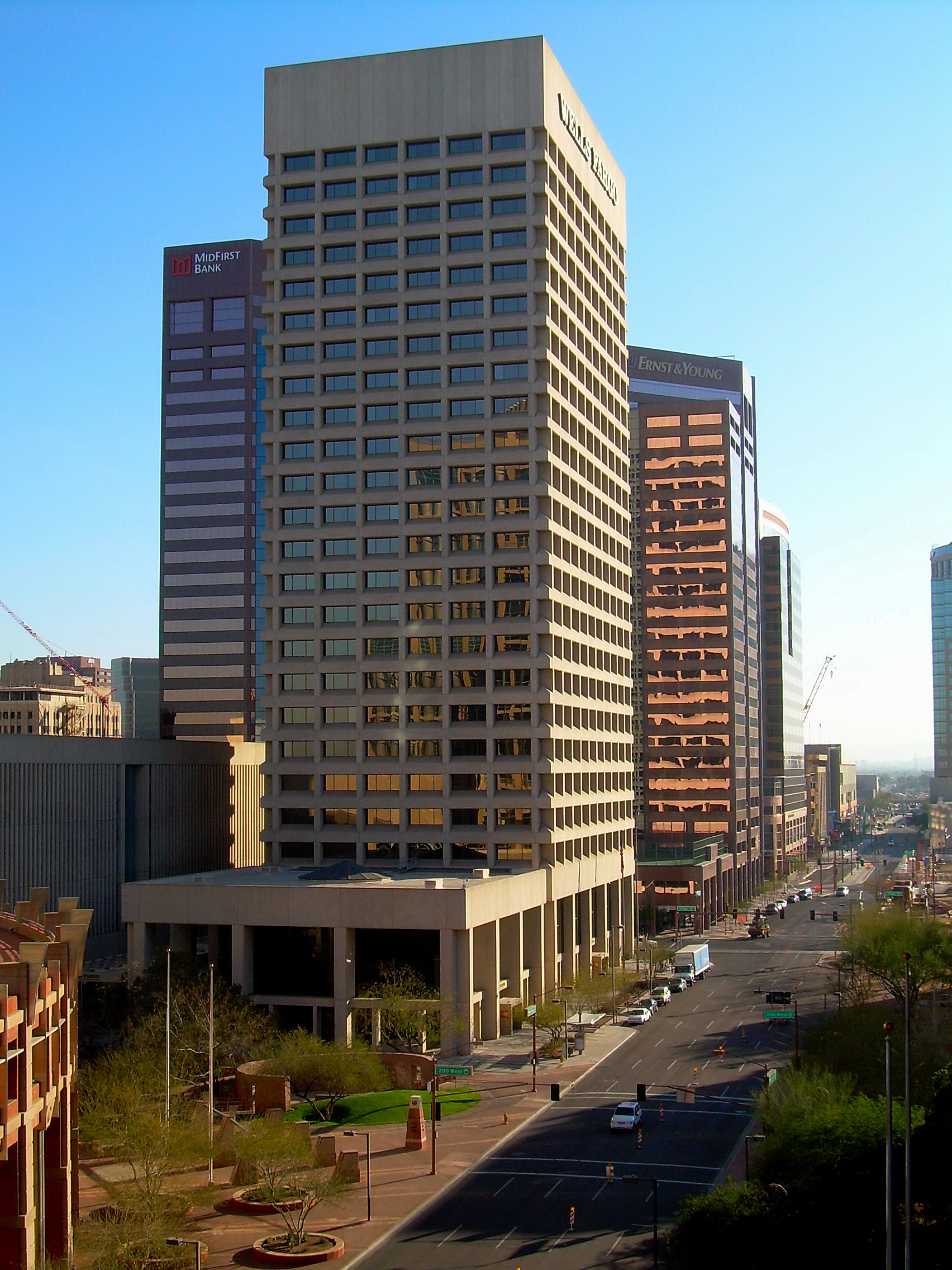
- 100 West Washington with now-removed marquee
- Interactive map of the 100 West Washington area
- Former names: First National Bank Plaza; First Interstate Bank Building; Wells Fargo Plaza

General information
- Type: Government
- Location: Washington at 1st Avenue; Phoenix
- Coordinates: 33.4483°N 112.0757°W
- Completed: 1971
- Owner: City of Phoenix

Height
- Roof: 356 ft (109 m)
- Top floor: 27

Technical details
- Floor count: 27
- Floor area: 419,997 sq ft (39,019.0 m^{2})

Design and construction
- Architect: Charles Luckman and Associates
- Structural engineer: Magadini Associates
- Main contractor: Henry C. Beck Company

100 West Washington is a high-rise skyscraper in Downtown Phoenix, Arizona, United States. It is currently the headquarters of the Phoenix Police Department.

Formerly known as Wells Fargo Plaza, it opened as the First National Bank Plaza on October 25, 1971 and was later known as the First Interstate Bank Building. It is 356 feet (109 m) tall. It is designed in the International Style with elements of Brutalism.

The tower was designed by the Phoenix office of Charles Luckman and Associates and constructed by the Henry C. Beck Company.

The tower sits on a base three stories high, then rises to its full height. The windows in angular casements hint at Brutalism but the repetition and sculpted mullions more strongly reflect the International style.

The Wells Fargo History Museum was located on the first floor, but closed in 2020. Exhibits included an extensive collection of western-themed art depicting Wells Fargo's role in the mines of Arizona, a 19th-century stagecoach, telegraph equipment and minerals.

After anchor tenant Wells Fargo departed for its suburban campus located in nearby Chandler, the Phoenix City Council voted in July 2021 to purchase the building for $46.5 million. The primary motivation at the time was to relocate the City's 911 operations and other city departments as needed. The large yellow Wells Fargo logo that had adorned the building's north and south facades for years was removed in late 2021, reflecting the change in ownership.

In June 2022, the City of Phoenix began soliciting bids to relocate the Phoenix Police Department to the tower at an estimated renovation cost of $90 million. No other city departments are programmed for the building. The building reopened in 2026.

Preceded by Phoenix Corporate Center	Tallest Building in Phoenix; 1971–1972; 113m	Succeeded by Valley Center (now Chase Tower)
