= Phoenix City Square =

Mixed-use high-rise in Arizona

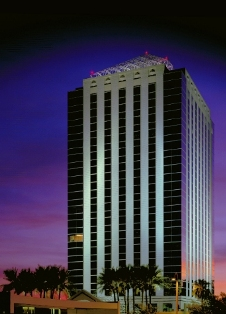
- 3800 Tower at Phoenix City Square

Project
- Developer: Del Webb Corporation
- Architect: Flatow, Moore, Bryan, and Fairburn (original), Cornoyer-Hendrick (renovation)
- Owner: Barker Pacific Group

Physical features
- Major buildings: 3 office towers, hotel, open-air retail plaza, 1200-car parking garage
- Streets: Central Avenue
- Transport: Indian School/Central Avenue

Location
- Interactive map of Phoenix City Square
- Location in Arizona
- Coordinates: 33.4915°N 112.0757°W
- Country: United States
- State: Arizona
- City: Phoenix
- Address: 3800-4000 Central Avenue, Phoenix, Arizona 85012

Phoenix City Square, formerly Kent Plaza and the Rosenzweig Center, is a mixed use high rise complex covering 15 acres at 3800-4000 N. Central Ave. in Phoenix, Arizona. The project was developed by the Del Webb Corporation in 1962. The complex features 3 office towers, a hotel, an open-air retail plaza, and a 1200-car parking garage. City Square was designed by the architectural firm of Flatow, Moore, Bryan, and Fairburn. The towers were constructed in 1962, 1964, and 1971. 3800 Tower is 194,482 square feet (18,068.0 m^{2}); 3838 Tower is 236,094 square feet (21,933.9 m^{2}); and 4000 Tower is 295,797 square feet. There is also a large 35,000-square-foot (3,300 m^{2}) Fitness Center, known as Sports Club at City Square, that is part of the complex.

Phoenix City Square is on Central Avenue in Phoenix, Arizona. The B Line of the Valley Metro Rail & Streetcar system runs down this portion of Central Avenue. This part of the line was opened on December 27, 2008 as part of the original Valley Metro Rail line. It remains to be seen if this will have an impact in increasing tenancy at City Square, though it will serve to connect the area to Downtown Phoenix. There are a variety of businesses that are part of the complex. Besides having a fitness center, there are also cafes, a day care, a barber shop, law offices, accounting firms, engineering consultants, etc. There is also an on-site U.S. Bank as part of the City Square area.

== History ==
The plot of land used to develop the Rosenzweig Center had been owned by the Rosenzweig family for 46 years when construction began in 1961. Portions of the property were formerly occupied by the Mirador Ballroom and a yard owned by Superlite Builders Supply Co. on the north portion. The Webb Corporation planned the complex as a "dramatic, high quality, self-contained complex of buildings around a landscaped plaza that, in time, will mean to this area (downtown Phoenix) what New York's Rockefeller Center or Philadelphia's Penn Center means to the East." The project was announced by the Webb Corporation on June 10, 1961.

The complex was built as the Rosenzweig Center and was originally owned by North Central Development Co., a partnership of Newton and Harry Rosenzweig, prominent jewelers in the Phoenix area, and the Del Webb Corporation in Phoenix. In 1983, the property was sold to Canadian entrepreneur Jack Kent Cooke, and was subsequently renamed Kent Plaza. In 1985, Kent Plaza was sold to Merrill Lynch Hubbard, a real-estate subsidiary of Merrill Lynch, Pierce, Fenner & Smith. Merrill Lynch subsequently renamed the complex Phoenix City Square. In 1987 Merrill Lynch invested heavily in refreshing the property, heavily renovating the exteriors of all three towers, the plaza, and the landscaping. The redesign was designed by Cornoyer-Hendrick Architects and Planners, Inc. and the renovation was completed by Kitchell Contractors, Inc.

The past couple decades have seen a lot of activity around the City Square development. In 1996, the Singapore government went into escrow for the purchase of City Square. At the time the Phoenix metropolitan area was experiencing drastic increases in commercial tenancy rates. In 2000, the government of Singapore sold Phoenix City Square to the Praedium Group.

In 2005 the present owner, Parallel Capital Partners (then part of the Shidler Group), purchased the complex from Praedium Group. At the time, the construction of another tower was considered; however this never did materialize, which is a possible result of the real estate downturn. Parallel Capital Partners maintains properties in San Diego, Phoenix, Los Angeles, Orange County, Dallas, Denver, and Honolulu.

In 2006, The Arizona Department of Economic Security signed a lease at City Square for a near 6-year tenancy. The deal was worth around $9.5 million and included approximately 100,000 square feet (9,300 m^{2}) of office space. DES chose the 4000 Tower for its location. In 2007, a news release noted that the Arizona DES had extended their lease and increased office space to nearly 140,000 square feet.

=== 3800 Tower ===
3800 Tower, formerly the Del Webb Building, was the first structure in the complex completed, and is located at 3800 N. Central Ave. The tower offers approximately 175,000 square feet of rentable space. The basic construction loan was furnished by Massachusetts Mutual Life Insurance Company and Coldwell Banker was the building leasing agent. The principal tenant is the Webb Corporation which houses its international headquarters for construction, housing, building and operating hotels in the building.

Webb’s offices occupy 50,000 square feet on the top six floors of the tower. On the ground floor was a branch of the First National Bank of Arizona, a Rosenzweig jewelry store and other business firms. The jewelry store moved to the adjacent open-air retail plaza in 1971. The office structure is rectangular, with all utility rooms, elevators and stairs built around a central core. This permits all offices to have outside windows. There are no interior columns to restrict space layouts. The exterior originally used precast stone and mosaic tile panels and trim of gold anodized aluminum. Ground was broken on the tower on June 20, 1961 and it was completed by June 1962.

The building featured a 54 by 20-foot spray fountain and marble facing on the first 2 floors. The building was renamed the 3800 Tower on October 28, 1987 following the Webb Corporation’s decision to move their headquarters from the building in 1988. The 3800 tower was radically redesigned in 1987, with the stone and mosaic tiles panels and aluminum trim removed and replaced with a new marble and blue glass exterior. The rooftop of the tower was topped with a new pyramid-shaped metal trellis crown. The front spray fountain was removed in favor of a grand new entrance with additional retail shops and a prominent clock tower. The original appearance of the structure was identical to the Bank of the West Tower in Albuquerque, New Mexico also built by Webb.

3800 is the smallest of the office towers in City Square, coming in under 200,000 square feet (19,000 m^{2}). It contains an attached day care, and it is located directly on Central Avenue. 3800 Tower has a variety of businesses, such as Just Mortgage Inc., The Valley Forward Association, Law Offices of Michael Cordova, PMA Consultants, Black, Gould & Associates, Inc. and Maricopa County Legal Advocate.

=== 4000 Tower ===
4000 Tower, formerly Kent Tower, the Ramada Townehouse and Dell Webb’s Townehouse, at 4000 N. Central Ave. is a 23-story combination executive hotel and office building. The skyscraper started construction in midsummer 1963 and was completed by February 1965. It featured 275 hotel rooms occupying 9 floors of the 23-story tower as well the adjoining 3-story cabana wing. The uppermost 12 floors of the tower were leased as office space.

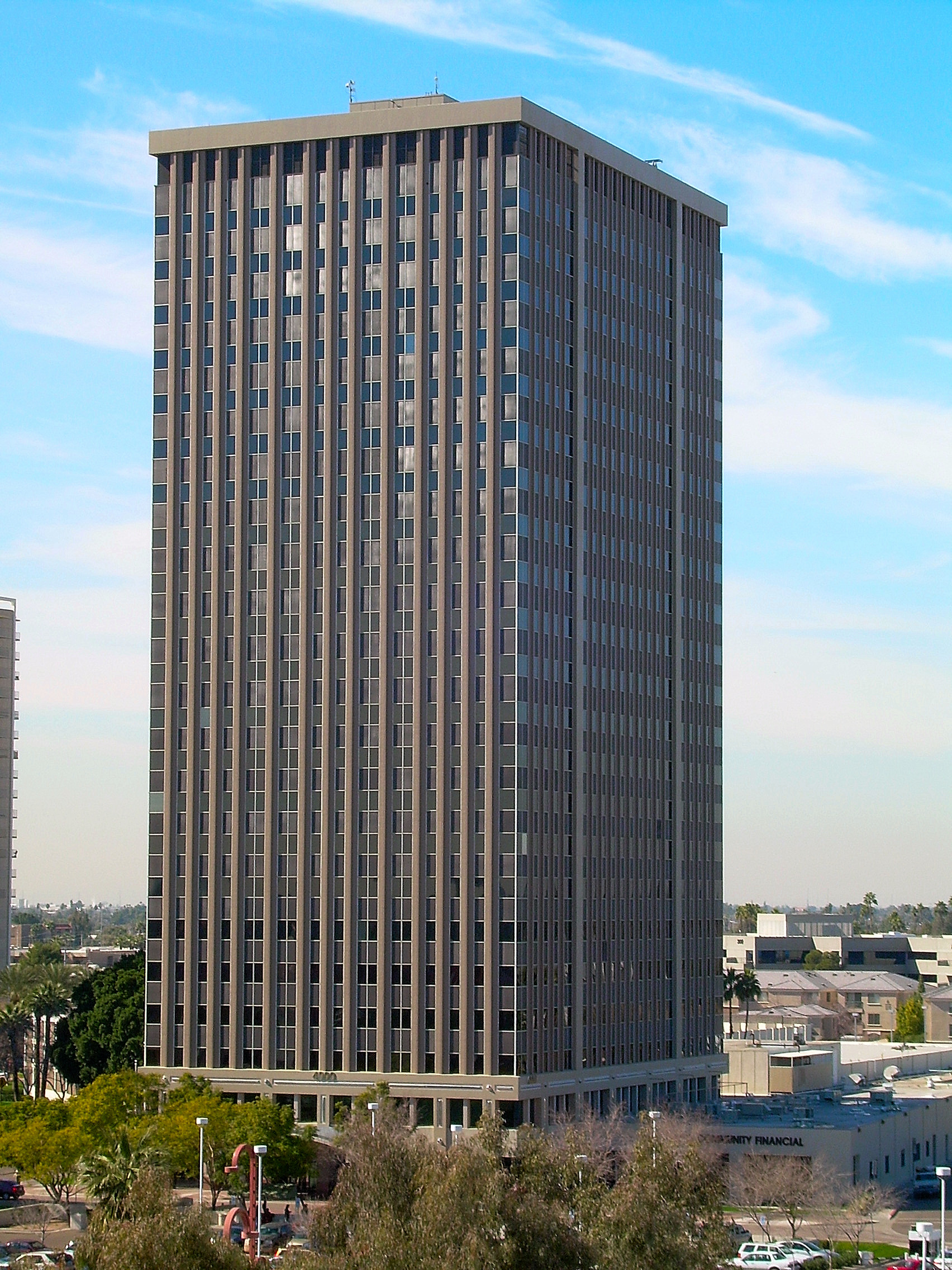
4000 Tower

When built, the guestrooms featured individual guest controlled air conditioning and heating, and telephones equipped with message-reminder service, and balconies overlooking the swimming pool in cabana wing rooms. The structure included the largest hotel convention facilities in the city, including the Los Conquistadores Ballroom to seat 2,000 diners or 3,000 persons for theater style meetings. A seven-level 1,200-car parking was provided for the new building. The building was white and gold and similar in appearance to the Del Webb Building.

The bottom two floors of the tower incorporated a drug store, gift shop, men’s store, beauty salon, barber shop, the Aztec Room restaurant seating 250 persons, coffee shop for 150 and Aztec lounge, with entertainment stage, to accommodate 140 patrons. The entire hotel was comprehensively renovated in 1978. During the renovation, all public spaces were refreshed and the Aztec Room and Lounge was transformed into the new Saguaro Room and Saloon. A new hotel tower was also constructed south of the pool, bringing the total room count to 383. In July 1981, Ramada Inns took over management of the property from the Webb Corporation and it was subsequently renamed the Ramada townhouse. Ramada had initially intended to remodel the property as a Ramada Renaissance property; however, these plans did not come to fruition.

Ramada ceased managing the property on October 31, 1983. Management was turned over to LaMancha Racquet Club Inc. in November 1983. LaMancha closed the property for renovation and reopened in July 1984 as the LaMancha Athletic Club and Hotel. During the renovation the rooms and facilities in the 23-story tower were removed and replaced with office space, lowering the room count to 171. The ballroom was converted into the LaMancha Athletic Club, featuring racquetball courts, a basketball court, Nautilus Conditioning room and an indoor swimming pool. With the opening of the LaMancha, the overall building was renamed Kent Tower. It ceased using the name Kent Tower in late 1986 and was renamed 4000 tower in 1987. The exterior of the structure was redesigned in 1987, along with the rest of the complex.

Management of the hotel facilities was turned over to the Hotel Group of Seattle in 1990 and was renamed the City Square Hotel and Athletic Club. In June 1992, management was turned over to Lexington Hotel Suites and Inns of Irving, Texas and the hotel was again renamed the Lexington Hotel and City Square Sport Club. Hotel management changed for a final time in 2003, and the property was renamed the Hilton Garden Inn. Since then, the City Square Sports Club has been managed independently from the hotel. 4000 is the tallest tower in City Square, and has been noted on the List of tallest buildings in Phoenix, which lists 25 Skyscrapers in the city. Businesses inside 4000 Tower include Arizona Drug Screening & Investigations, First Community Financial Corporation, and Parsons & Goltry Law Firm. 4000 Tower is on the north side of Clarendon Avenue, whereas both 3800 and 3838 are on the southern side.

=== Continental National Bank and Pepsi-Cola Management Institute ===
In 1965 a standalone building was built on Central Ave. directly east of the 4000 Tower. As the headquarters of the Continental National Bank. The two story building had marble facing and a precast concrete waffle roof. In 1968 a new three story structure was constructed directly north of the Continental Bank building for Pepsi-Cola as their Management Institute. The building housed classrooms, an auditorium, a library, and a closed circuit television system. In the late 1990s both the Continental Bank and Pepsi buildings were demolished and replaced with a parking lot.

=== 3838 Tower and City Square Plaza ===
3838 Tower, formerly Greyhound Tower, located at 3838 N. Central Ave., and City Square Plaza were the final phase of Phoenix City Square and were completed in April 1971. The 20-story structure was the headquarters of the Greyhound Corporation, who occupied 14 floors in the building.

The open air plaza is the centerpiece of the complex and features a retail structure connecting the 3838 Tower to 3800 Tower. Among the original tenants of the plaza was Rosenzweig jewelers, which originally opened in the lobby of the Del Webb Building in 1962 before moving to the plaza at its opening in 1971. The jeweler eventually closed. The tower and the plaza were both heavily renovated in 1987 along with the rest of the complex. In 1991 Greyhound Corporation moved to a new facility and the building was renamed 3838 Tower.
