= Heard Building =

Building in Arizona, United States

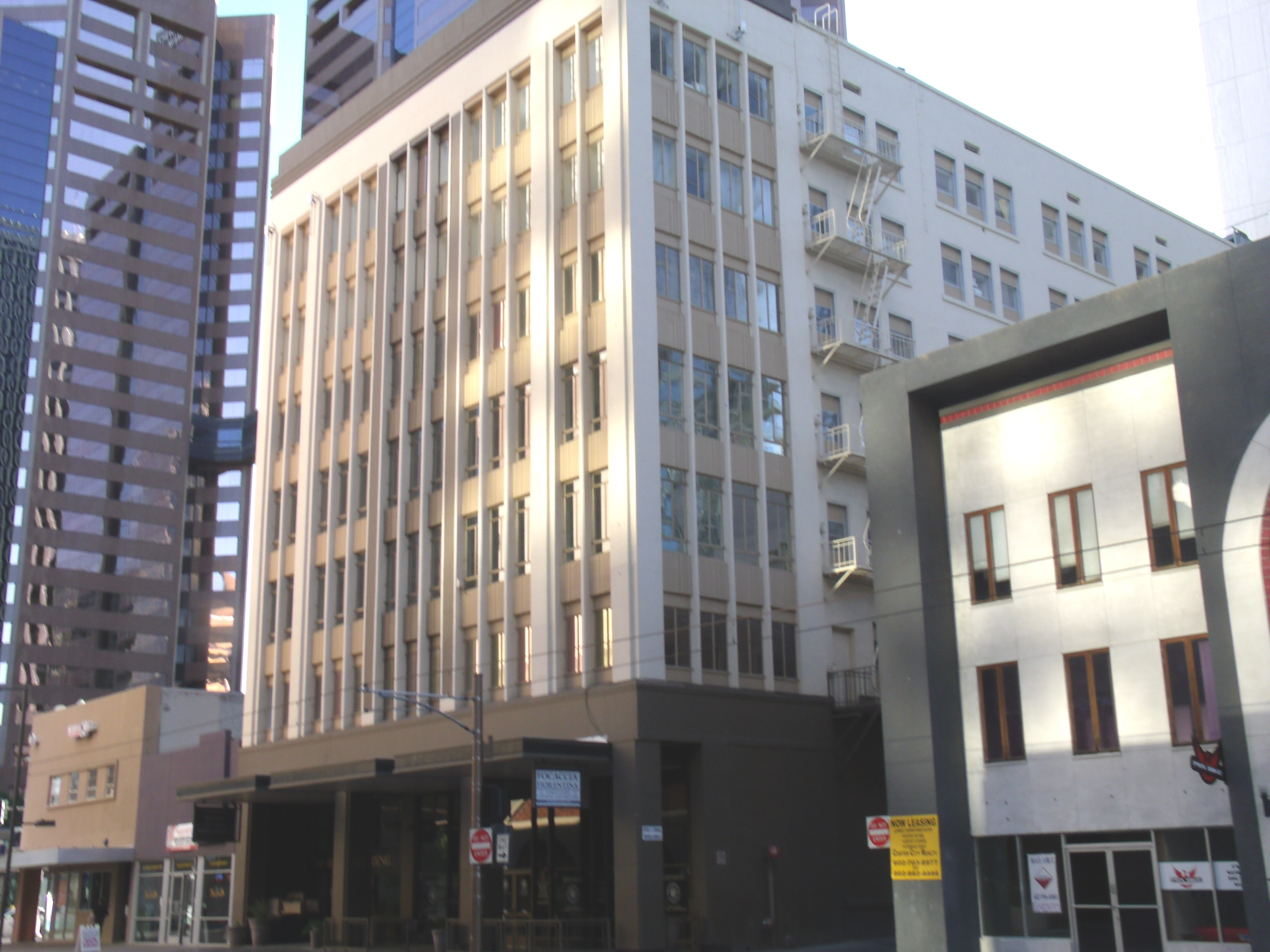
- North of the Heard Building looking southwest down Central

- Location within Arizona

General information
- Type: Store / Office
- Location: 112 N. Central Avenue Phoenix, Arizona, United States
- Coordinates: 33.4497°N 112.0733°W
- Construction started: September 02, 1919
- Opened: December 28, 1920
- Renovated: 1937

Height
- Roof: 93' 4 1/2"

Technical details
- Floor count: 8
- Lifts/elevators: 3

Design and construction
- Architect: Llewellyn A. Parker
- Main contractor: James William Martin

Renovating team
- Architect: Lescher & Mahoney
- Main contractor: William Peper Construction Company
- Heard Building
- U.S. National Register of Historic Places
- Architect: Llewellyn A. Parker
- MPS: Phoenix Commercial MRA (AD)
- NRHP reference No.: 85002059
- Added to NRHP: September 4, 1985

The Heard Building (alternatively the Greater Arizona Savings Building) is a 7-story high-rise building in Phoenix, Arizona, United States, it housed the offices of The Arizona Republic (formerly the Arizona Republican) and the Phoenix Gazette from 1920 to 1948. The building was constructed between 1919 and 1920 and was the first high-rise building to be erected in Phoenix. It held the title of tallest building in Arizona for four years until the completion of the Luhrs Building in 1924.

== History ==
Construction of the building began on September 2, 1919, and was financed by Dwight B. Heard and the Commonwealth Investment Company as a new home for his investment and publishing ventures. The building was designed by Llewellyn Adelbert Parker, an architect formerly associated with Mayberry & Parker, who designed several other structures in the valley including the Central Avenue Bridge, the Goodrich Building, and the Goldberg Building.

General contracting was awarded to James William Martin who supervised the buildings construction. Contracting for plumbing, heating and ventilation was awarded to D. S. Horrall Company and the plans for heating and ventilation were drawn by Elliott Lee Ellingwood, consultant engineer. The building was plastered with cement by Scottish contractor Duncan MacDonald and a crew of eight men. It took them eight months to complete.

In the wake of a devastating 1910 fire that consumed the Adams Hotel, Heard committed to constructing all future projects out of concrete to reduce the chance of fire. The Heard Building is no exception. The entire frame of the building is reinforced concrete and although several minor fires were reported over the years, they were extinguished quickly with minimal damage.

The Heard building was sold in December 1951, to a group of New York investors for $710,000.

== Arizona Republic and Phoenix Gazette ==
When the building opened in 1920 offices of the Arizona Republican occupied most of the first floor and portions of the basement for printing press equipment. In 1930 the Arizona Publishing Company, parent company of the Arizona Republic, purchased the Phoenix Gazette and moved its employees into the offices of the Republican of the first floor.

Both newspaper publications were sold in 1946 to Eugene C. Pulliam and in 1948 they were moved to new headquarters.

== Remodeling ==
In December 1937 a reconstruction project was launched to modernize the facade and expand the offices of the Arizona Republic and Phoenix Gazette. The offices of the Dwight B. Heard Investment Company were moved from the first floor to the third floor to make way for the expansion. William Peper Construction Company was awarded the contract. The project was directed by E. W. Larson, general manager of the Commonwealth Investment Company, and William Peper. Architectural plans were drawn by Lescher and Mahoney with reconstruction expected to take 60 days. The buildings original elevators were replaced with modern automatic leveling elevators and the air conditioning system was upgraded the previous year.

== Radio station KTAR ==
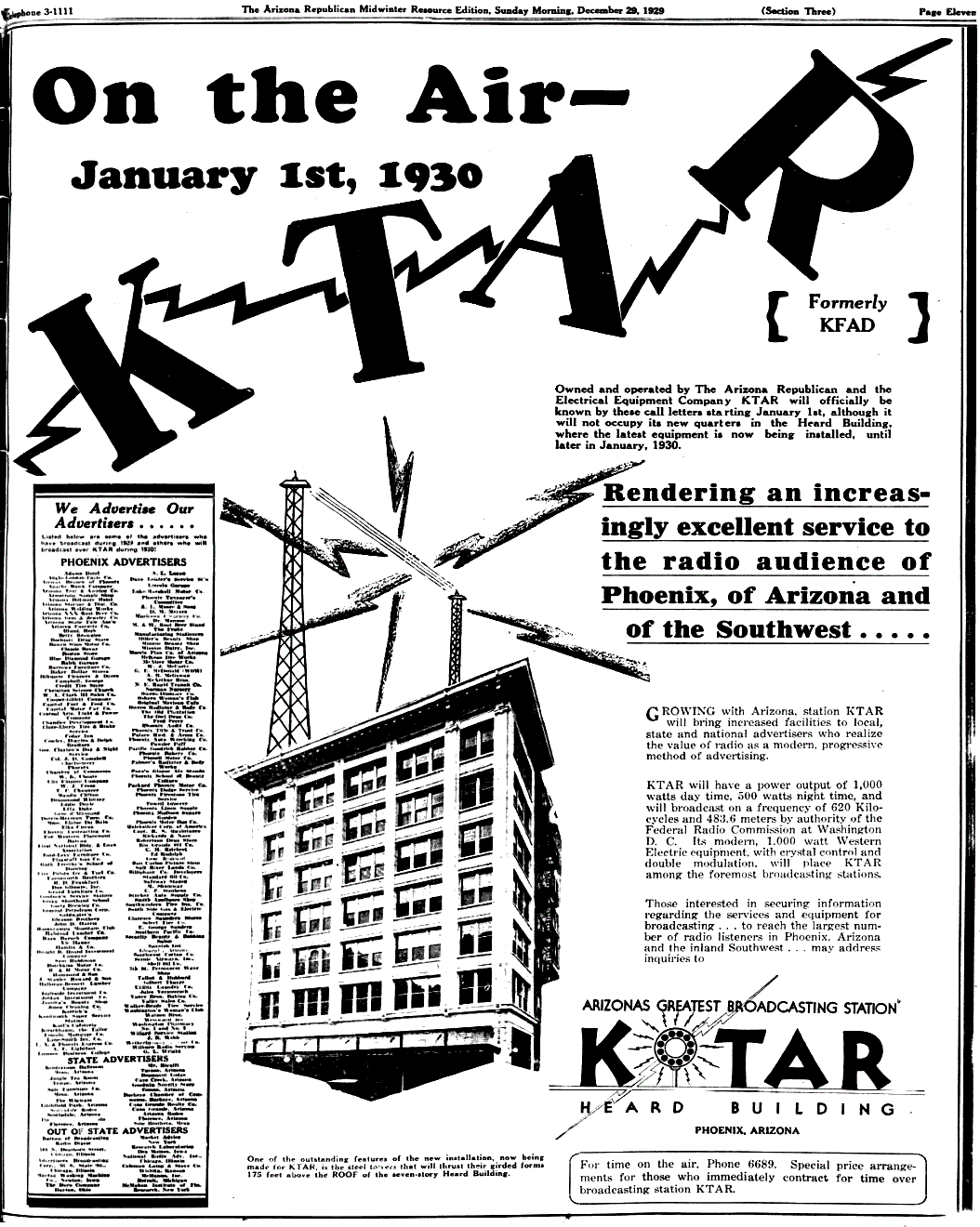
KTAR moved to the Heard Building in 1930.

In September 1929 it was announced that the Arizona Republican newspaper and the Electrical Equipment Company of Phoenix had filed articles of incorporation creating the KAR Broadcasting Company, which intended to take over and upgrade radio station KFAD. Ownership was transferred to the new company in November 1929, and in December the company received permission to change the call sign to KTAR (Keep Taking Arizona Republican), which it began using on January 1, 1930.

In conjunction with the ownership change, the station's studios and transmitter were relocated to the Heard Building. A 1000-watt Western Electric transmitter was installed on the 7th floor and two 180 ft (55 m) towers were installed on the roof to support the antenna. Demand increased, and in 1941 KTAR moved to a new 5000-watt transmitter plant at 36th Street and Thomas Road, although operations were still run from atop the Heard Building. This station was purchased by advertiser John J. Louis, Sr. of Chicago, Illinois in 1944, and the studio was eventually moved to a new location in the early fifties.

== Gallery ==
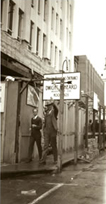

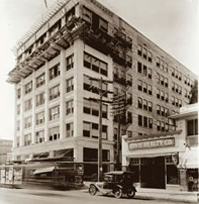

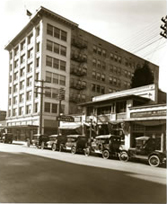

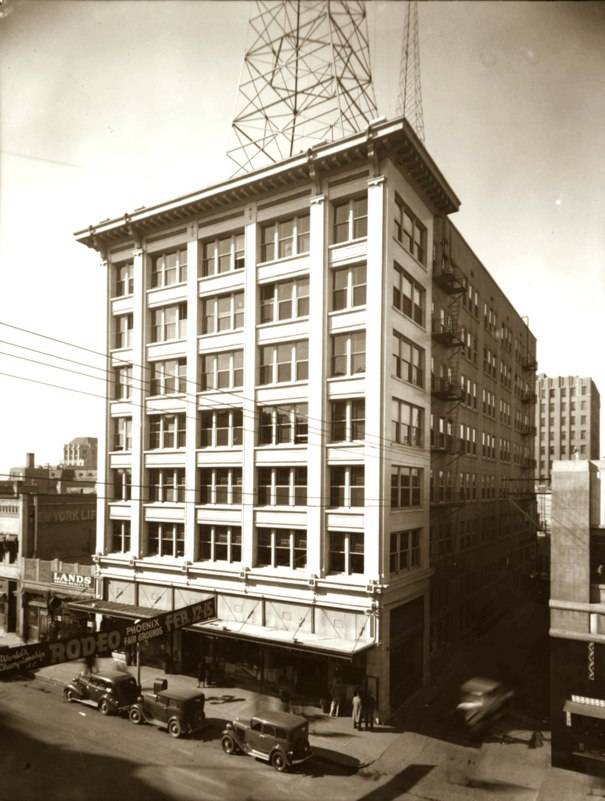

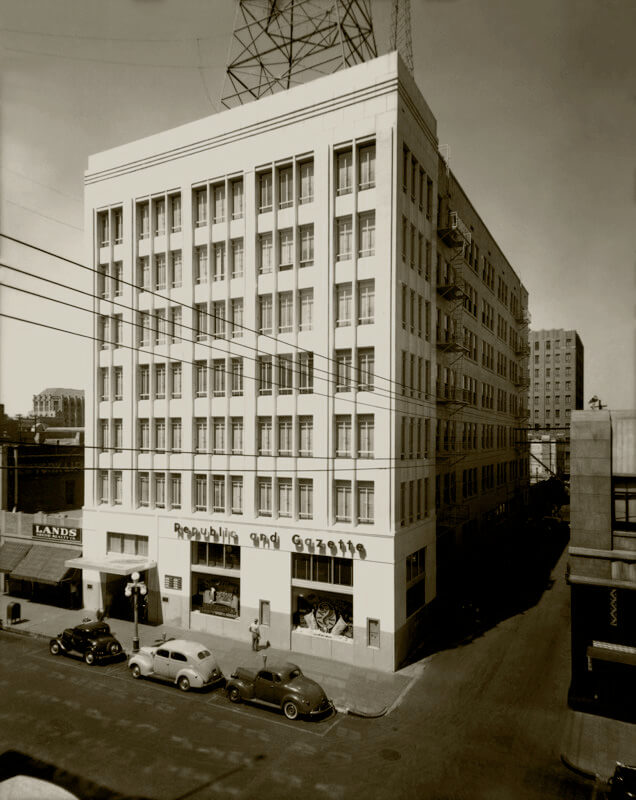

== Popular culture ==
The building can be seen in the opening sequence of the 1960 Alfred Hitchcock film Psycho. The clip fades in centered on Hotel San Carlos, which is located on the northwest corner of Central and Monroe. You can see the former Arizona Bank Building under-construction just west of Hotel San Carlos; this building was demolished in 2005 to make way for the new 44 Monroe building. Camelback Mountain can be seen in the background. When the camera pans to the right you can see the Heard Building in the foreground with its antenna; behind the Heard Building you can see the Professional Building.

In 1922 Bill Strother, the "Human Spider", climbed the face of the building and sat on top of the flagpole

In February 2018, the Swiss artists duo NEVERCREW was requested to realize a series of mural paintings on the walls of the building. The three murals are called "El oso plateado and the machine" and are intended as a tribute to the past of the building and to the extinct Mexican grizzly.

Preceded by Arizona State Capitol	Tallest Building in Phoenix; 1920—1924; 102 ft (31 m)	Succeeded by Luhrs Building
