= 111 West Monroe =

Coordinates: 33°27′0.5″N 112°4′32.5″W

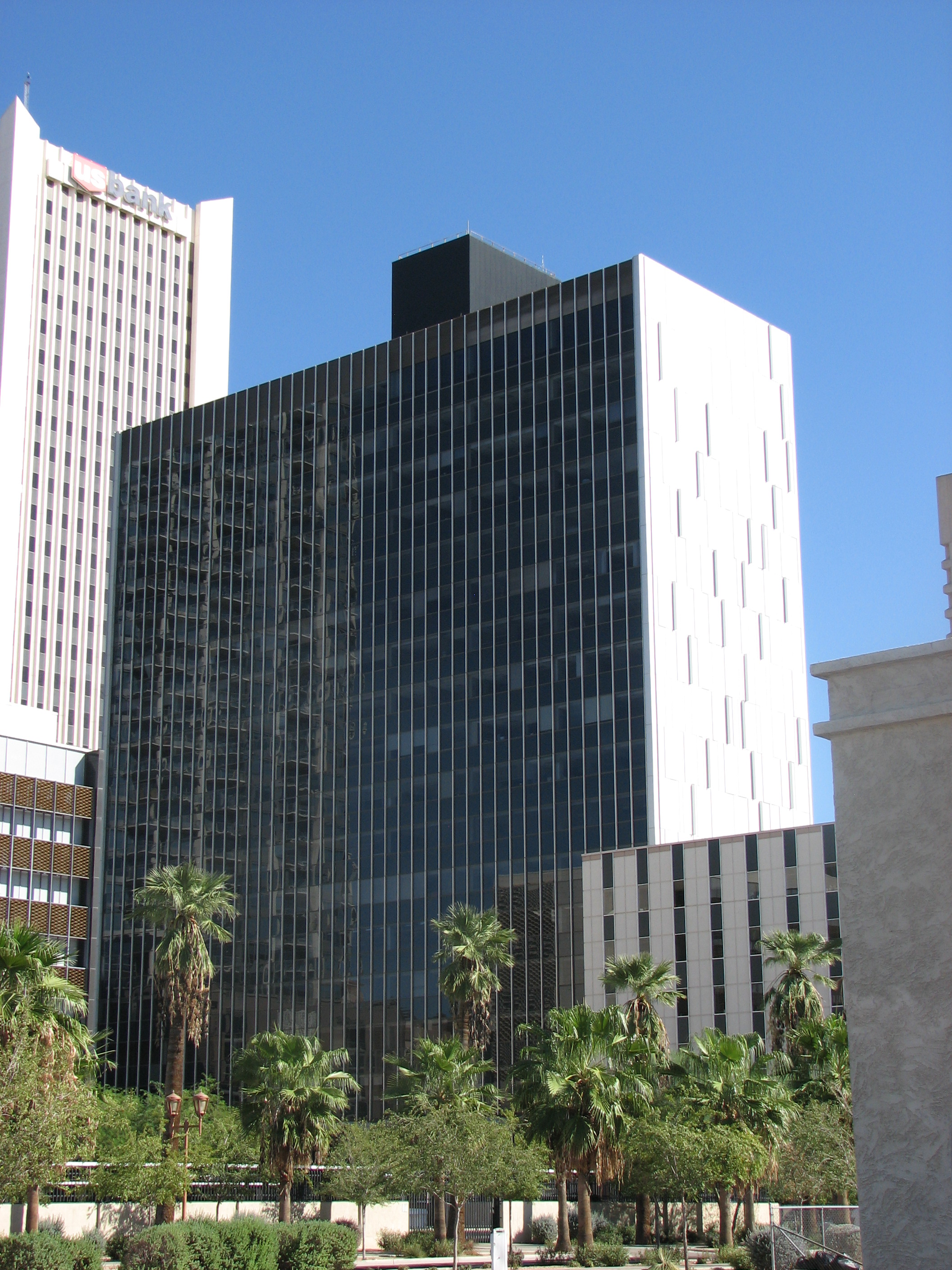
- Interactive map of the 111 West Monroe area
- Former names: Arizona Title Building, First American Title Building
- Alternative names: The Monroe

General information
- Location: Phoenix, Arizona, 111 W Monroe Street
- Completed: 1964

Height
- Height: 247 ft (75 m)

Technical details
- Floor count: 18

Design and construction
- Architect: Weaver & Drover
- Main contractor: Chanen Construction Company

111 West Monroe also known as The Monroe (formerly known as First American Title Building and Arizona Title Building) is an 18-story office building located in downtown Phoenix, Arizona. The building opened in 1964 as the Arizona Title Building.

== History ==
Opened in 1964, the building was originally home to the Arizona Title and Trust Co. The local architecture firm of Weaver & Drover designed the building in the International Style. The architects wanted to implement the ideas of famed architect Mies van der Rohe that the true structure of the building should be expressed clearly on the exterior. Due to local building codes requiring all structural steel to be encased in fireproof material, this was not possible. The architects thus used Bronze-anodized aluminum mullions that run vertically between the windows to imply the structure within. The north and south sides of the building feature windows separated by vertical mullions. The east and west sides feature solid walls clad in over 8,000,000 1-inch gold tiles. The tiles took over three weeks to install and required intense hand labor. The lobby featured Brazilian terrazzo floors, columns covered in black Italian marble, and wall sculptures created by local artist Paul Coze. The offices featured walnut wood paneling and matching walnut desks. The general contractor was Chanen Construction Company of Phoenix. The project co-owners were Louis Himmelstein and Milton Bochat of the Del Monte Company and Herman Chanen, owner of Chanen Construction. Financing for construction was provided by the Prudential Insurance Company.

The building later changed hands with First American Title becoming the anchor tenant.

On the afternoon of April 23, 1983, two workmen were refinishing wood wall paneling in law offices on the 10th floor. The Shellac being used to refinish the wood came in close contact with a taped-off electrical outlet which sparked and caused a minor explosion that blew out several windows. The men attempted to put the fire that the explosion created using a fire hose but was unsuccessful. The fire grew to be a four-alarm blaze, and 28 of the Phoenix Fire Department's 36 units were called. The fire was brought under control at around 6:15 PM that evening. The building had a fire alarm system that had to be activated by flipping a switch. The alarm was not activated until after the fire had spread. The building only had fire sprinklers in the lobby and parking garage. In total, the fire cost around $8 Million in damage to the building, and 18 firefighters had to be treated for smoke inhalation. No fatalities occurred.

The building was sold in 1996 and again in 1998 to Sundiance Tower. In the early 2000s the 1-inch gold tiles on the east and west sides of the building were covered with metal panels and an LED light display designed by local architect Will Bruder. It then became known as the One11 Tower. In 2007 the building was sold to BCL, Inc. of San Diego for $40 Million. Kellwood Company purchased the building in 2025. CBRE Group handles leasing. In recent years the building has been praised for its architectural significance and mid century inspired renovations have taken place. The building has even been called the Phoenix equivalent of the Seagram Building in New York City.

== See also ==
- List of tallest buildings in Phoenix
- List of tallest buildings in Arizona
