= BMO Tower (Phoenix) =

Highrise in Phoenix, Arizona

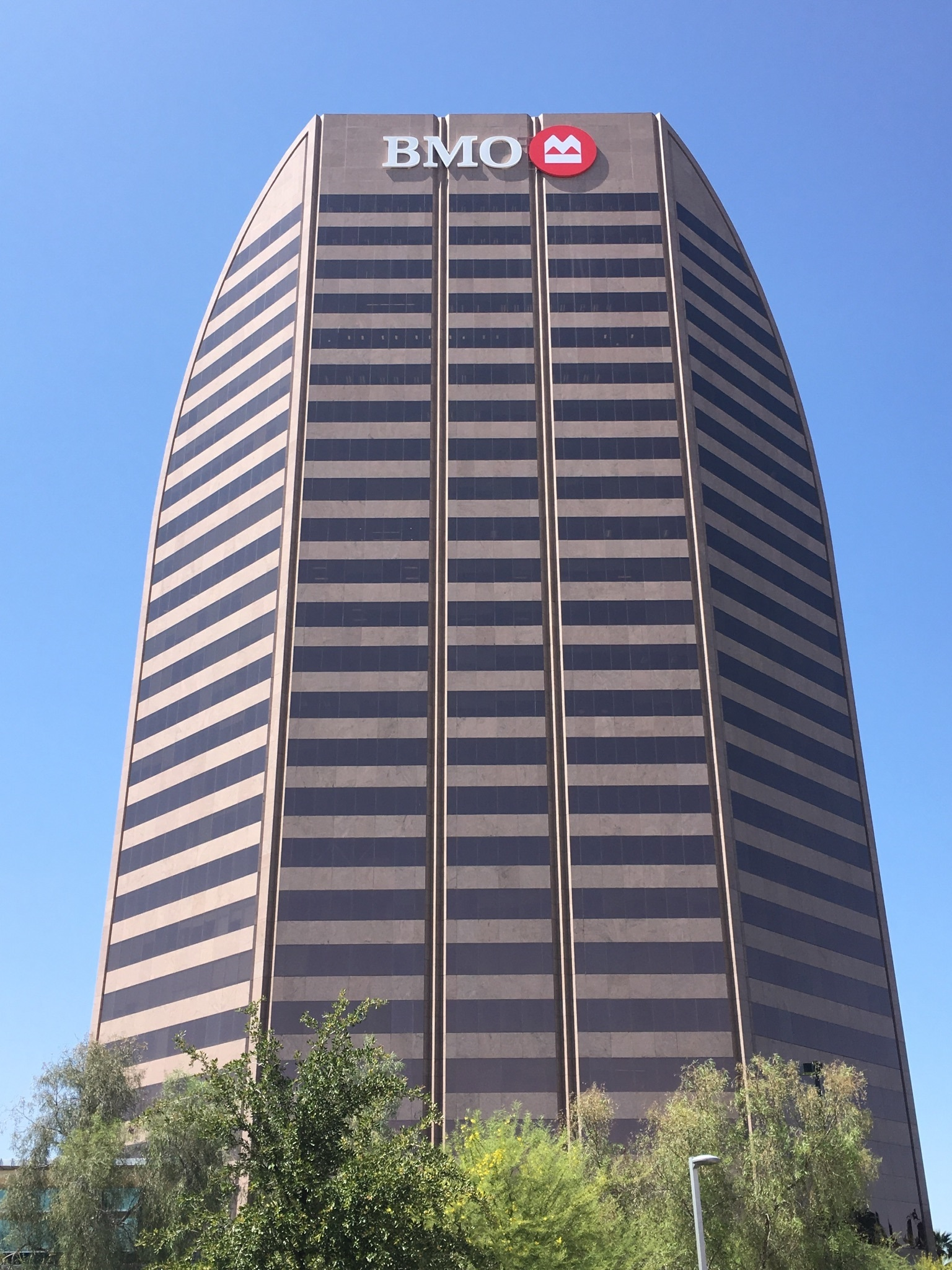
- Looking up at the BMO Tower in July, 2016.
- Interactive map of the BMO Tower area

General information
- Status: Completed
- Location: Midtown Phoenix; Phoenix
- Coordinates: 33.4683°N 112.0746°W
- Completed: 1991

Height
- Roof: 374 ft (114 m)

Technical details
- Floor count: 24
- Floor area: 483,741 sq ft (44,941.0 m^{2})

Design and construction
- Architect: HKS, Inc.
- Developer: Greyhound Reality Corp.
- Main contractor: HuntCor Inc.

The BMO Tower is a highrise in Midtown Phoenix, Arizona, also known as the Viad Corporate Center and formerly the Dial Tower. The tower was constructed in 1991 for the Dial Corporation, which is why the building resembles a bar of Dial soap. It was previously occupied by Viad, which spun off subsidiary Dial Corporation in 1996 but since 2016, the Bank of Montreal (BMO) has occupied one floor of the 483,741 sq ft (44,941.0 m^{2}) building. It rises 374 feet (114 meters) and 24 floors, and is currently the sixth tallest building in Phoenix.

It was designed in the modern style by HKS, Inc. Originally, the tower was supposed to have a twin, rotated 90 degrees from the current tower, but due to the Savings and Loan Crisis of the 1980s and 1990s, the second tower was dropped. Today, the BMO Tower stands as one of Phoenix's most prominent buildings. It is located across the street from the Phoenix Art Museum on Central Avenue just north of McDowell Road between Downtown Phoenix and Midtown Phoenix. The building features a large landscaped public park with many statues and fountains near the entrance. Completed in 1991, the BMO Tower was the last major skyscraper to be constructed in Midtown.

In early 2016, BMO Harris Bank, N.A. (Canada's Bank of Montreal and Chicago's Harris Bank) moved into the Viad Tower, renamed the building to BMO Tower, and had a BMO logo placed atop the mid-town tower.

== Gallery ==
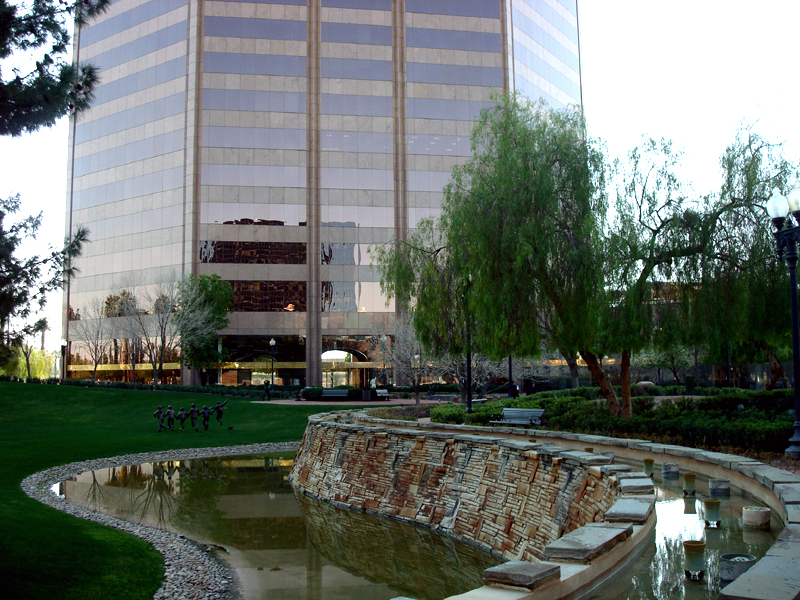

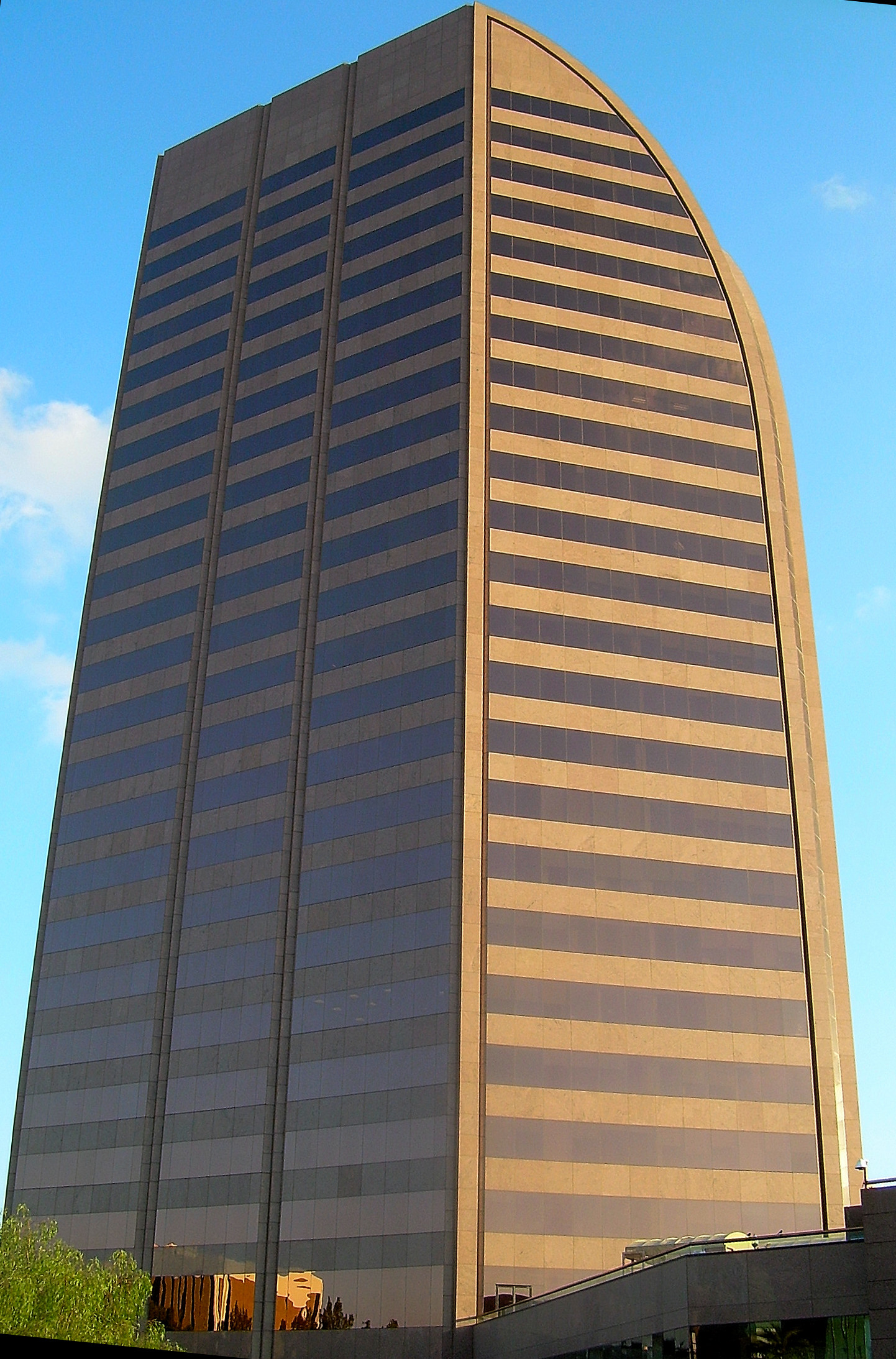

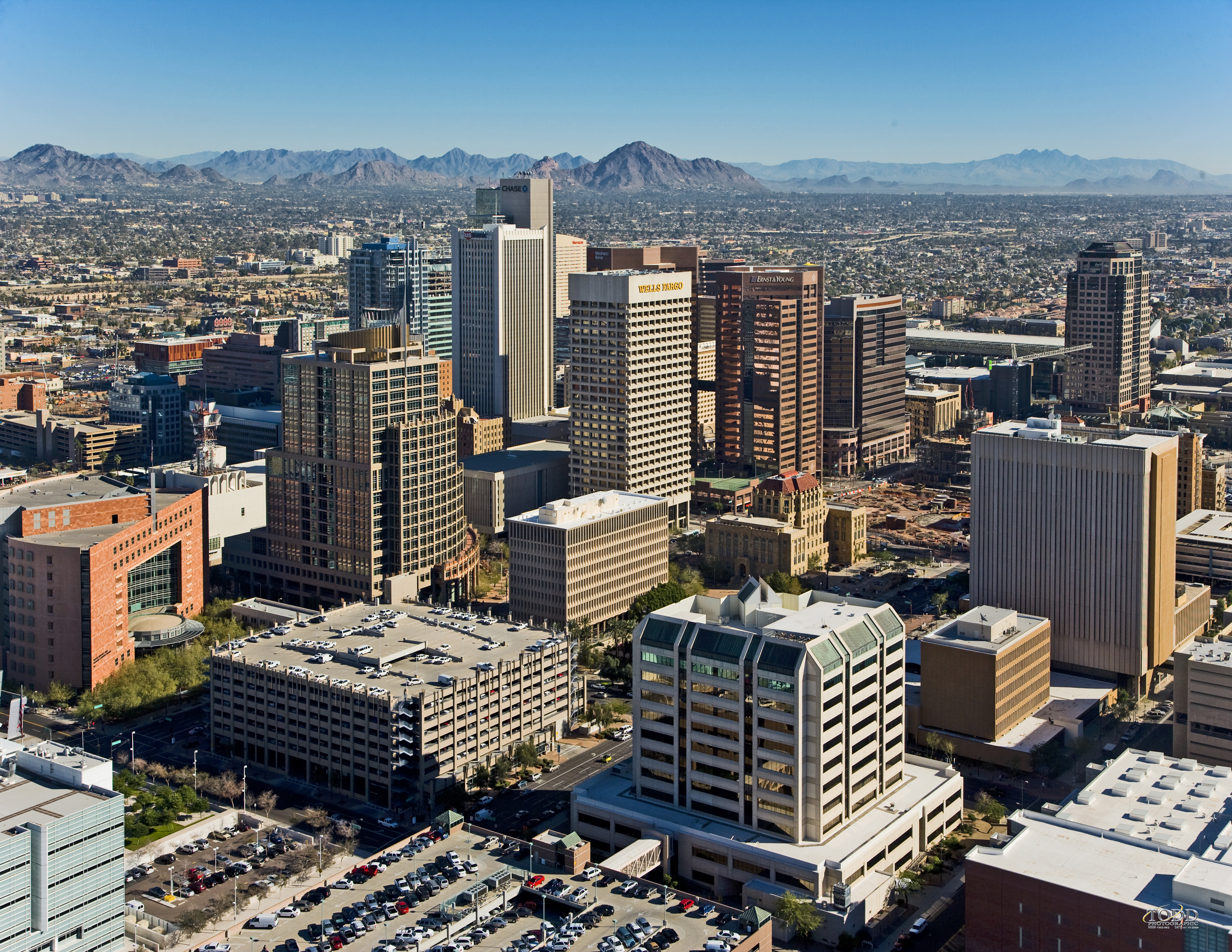

== See also ==
- Central Avenue Corridor
- Phoenix Art Museum
