= Renaissance Square =

High-rise complex in Phoenix, Arizona

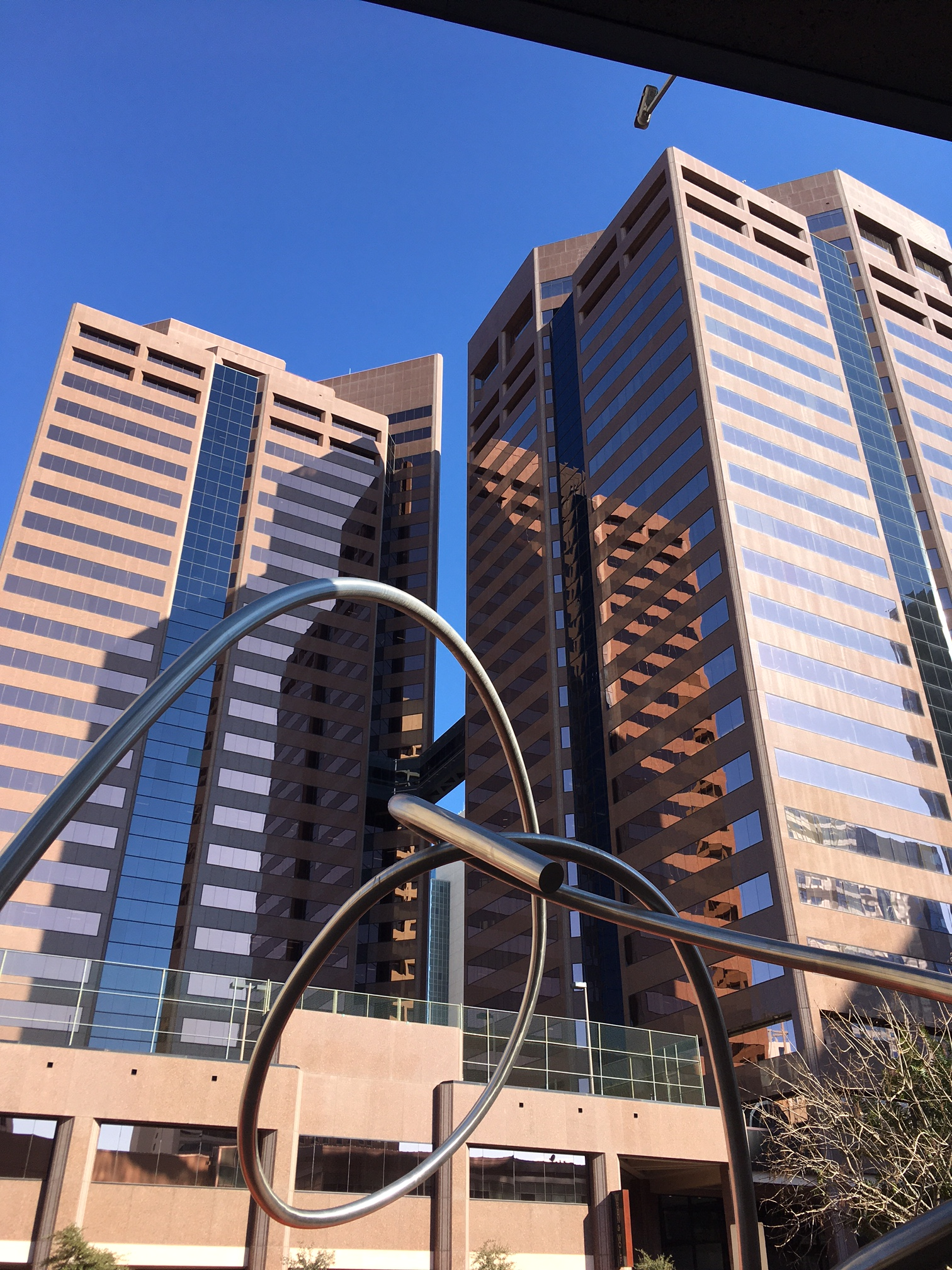
- Renaissance Square
- Interactive map of the Renaissance Square area
- Alternative names: Ren Square

General information
- Type: Commercial offices
- Location: 2 & 40 North Central Avenue; Phoenix, Arizona
- Coordinates: 33.4487°N 112.0745°W
- Completed: Tower 1: 1986; Tower 2: 1990
- Owner: Oaktree Capital Management & Cypress Office Properties
- Operator: CBRE

Height
- Roof: Tower 1: 105.77 m (347.0 ft); Tower 2: 113.39 m (372.0 ft)

Technical details
- Floor count: Tower 1: - 26; Tower 2: 28
- Floor area: 965,508 sq ft (89,698.6 m^{2})
- Lifts/elevators: 8 low rise, 10 high rise, 2 freight, 3 hydro cabs

Design and construction
- Architects: Pierce Goodwin Alexander & Linville; Emery Roth & Sons
- Developer: Trammell Crow Company

Renaissance Square is a high-rise complex located in downtown Phoenix, Arizona. The complex includes two towers: One Renaissance Square at 347 ft (106 m) with 26 floors, and Two Renaissance Square at 372 ft (113 m) with 28 floors. Although a part of the same complex, Tower 1 was completed in 1986 while Tower 2 was completed in 1990. Renaissance Square, which is composed of buildings which stand as the 7th and 15th tallest buildings in Phoenix, is entirely an office complex. The two towers are connected by a skyway positioned halfway up the structures.

Developed by Trammell Crow Company, Renaissance Square was sold to the Pauls Corporation in 2005 for US$120 million. In late 2007, the Pauls Corporation sold the complex to the Hines U.S. Core Office Fund for US$273 million. It was the second-largest commercial exchange in Phoenix in 2007. In December, 2016 Oaktree Capital Management & Cypress Office Properties purchased the towers from Hines for US$150 million. In late 2017 the project underwent over US$50 million in building renovations. Cushman & Wakefield has the listing assignment to lease the project.

Current tenants include Food for the Hungry and Upgrade, Inc..

One Renaissance Square

== See also ==
- List of tallest buildings in Phoenix
