= Phoenix Corporate Center =

High-rise in Arizona, United States

Phoenix Corporate Tower
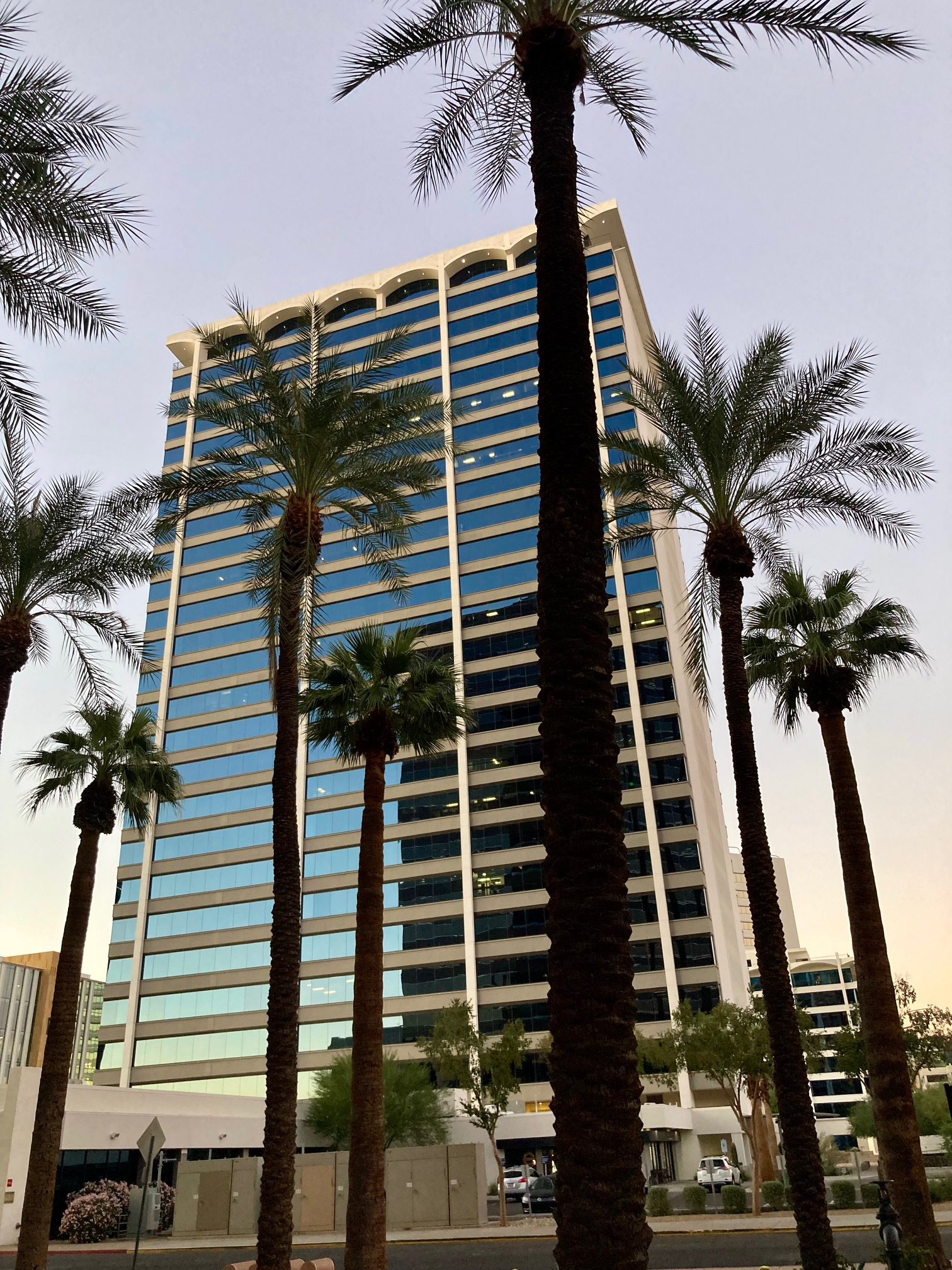
- Interactive map of the Phoenix Corporate Tower area

General information
- Status: Completed
- Type: Office
- Location: Phoenix, Arizona
- Coordinates: 33.4826°N 112.0732°W
- Construction started: 1963
- Opening: January 3, 1965
- Cost: $21 million
- Owner: Colony Capital

Height
- Roof: 341 ft (104 m)
- Top floor: 26

Technical details
- Floor count: 26
- Floor area: 445,811 sq ft (41,417 m2)
- Lifts/elevators: 9

Design and construction
- Architects: Irvin Finical & Associates
- Developer: Mayer Development Company
- Main contractor: TGK Construction Company

Website
- http://www.phoenixcorporatetower.com/

The Phoenix Corporate Tower (formerly known as First Federal Savings Building) is a 26-story high-rise office building in Phoenix, Arizona. It was built in 1965 and designed in the International Style. The tower was built two miles north of Downtown Phoenix in the Central Corridor. At that time, corporate investment turned its attention away from downtown. When the tower was completed, it was the tallest building in Phoenix, taking that distinction away from the Executive Towers Condominiums. It remained the tallest building for six years until the First National Bank Plaza was completed in 1971.

== History ==
When Phoenix Corporate Center was originally built, all north and south facing windows had balconies. There were seven columns stretching from the ground floor to the top where they formed a series of arches. Each column visually attached to its neighboring column. There was also a glass elevator on the western elevation, which served the top floor.

In 1990, San Francisco-based development firm The Krausz Companies, Inc. purchased what was then called "Prudential Plaza," and undertook an ambitious repositioning of the near-vacant office tower. Balconies were removed, and glass was reinstalled flush with the slab edge, substantially expanding the leasable interior space on each floor. Additionally, several vertical columns on the north and south facades were removed, giving the building a smoother more modern appearance. The skylift elevator is no longer functional.

In June 2013, the property was scheduled for foreclosure. The mortgage secured by the property was purchased by Colony Capital in 2013. The building was in receivership with Trident Pacific Real Estate and Colony closed on the building towards the end of the year. Colony has made significant upgrades to the property, including: renovating the lobby, painting the exterior, and building a marketing center.

Preceded by Meridian Bank Tower	Tallest Building in Phoenix; 1965—1971; 104m	Succeeded by Wells Fargo Plaza
