= Grand Central Tower (Phoenix) =

High-rise in Arizona

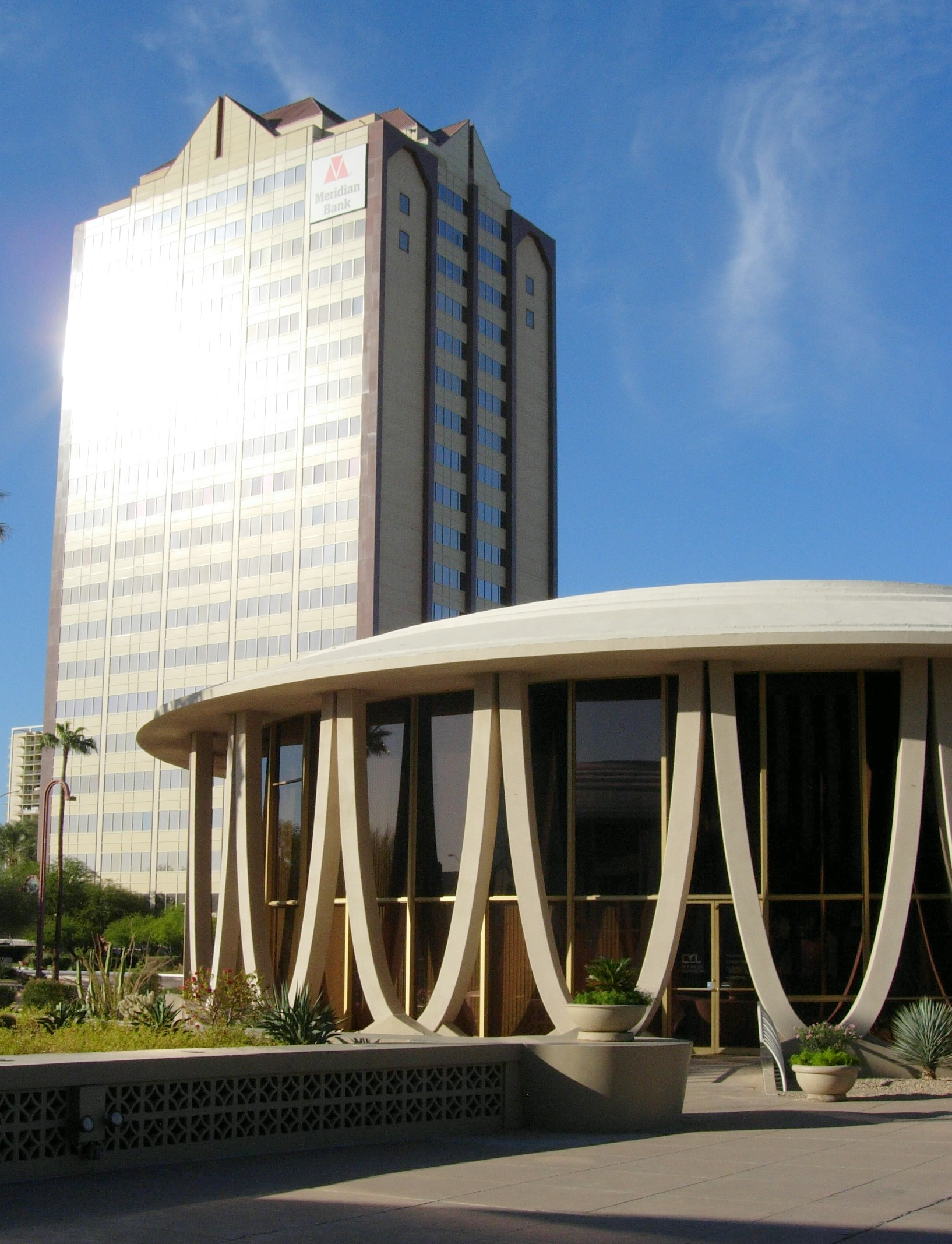
- Interactive map of the Grand Central Tower area

General information
- Type: Office
- Location: 3550 N Central Ave; Phoenix, Arizona
- Coordinates: 33.4891°N 112.0739°W
- Construction started: February 13, 1959
- Opening: March 4, 1960
- Owner: Younan Properties

Height
- Roof: 252 ft (77 m)
- Top floor: 20

Technical details
- Floor count: 20
- Floor area: 287,269 sq ft (26,105 m2)
- Lifts/elevators: 5

Design and construction
- Architect: Charles G. Polacek
- Developer: David H. Murdock
- Structural engineer: W. T. Hamlyn
- Main contractor: Henry C. Beck Company

The Grand Central Tower (originally known as the Guaranty Bank Building) is a high-rise building in Phoenix, Arizona. It is an office building designed in international style and constructed between 1959 and 1960 for developer David H. Murdock. Upon completion, it became the city's tallest building, taking that 31 year distinction away from the Westward Ho which opened in 1929. The Phoenix Corporate Center, a 26-story office building, was completed just a few years later in 1965 claiming the title as the city's tallest building. There is a 20 feet (6.1 m) by 20 feet (6.1 m) sign on the north and south sides. The exterior was remodeled in the late 1980s which substantially changed the building's appearance.

== History ==
Original plans called for an 11-story office building called the 3550 Building. Although the property was only zoned for a 4-story structure city planners approved the plans. Murdock later decided to build higher and he proposed an 18-story tower that would be the city's tallest. Plans were finalized and approved during January 1959, and groundbreaking ceremonies were held on February 13, 1959. The actual excavation began February 16, 1959. A 3,000 pounds (1,400 kg), 10 feet (3.0 m) tall, 5 feet (1.5 m) wide, 4 feet (1.2 m) thick cake replicating the building's design was presented at the groundbreaking ceremony and Murdock used a silver-plated shovel to cut the first piece of cake.

The building was topped out in December 1959. A 60-foot Christmas tree was hoisted onto the roof and decorated with lights which were turned on nightly during the holiday season. The building originally had a light blue appearance when viewed from a distance. The international style curtain wall had translucent blue glass between vertical panels of light blue glass with white backing and white trimming. The glass facade on the north and south sides were divided into five sections by six vertical columns of precast concrete cladding that covered steel framework; of those, the two corner columns were slightly wider. The east and west sides were divided by five vertical concrete columns that extruded from the building dividing the face into four equal recessed sections. The outer sections had a windowless Mo-Sai stone curtain wall and the two middle sections had a glass curtain matching the north and south sides.

=== Remodeling ===
In 1988 the building's exterior was remodeled and the light blue glass with white backing used as vertical dividers between floors was swapped for a tan non-glossy material. The Mo-Sai covering the vertical columns on the east and west side was replaced with a reddish-brown stone and a large terracotta colored pitched roof was added on top of the building for aesthetics. The building now has a tan/brown appearance.

== In popular culture ==
The January 4, 1960, edition of Newsweek Magazine featured a front-page photograph of the building during construction for an article about Phoenix titled, Rising Phoenix: 'Miracle' in Arizona.

Preceded by Westward Ho	Tallest Building in Phoenix; 1960—1965; 252 ft (77 m)	Succeeded by Phoenix Corporate Center
