= Freeport-McMoRan Center =

Skyscraper in Phoenix

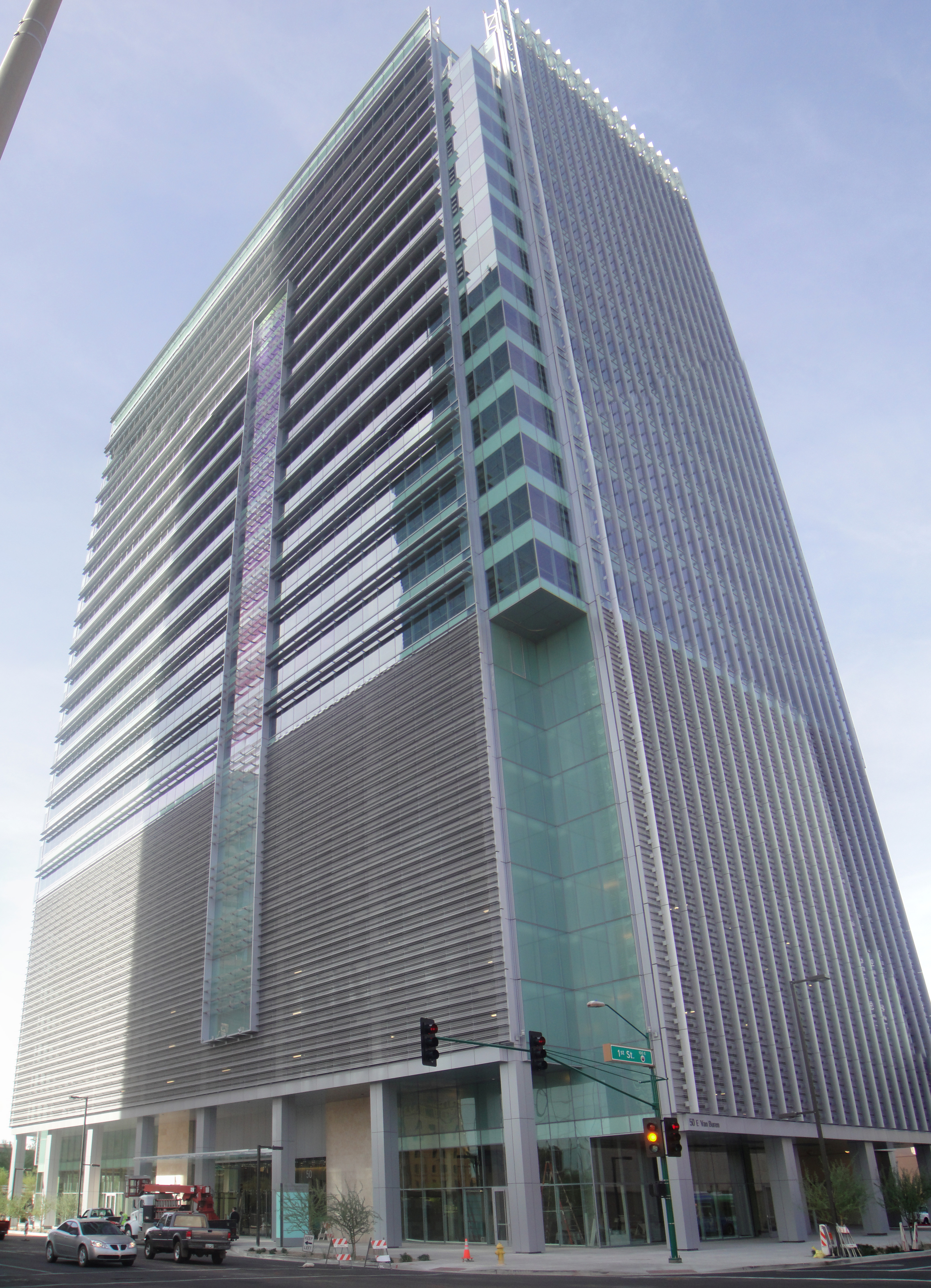
- View of the South East corner of Freeport-McMoRan Center just before its public opening in October 2009
- Interactive map of the Freeport-McMoRan Center area

General information
- Type: Office / Hotel
- Location: 333 North Central Avenue; Phoenix, Arizona 85004
- Coordinates: 33.4519°N 112.0732°W
- Construction started: October 2007
- Completed: November 2009
- Cost: US$175 million
- Owner: the National Electrical Benefit Plan

Height
- Height: 341 feet (104 m)

Technical details
- Structural system: Glass facade, steel frame, metal deck, concrete floors
- Floor count: 26
- Floor area: 30,000 sq ft (2,800 m^{2})
- Lifts/elevators: 14

Design and construction
- Architecture firm: SmithGroup
- Main contractor: Holder Construction

Freeport-McMoRan Center (formerly One Central Park East) is a highrise located in Downtown Phoenix, Arizona. It is located adjacent to Arizona State University's Downtown campus. Upon completion in 2009, the building was the first high-rise office tower to open in Downtown Phoenix in nearly eight years. It is named for mining company Freeport-McMoRan whose headquarters are located in the building.

== History ==
The tower was originally designed as a multi-use complex made up of the office tower with high-rise condominiums and academic space for the Arizona State University Downtown Phoenix campus. The plan was modified in 2006 because of money constraints and ASU's tight timetable to open the School of Journalism building by August 2008.

The project's demise forced developers to redesign the project so they could move forward on the most-needed component, the office tower, while still leaving room on the site to develop ASU space and residential housing, should either be needed in the future.

On January 27, 2009, the developers of the tower held a "topping out" ceremony celebrating that construction has reached its highest point.

In May 2010, plans were revealed to fill the first eight usable floors of the tower with a 242-room luxury Westin Hotel. On March 10, 2011 the new hotel was opened to guests. The $40 million hotel was designed and built out in less than a year in order to get it open as soon as possible. Building modification included a two-story addition on the west side of the building to accommodate a private hotel entrance, restaurant and a pool on the second floor. The original lobby was reconfigured and the elevators for the hotel were partitioned off to keep the office and hotel uses separate.

== Building Design ==
The building has ground floor retail, nine floors of above ground parking, eight floors dedicated to a Westin hotel and the uppermost eight floors with Class A office space, filled by namesake Freeport-McMoRan Copper & Gold. Each floor plate offers over 30,000 square feet (2,800 m^{2}) of column free space and 9' floor to ceiling windows of articulated glass. The glass windows are adorned with vertical and horizontal “fins” that limit the amount of sunlight entering the building during the day while still allowing clear views.

== See also ==
- List of tallest buildings in Arizona
