= Kibbey Butte =

Landform in the Grand Canyon, Arizona

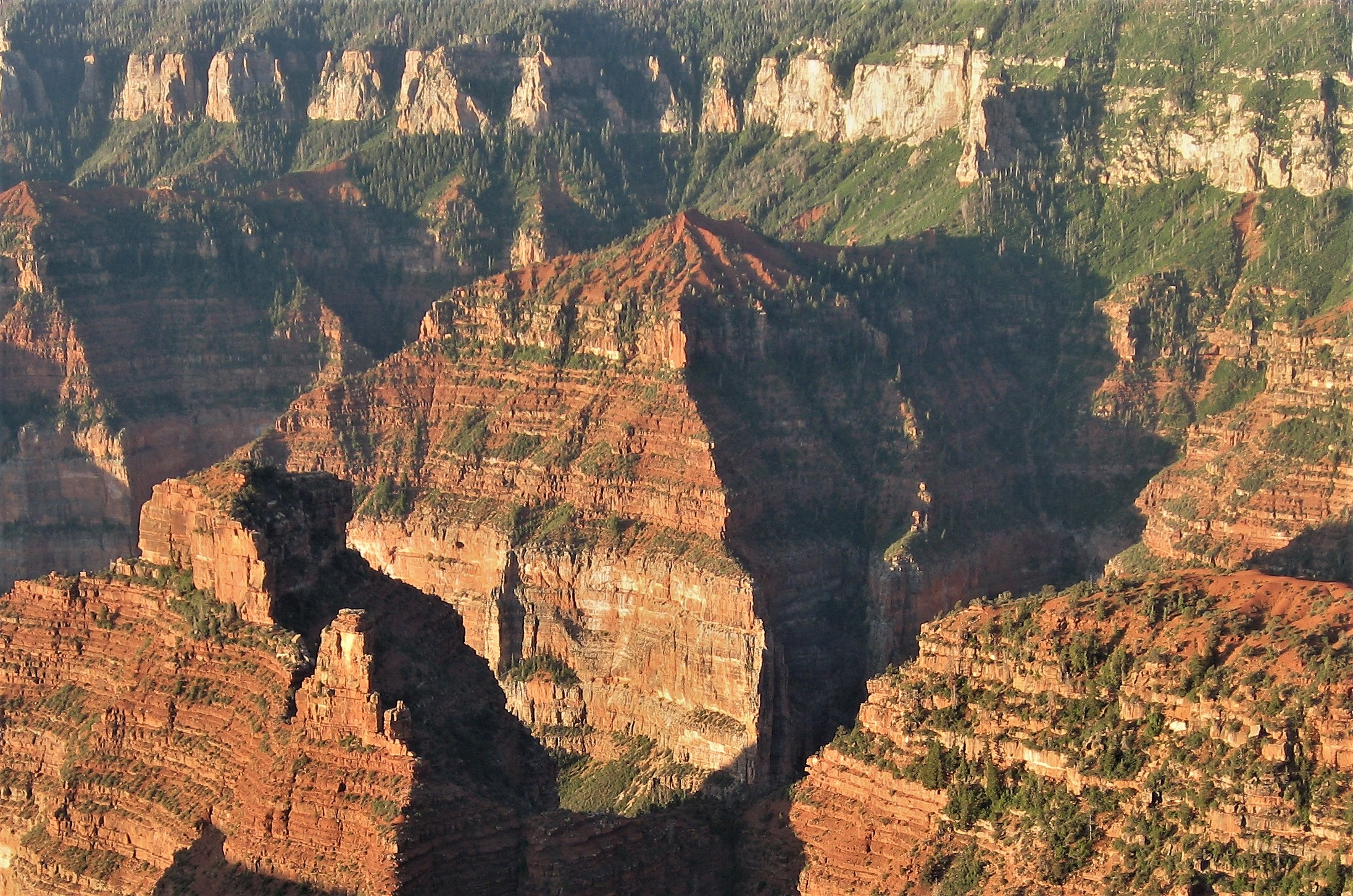
- North aspect centered, from Point Imperial

Highest point
- Elevation: 7,801 ft (2,378 m)
- Prominence: 181 ft (55 m)
- Parent peak: Brady Peak (8,121 ft)
- Isolation: 0.92 mi (1.48 km)
- Coordinates: 36°14′56″N 111°58′42″W

Naming
- Etymology: Joseph Henry Kibbey

Geography
- Location within Arizona Location within the United States
- Country: United States
- State: Arizona
- County: Coconino
- Protected area: Grand Canyon National Park
- Parent range: Kaibab Plateau; Colorado Plateau
- Topo map: USGS Walhalla Plateau

Geology
- Rock age: Permian
- Rock type(s): shale, sandstone

Climbing
- First ascent: May 31, 1961; Harvey Butchart, Allyn Cureton
- Easiest route: class 3 scrambling

Kibbey Butte is a 7,801-foot-elevation (2,378-meter) summit located in the Grand Canyon, in Coconino County of northern Arizona, US. It is situated two miles south of the Point Imperial viewpoint on the canyon's North Rim, where it towers over 3,000 feet (910 meters) above Nankoweap Canyon. Its nearest higher neighbor is Brady Peak one mile to the southeast, Hancock Butte is one mile to the north-northeast, and Alsap Butte is two miles to the east. The summit of this butte is composed of dark reddish Permian Hermit Shale overlaying the Pennsylvanian-Permian Supai Group, in turn overlaying the cliff-forming Mississippian Redwall Limestone. According to the Köppen climate classification system, Kibbey Butte is located in a cold semi-arid climate zone. Precipitation runoff from this feature drains east into the Colorado River via Nankoweap Creek. Cross-country access to Kibbey Butte starts at the parking area for Greenland Lake. The first ascent of the summit was made by Harvey Butchart and Allyn Cureton on May 31, 1961.

== Etymology ==
This geographical feature was named by Will C. Barnes after Joseph Henry Kibbey (1853–1924), an American attorney who served as Associate Justice of the Arizona Territorial Supreme Court from 1889 to 1893, and President Theodore Roosevelt appointed Kibbey as the Governor of Arizona Territory, serving from 1905 to 1909. He was an authority on Arizona water laws. This geographical feature's name was officially adopted in 1932 by the U.S. Board on Geographic Names.

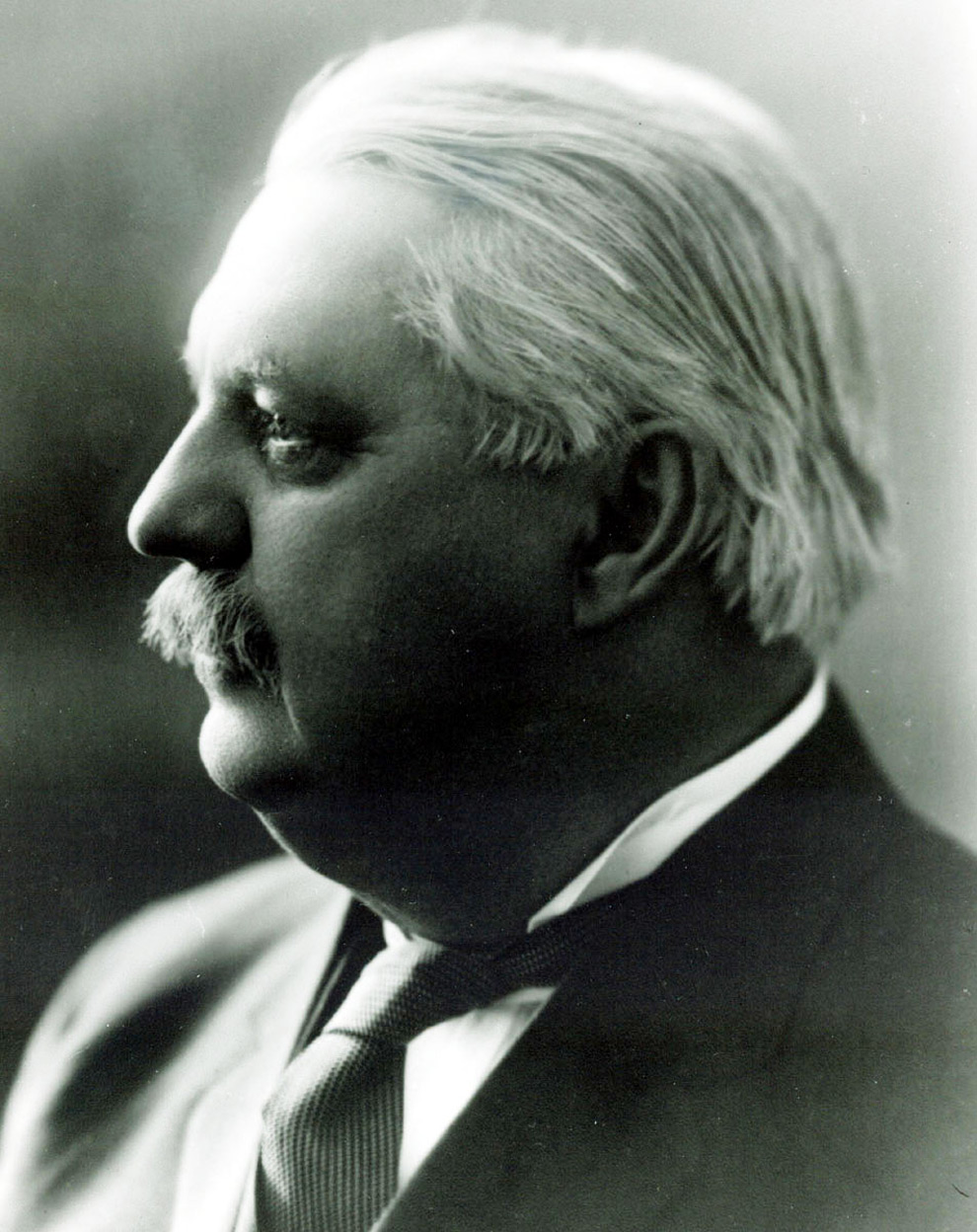
Joseph H. Kibbey (c. 1913)

== See also ==
- Geology of the Grand Canyon area
