= Brady Peak =

Landform in the Grand Canyon, Arizona

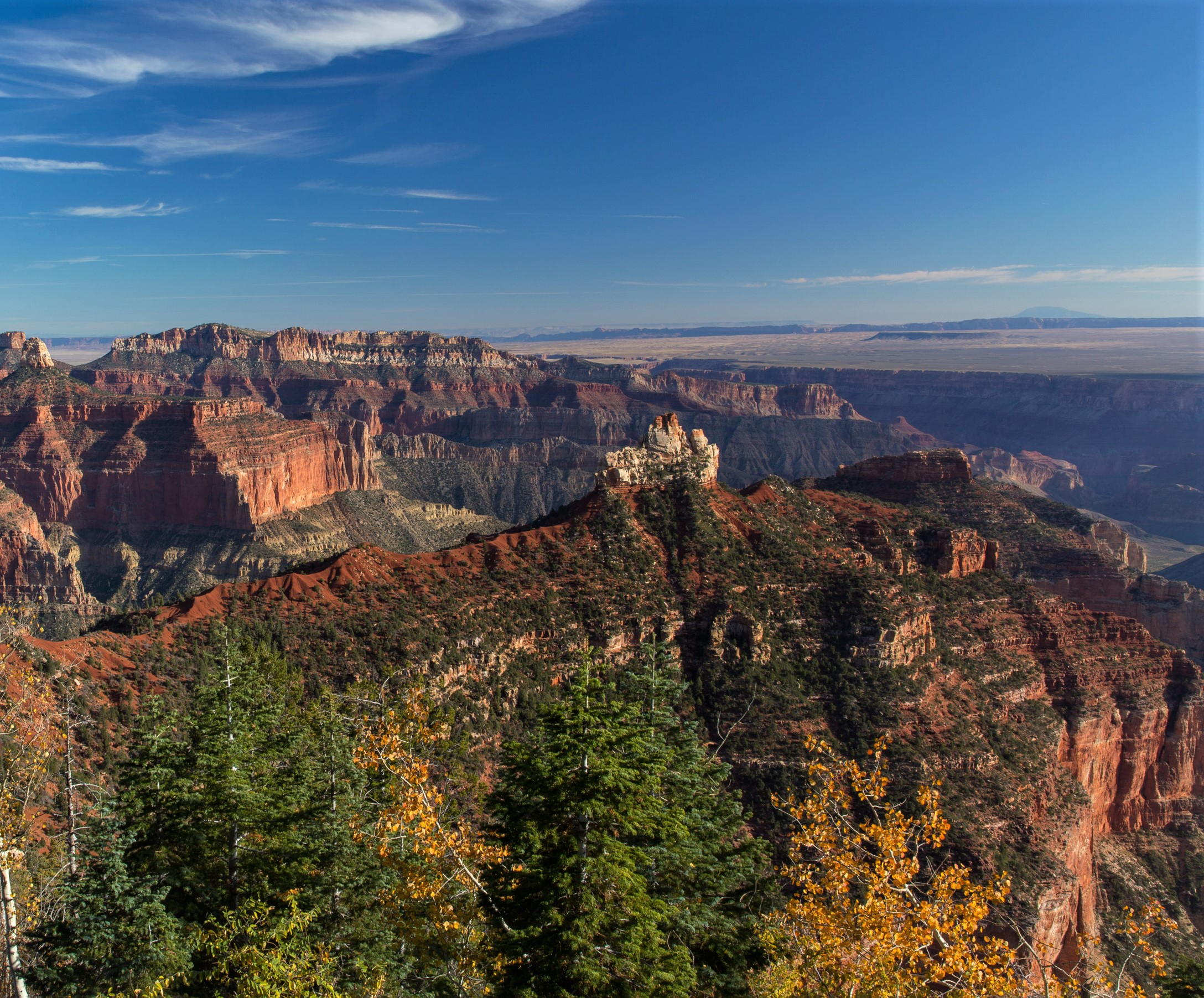
- Southwest aspect, from Vista Encantada

Highest point
- Elevation: 8,121 ft (2,475 m)
- Prominence: 481 ft (147 m)
- Parent peak: Mount Hayden (8,362 ft)
- Isolation: 2.07 mi (3.33 km)
- Coordinates: 36°14′34″N 111°57′49″W

Naming
- Etymology: Peter Rainsford Brady

Geography
- Location within Arizona Location within the United States
- Country: United States
- State: Arizona
- County: Coconino
- Protected area: Grand Canyon National Park
- Parent range: Kaibab Plateau; Colorado Plateau
- Topo map: USGS Walhalla Plateau

Geology
- Rock age: Permian
- Rock type(s): Coconino Sandstone, Hermit Shale

Climbing
- Easiest route: class 5.2 climbing

Brady Peak is an 8,121-foot (2,475 m)-elevation summit located in the Grand Canyon, in Coconino County of northern Arizona, United States. It is situated one mile (1.6 km) northeast of the Vista Encantada viewpoint on the canyon's North Rim, where it towers 4,800 feet (1,500 m) above the bottom of Nankoweap Canyon. Its nearest higher neighbor is Mount Hayden, two miles (3.2 km) to the north, Kibbey Butte is one mile to northwest, and Alsap Butte lies one mile to the northeast. Brady Peak is named after Peter Rainsford Brady (1825–1902), a pioneer and politician of the Arizona Territory. This geographical feature's name was officially adopted in 1932 by the U.S. Board on Geographic Names. According to the Köppen climate classification system, Brady Peak is located in a cold semi-arid climate zone.

== Geology ==
The summit spire of Brady Peak is composed of cream-colored Permian Coconino Sandstone. This sandstone, which is the third-youngest of the strata in the Grand Canyon, was deposited 265 million years ago as sand dunes. Below this Coconino Sandstone is reddish, slope-forming, Permian Hermit Formation, which in turn overlies the Pennsylvanian-Permian Supai Group. Precipitation runoff from this feature drains east into the Colorado River via Nankoweap Creek.

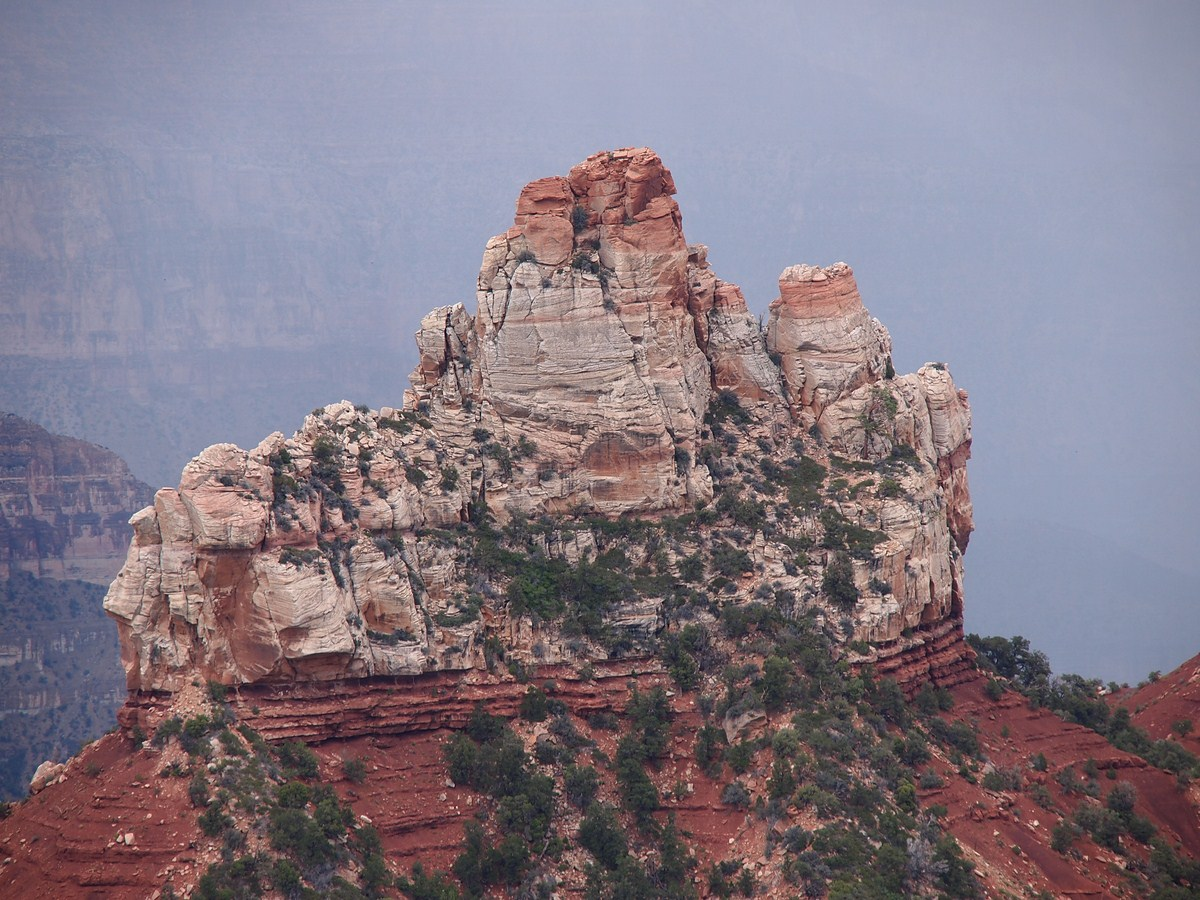

== See also ==
- Geology of the Grand Canyon area
- Siegfried Pyre
- Tritle Peak
- Saddle Mountain

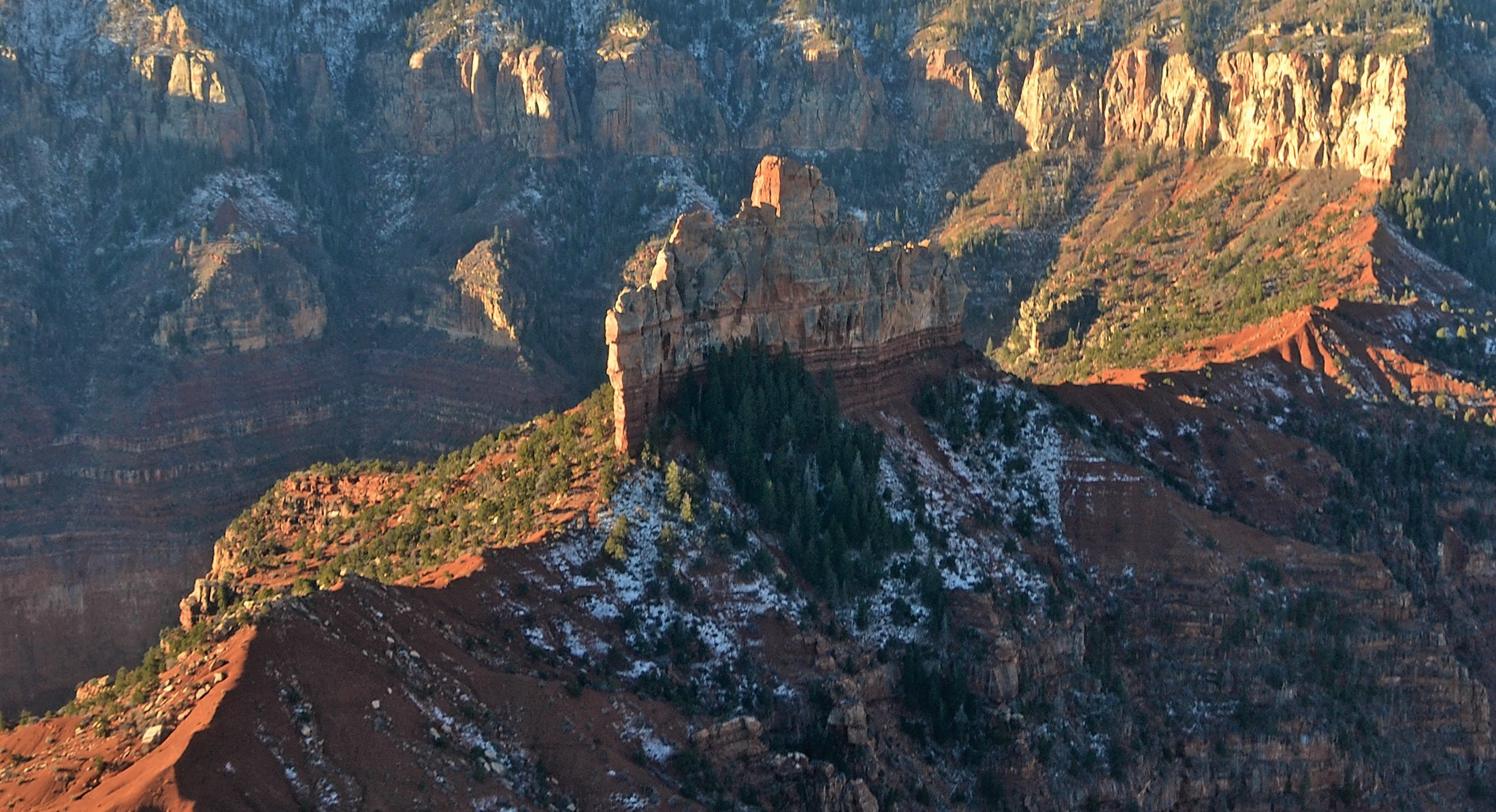
Aerial view from the north-northeast (On horizon: East flank of Walhalla Plateau (Kaibab Plateau))
