= Alsap Butte =

Rock formation in the Grand Canyon, Arizona, United States

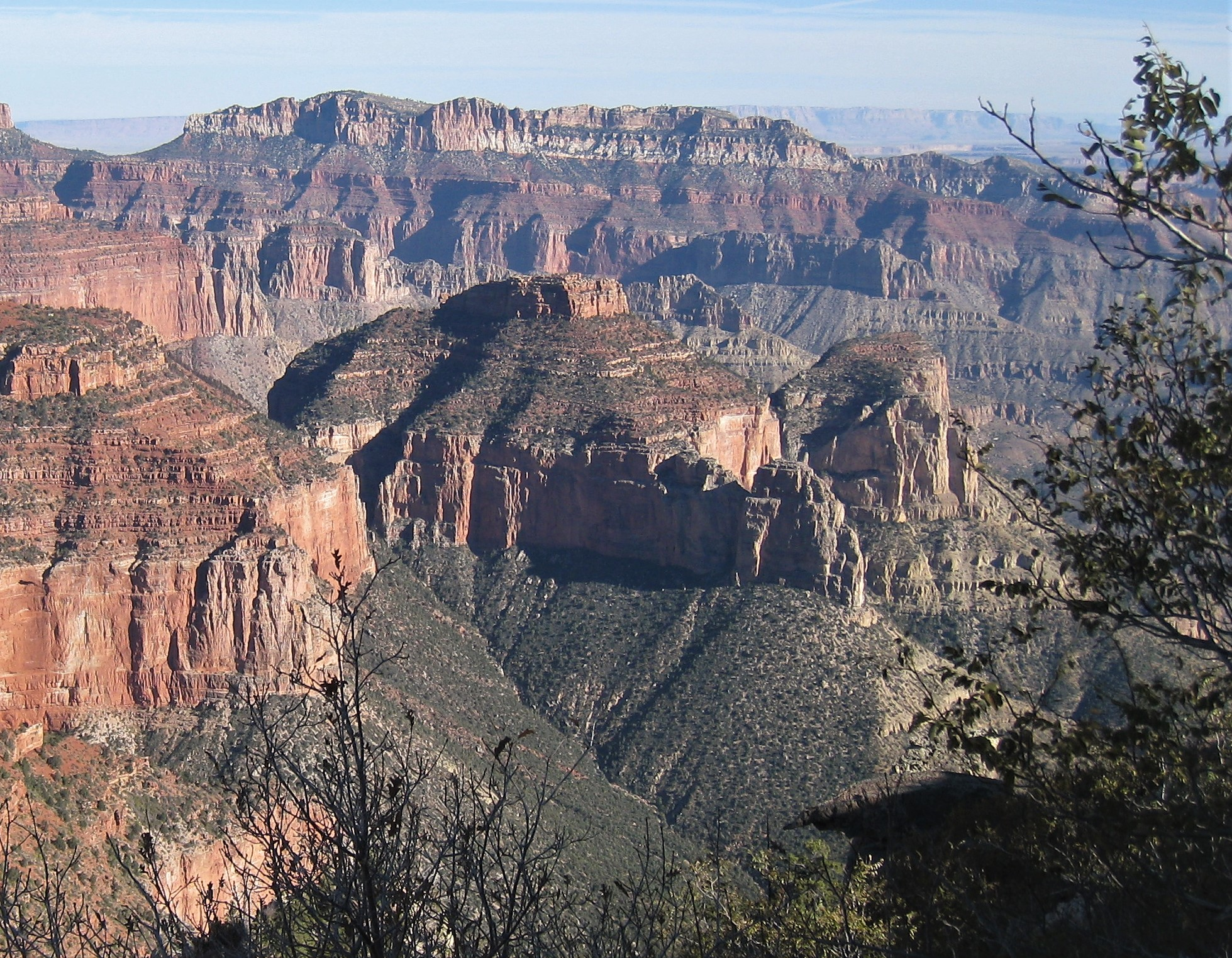
- Alsap Butte centered, south aspect (Saddle Mountain in background)

Highest point
- Elevation: 7,494 ft (2,284 m)
- Prominence: 873 ft (266 m)
- Parent peak: Brady Peak (8,121 ft)
- Isolation: 0.92 mi (1.48 km)
- Coordinates: 36°15′00″N 111°56′59″W

Geography
- Location within Arizona Location within the United States
- Country: United States
- State: Arizona
- County: Coconino
- Protected area: Grand Canyon National Park
- Parent range: Kaibab Plateau; Colorado Plateau
- Topo map: USGS Point Imperial

Geology
- Rock type(s): sandstone, limestone, shale

Climbing
- First ascent: 1972 by Donald Davis

Alsap Butte is a 7,494-foot-elevation (2,284-meter) summit located in the Grand Canyon in Coconino County of northern Arizona, Southwestern United States. It is situated two miles north of the Roosevelt Point on the canyon's North Rim, where it towers 3,700 feet (1,100 meters) above Nankoweap Canyon. Its nearest higher neighbor is Brady Peak, one mile to the southwest, with Hancock Butte and Mount Hayden set to the northwest, and Colter Butte two miles to southeast. Alsap Butte is named after John T. Alsap, a pioneer and politician of the Arizona Territory who served as the first mayor of Phoenix, and is known as "Father of Maricopa County". The geographical feature's name was officially adopted in 1932 by the United States Board on Geographic Names. According to the Köppen climate classification system, Alsap Butte is located in a cold semi-arid climate zone. Alsap Butte is composed of Pennsylvanian-Permian Supai Group overlaying cliff-forming Mississippian Redwall Limestone, which in turn overlays slope-forming Cambrian Tonto Group. Precipitation runoff from this feature drains northeast into the Colorado River via Nankoweap Creek.

== See also ==
- Geology of the Grand Canyon area

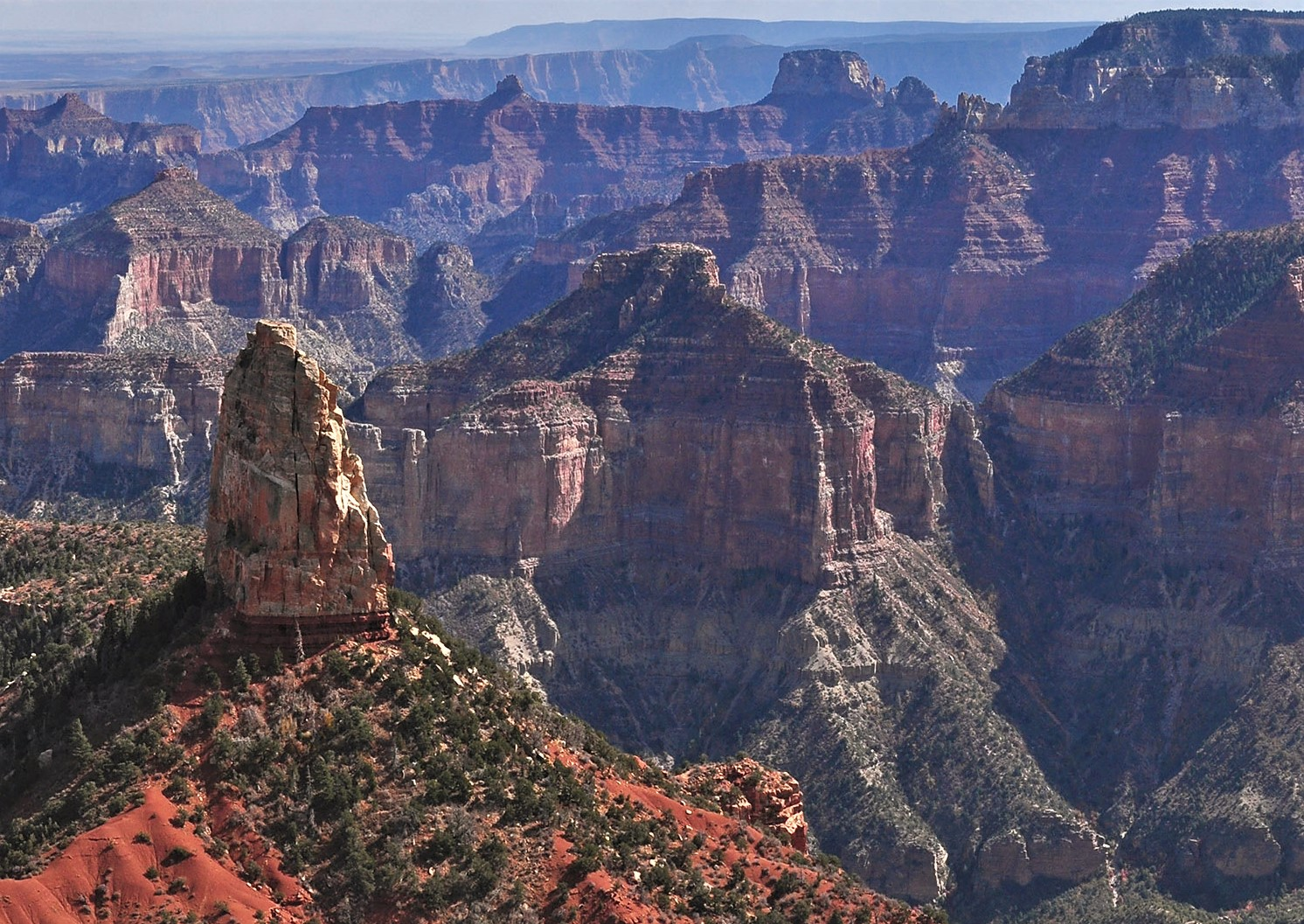
Alsap Butte in bullseye, with Mt. Hayden's summit spire to left. Viewed from northwest at Point Imperial
