= Tritle Peak =

Landform in the Grand Canyon, Arizona

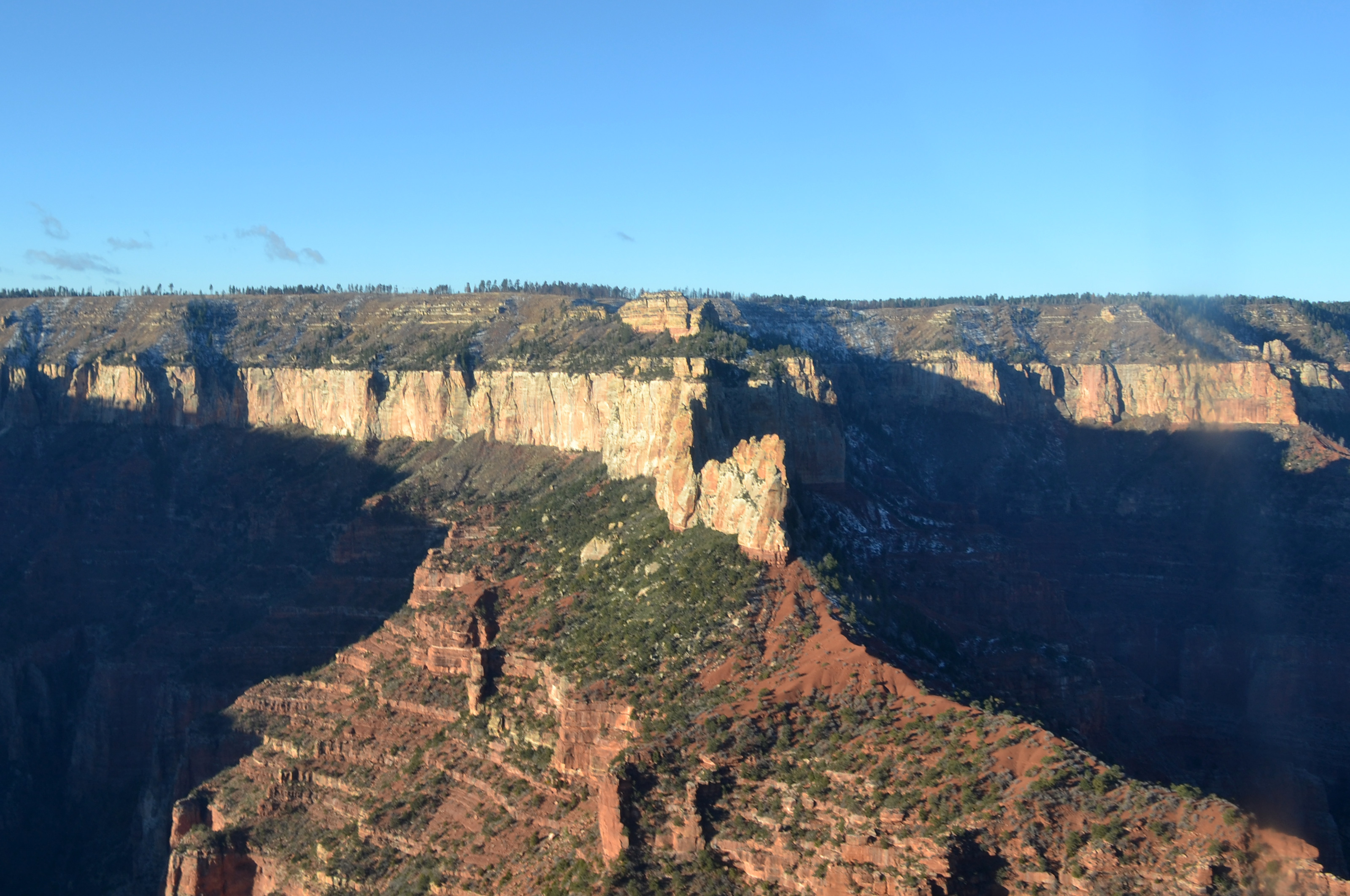
- Tritle Peak (~0.4 mi from Walhalla Plateau, East Rim)

Highest point
- Elevation: 8,388 ft (2,557 m)
- Prominence: 208 ft (63 m)
- Parent peak: Roosevelt Point (and Brady Peak)
- Isolation: 1.5 mi (2.4 km)
- Coordinates: 36.2245°N 111.9478°W

Geography
- Location within Arizona
- Location: Grand Canyon; Coconino County, Arizona. U.S.
- Topo map: USGS Walhalla Plateau

Geology
- Rock age: Permian
- Mountain type(s): sedimentary rock: sandstone, shale, siltstone
- Rock types: Coconino Sandstone-(eroded cliff prominence) and Hermit Shale-(slopes), Esplanade Sandstone-(Supai unit 4), Supai Group, Redwall Limestone

Tritle Peak is an 8,388-foot (2,557 m) prominence adjacent Roosevelt Point, on the East Rim of the Walhalla Plateau (East Kaibab Plateau). It is located in far eastern Grand Canyon, of Northern Arizona. The peak is only about 0.4 miles (0.64 km) northeast of Roosevelt Point on an eroded ridgeline, and it is a very short caprock remainder of Coconino Sandstone cliffs upon Hermit Shale slopes. The entire ridge is a bright dark-burnt-red from the Hermit Shale, and sits on a ridgeline-platform of Supai Group unit 4, the Esplanade Sandstone.

Tritle Peak is at the headwaters of two major drainages east to the south-flowing Colorado River, next to the East Rim, Grand Canyon – Upper Nankoweap Creek drainage (north), and Upper Kwagunt Creek drainage (south).

== Geology (ridgeline of Esplanade Sandstone) ==
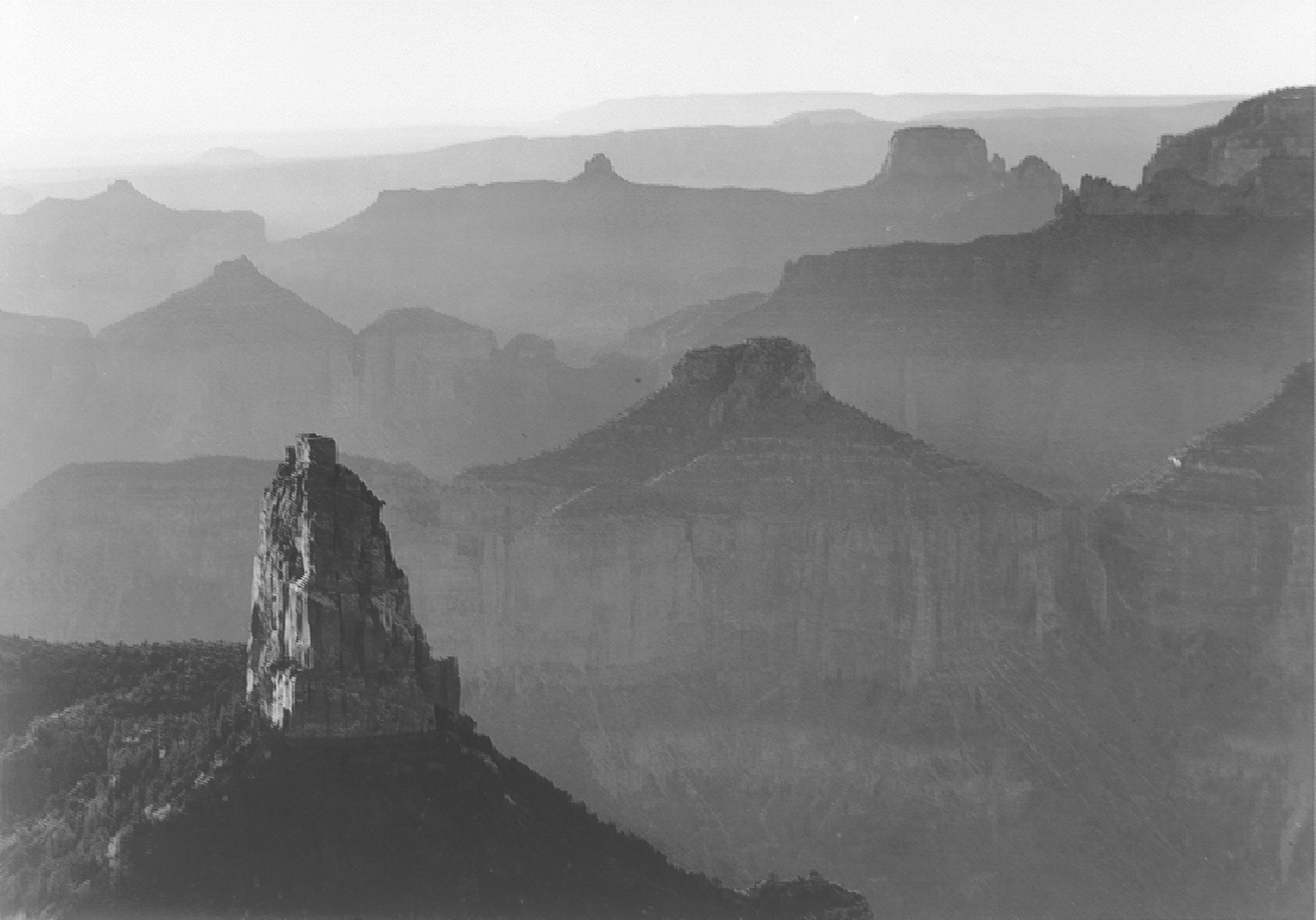
(at horizon) – Platform-ridgeline of Esplanade Sandstone (Supai Group unit 4 of 4), a cliff & platform rock unit. (at horizon in profile) – On ridgeline, Siegfried Pyre, and closer, at right at cliff, the small Tritle Peak. (Mount Hayden foreground)

In the region adjacent to the East Rim of the Walhalla Plateau (Kaibab Plateau), at rock units of the upper Supai Group, the platforms of the Esplanade Sandstone support various landforms. They are namely - Mount Hayden, Brady Peak, and Tritle Peak. The peaks are composed of eroded Coconino Sandstone, upon Hermit Shale, (slope-formed) slopes, debris-filled or vegetated. Ridgelines with no remaining Coconino Sandstone peaks, will be dk-reddish, or red from the Supai Group (with 2 cliff-layers & 2 slope-layers). Numerous ridgelines along the Walhalla Plateau East Rim have shed this Coconino Sandstone.

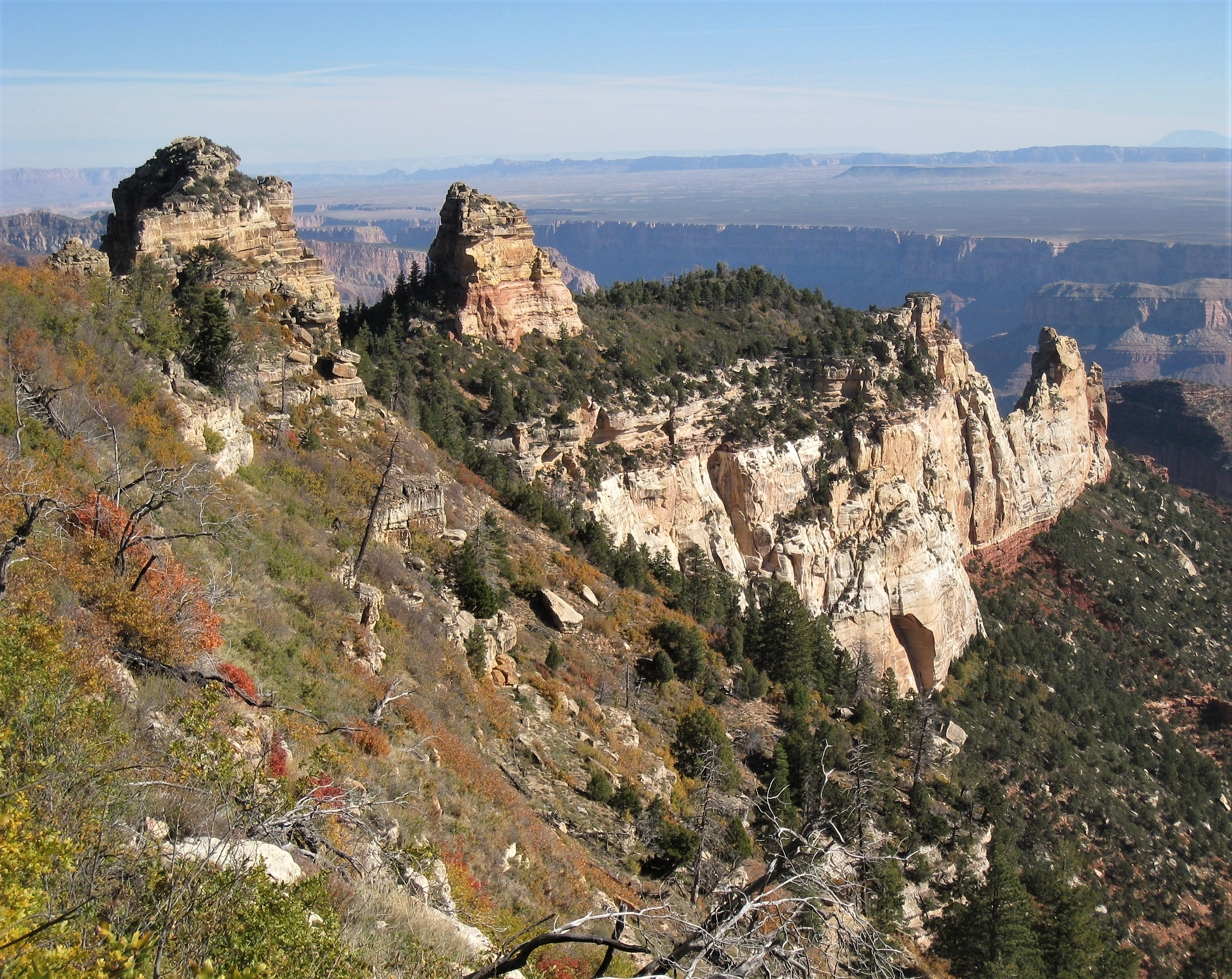
Tritle Peak seen from Roosevelt Point This peak is named after Frederick Augustus Tritle
