= Charles T. Hayden =

American businessman and probate judge (1825–1900)

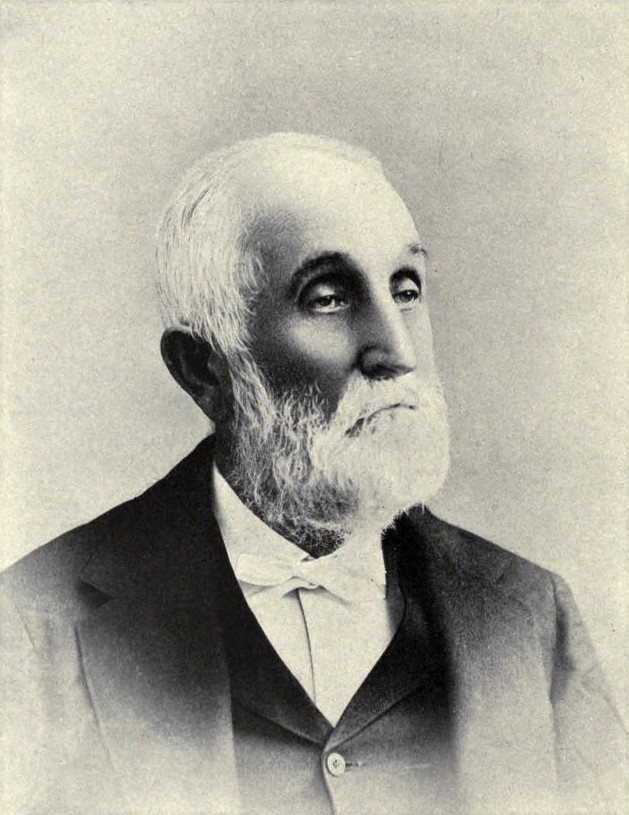
- Born: Charles Trumbull Hayden; April 4, 1825; Hartford, Connecticut, U.S.
- Died: February 5, 1900; Tempe, Arizona Territory, U.S.
- Other name: Don Carlos
- Occupations: businessman, probate judge
- Spouse: Sallie Calvert Davis
- Children: Carl Hayden, Sallie Davis, Anna Spenser, Mary "Mapes" Calvert
- Parent(s): Joseph Hayden; Mary Hanks Hayden

Charles Trumbull Hayden (April 4, 1825 – February 5, 1900) was an American businessman and probate judge. His influence was felt in the development of Arizona Territory where he helped found both the city of Tempe and Arizona State University. Hayden was the father of U.S. Senator Carl Hayden.

== Early life ==
Hayden was born on April 4, 1825, in the village of Haydens in Windsor, Hartford County, Connecticut, the son of Joseph and Mary Hanks Hayden. He was a descendant of English settlers who arrived in 1630 and settled in the Connecticut River valley. Hayden's father died when he was six, leaving himself and his sister Anna to help his mother run the family farm. He completed his education at 16 and worked as a clerk for several years before leaving home in 1843. His departure was motivated in part by a lung ailment.

From Connecticut, Hayden went to New York City, where he studied law, before beginning a series of teaching jobs in Kentucky, Indiana, and Missouri. While in Kentucky, Hayden was influenced by Henry Clay's vision of opening the West to settlement by the development of roads and canals. By 1847, he was working as a teamster hauling freight on the Santa Fe Trail.

== Relocation to Arizona ==
Following ratification of the Gadsden Purchase, Hayden established a store in Tubac which served the nearby mines. By 1860, he had moved to Tucson and according to census records had assets worth US$20,000. In addition to working as a merchant, Hayden also worked as a freighter and civic leader. With the creation of Arizona Territory, he added mail contractor to his list of duties. Finally, he was appointed a probate judge by Governor Goodwin and he achieved the title "judge".

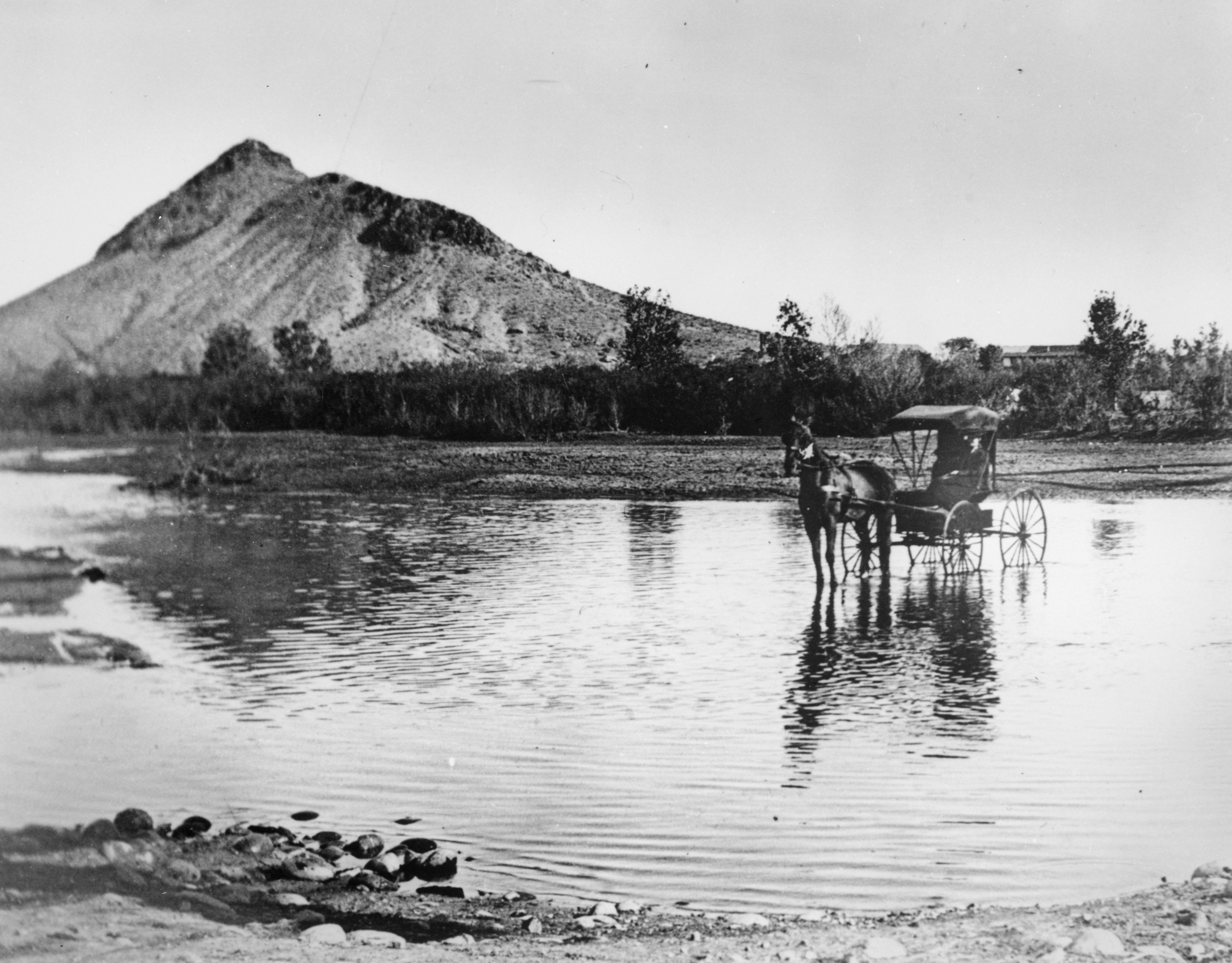
Hayden's Ferry between 1870 and 1880

Hayden remained in Tucson until 1873 when he moved to the Salt River valley. Local legend claims that while he was on a business trip from Tucson to Prescott, flood waters on the Salt River delayed him near the present location of Tempe, Arizona, for several days. Using this time to explore the site, Hayden saw the potential to develop a new town at the site. In December 1870, Hayden published a notice claiming two sections along the south side of the Salt River "for milling, farming, and other purposes". He used the land to build a cable ferry, grist mill, general store, and other related businesses.

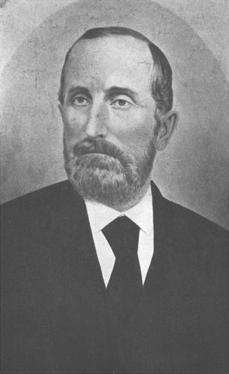
Judge Charles T. Hayden

Politically, Hayden made an unsuccessful run to be Arizona Territory's congressional delegate in 1874. This was followed in 1884 when Grover Cleveland considered him for Governor of Arizona Territory. In 1885, Hayden succeeded in having a former employee, John S. Armstrong, elected to the 13th Arizona Territorial Legislature. Believing the territory's need lie primarily in educating new teachers, Hayden used his connection with Armstrong to lobby for the Territorial Normal School. Hayden even favored the normal school over the fiscally more lucrative insane asylum, arguing "Stockton, California, was known to most people only as the place where insane people are confined" and that Tempe should not risk gaining a similar reputation. The normal school established in Tempe is now Arizona State University.

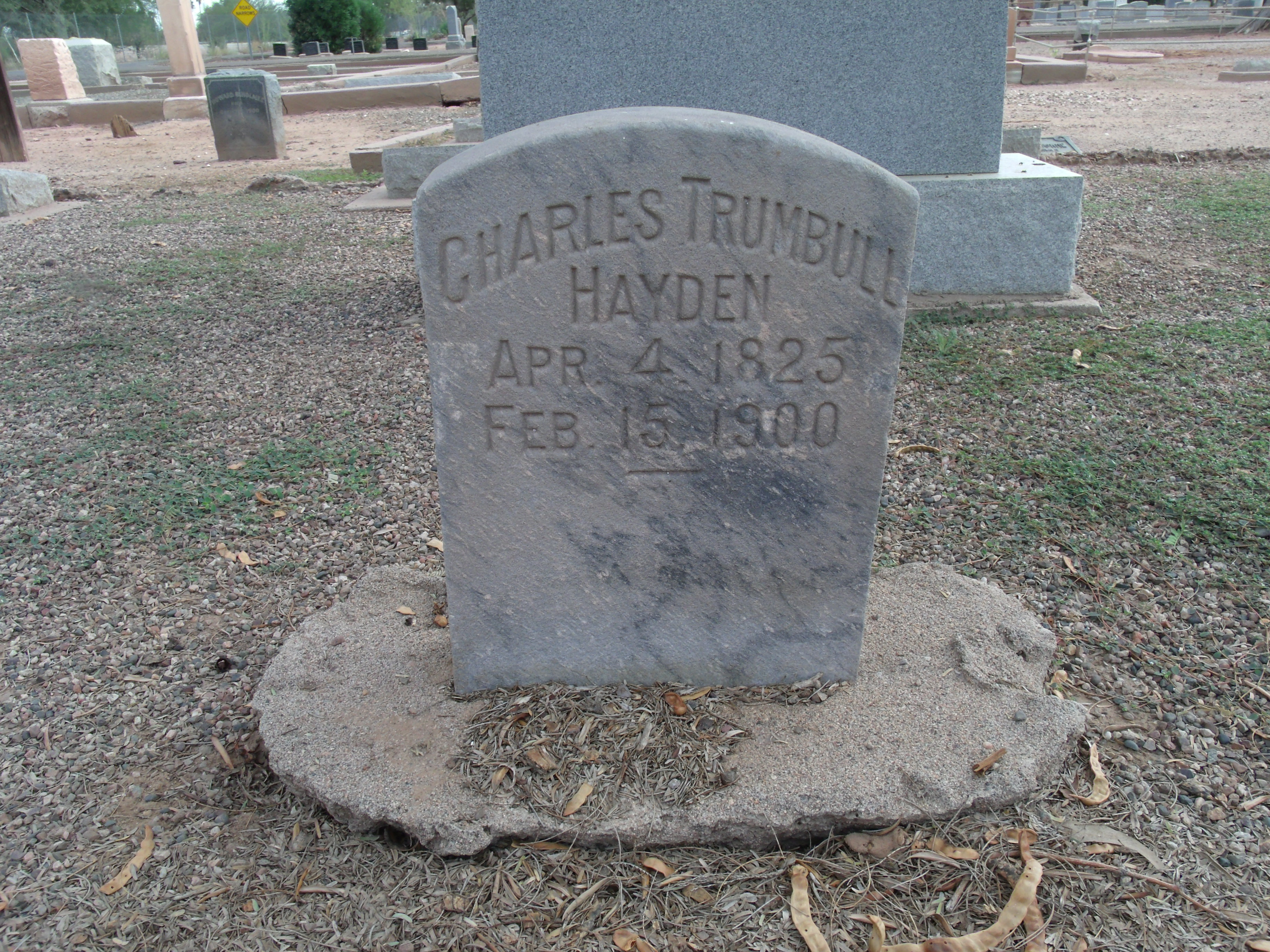
The grave site of Charles Trumbull Hayden ; Sec. B – 49 in Double Butte Cemetery.

Hayden remained in Tempe for the rest of his life and died on February 5, 1900. He is buried in Tempe's Double Butte Cemetery. Mount Hayden in the Grand Canyon is named after him.

== Family ==
On October 4, 1876, at the age of 51, Hayden married Arkansas-born schoolteacher Sallie Calvert Davis in Nevada City, California. The couple would have four children, Carl Trumbull, Sallie Davis, Anna Spenser, and Mary "Mapes" Calvert. Anna died when two-and-a-half years old while the three other children reached maturity.

== Hayden's house and mill ==
Hayden's House and Mill
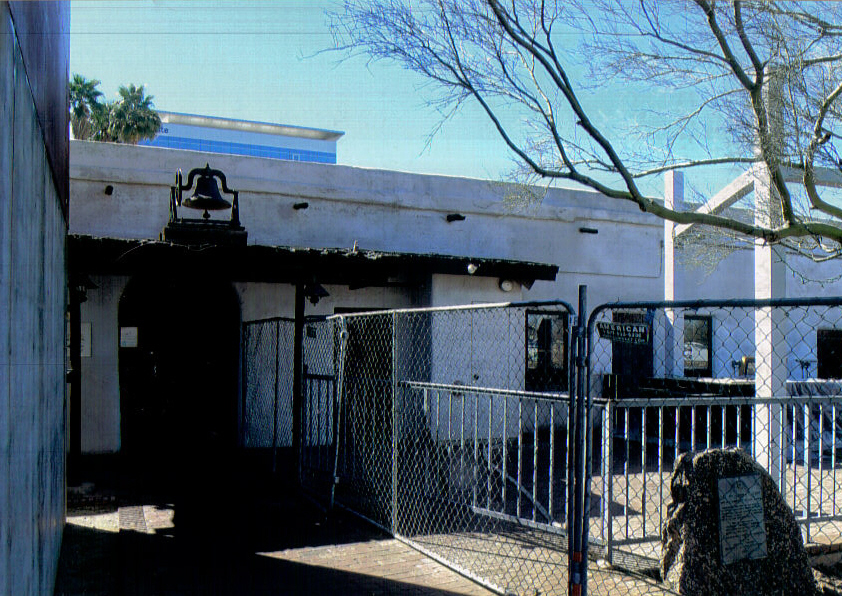
The Charles T. Hayden House was built in 1871 and is located at 1 W. Rio Salado Parkway. It is the oldest building in Tempe. It was the residence of Charles Trumbull Hayden and his family. The Hayden family moved out of the house in 1889. It has since been renovated as a restaurant. It was listed in the National Register of Historic Places on October 10, 1984 reference #84000173.

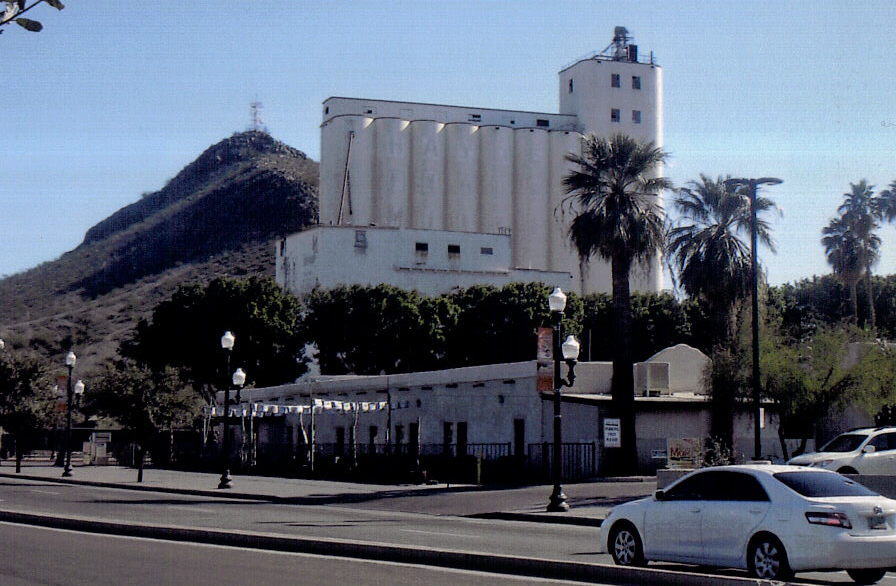
The Hayden Flour Mill, was originally built by Charles T. Hayden in 1874, thus the name of "Mill Avenue" in Tempe.

== Notes ==
- August, Jack L. (1999). Vision in the Desert: Carl Hayden and Hydropolitics in the American Southwest. Fort Worth: Texas Christian University Press. ISBN 0-87565-310-3.
- Rice, Ross R. (1994). Carl Hayden: Builder of the American West. Lanham, MD: University Press of America. ISBN 0-8191-9399-2.
- Wagoner, Jay J. (1970). Arizona Territory 1863-1912: A Political history. Tucson: University of Arizona Press. ISBN 0-8165-0176-9.
