= Greenland Lake =

Waterbody in the Grand Canyon, Arizona

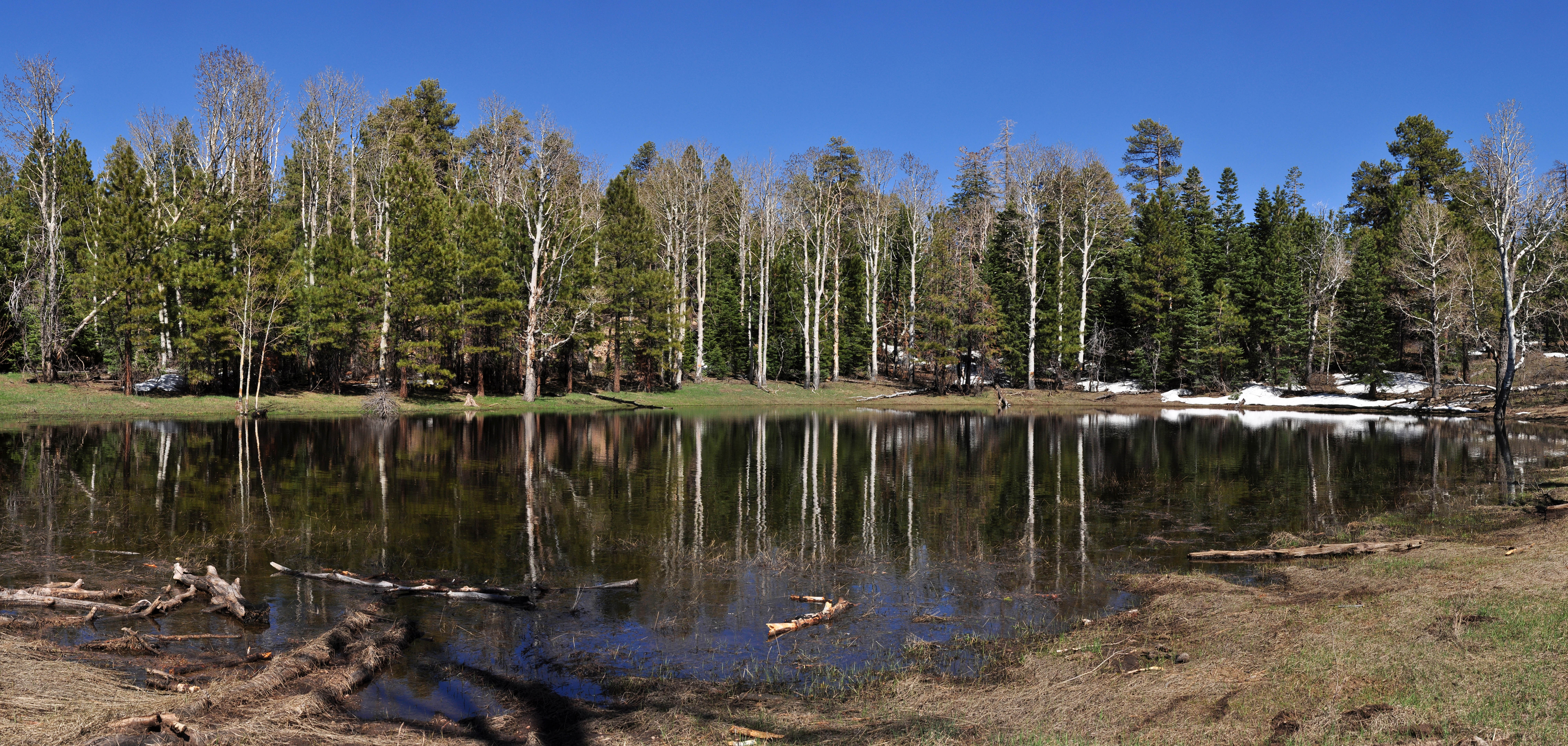

- Location within Arizona Location within the United States
- Location: Coconino County, Arizona, United States
- Coordinates: 36°14′32″N 111°59′29″W
- Basin countries: United States
- Surface area: 5 acres (2.0 ha)l
- Average depth: 10 ft (3.0 m)
- Surface elevation: 8,400 ft (2,600 m)

Greenland Lake is a small, intermittent lake of northern Arizona, located at the north neck of the Walhalla Plateau (east Kaibab Plateau), in the northeast Grand Canyon. The lake is located just west (~1/8 mile), of the south-running Cape Royal Road (about 1.5 miles north of Vista Encantada), which eventually turns south-southwesterly to Cape Royal, about 15 miles distant. Greenland Lake is also about 1 mile east of Greenland Spring, at the far north of Bright Angel Canyon.

Greenland Lake is often intermittent, depending on winter snowfall; the lake is surrounded mostly by aspen, but also Ponderosa Pine, and Douglas Fir. It is a common water source for wildlife, especially deer. In historic times, cattle were grazed in the area, and a wood cabin (high-pitched roof for snow), was used for storage of salt, for cattle.

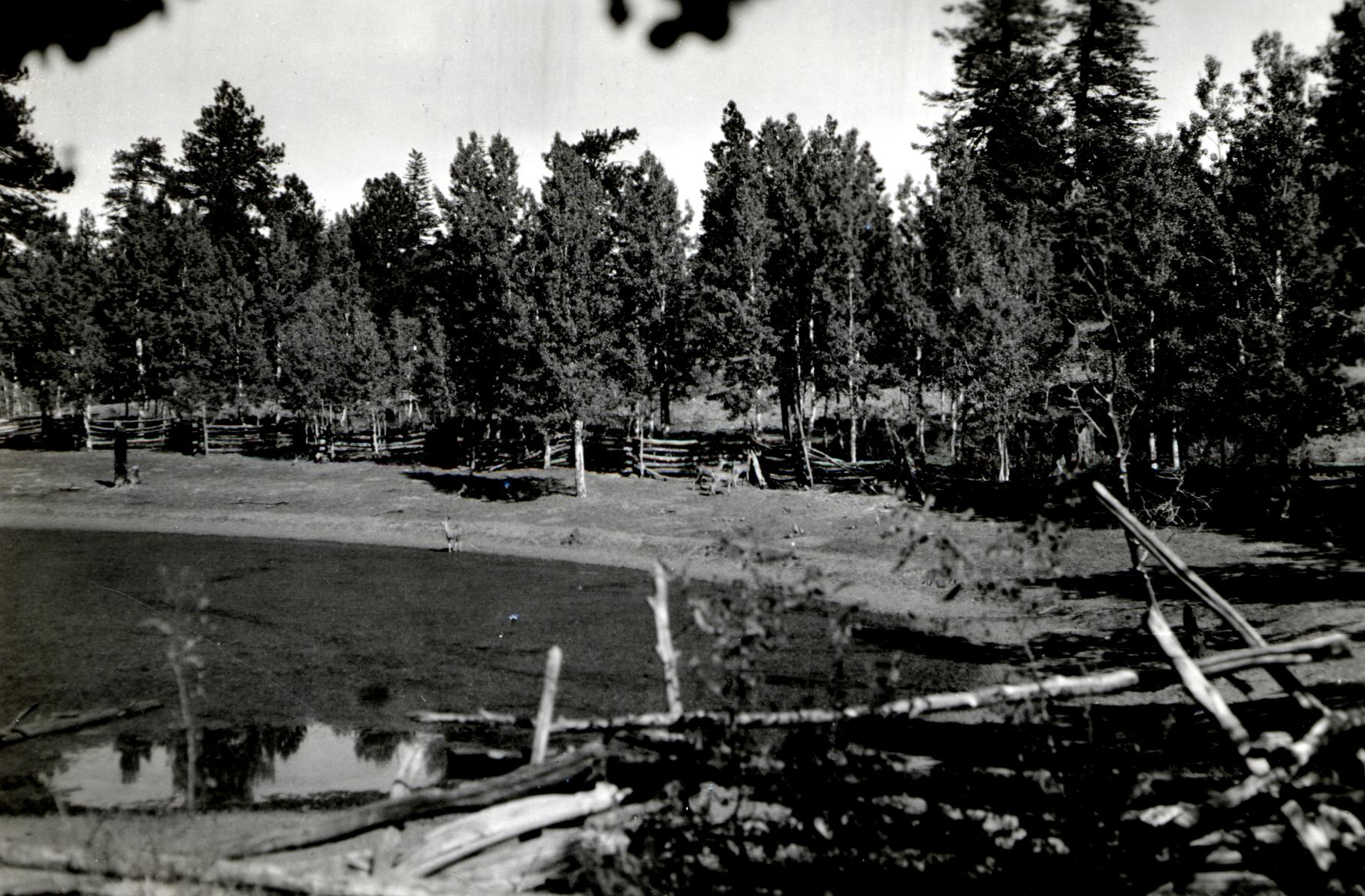
