= Peter Rainsford Brady =

American military officer, surveyor and politician (1825–1902)

- Born: August 4, 1825; Georgetown (Washington, D.C.), US
- Died: May 2, 1902 (aged 76); Tucson, Arizona, US
- Military career
- Allegiance: United States of America
- Branch: United States Navy
- Service years: 1843 or 1844 through 1846
- Obsolete rank: Passed Midshipman (probable)

Peter Rainsford Brady (August 4, 1825 – May 2, 1902) was an American military officer, surveyor and politician. Following a short service in the United States Navy he joined the Texas Rangers, where he served during the Mexican–American War and along the western frontier. From Texas he moved westward where he became an early settler and political office holder in Arizona Territory.

== Background ==
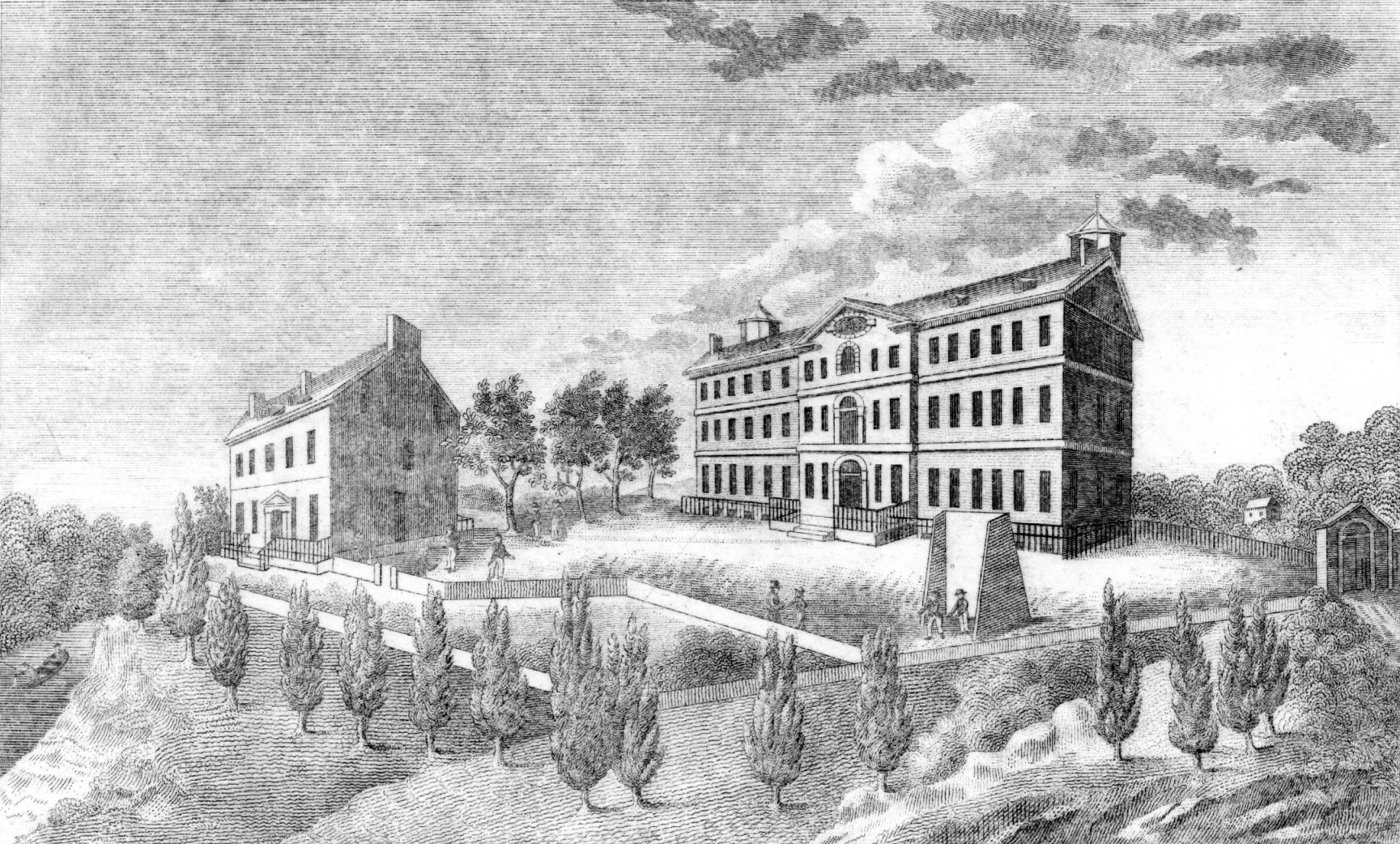
Georgetown College, 1829

Brady was born to Peter and Ann (Rainsford) Brady on August 4, 1825, in the Georgetown section of Washington, D.C. His mother was a Londoner. She married a citizen of Georgetown at age 21. Besides Peter they had two daughters, Margaret Ann and Mary Ellen.

Peter was educated at Georgetown College, starting at age 12. This event is not to be judged by today's educational system, which did not then exist. There was no distinction between secondary and college education. The "college" at that time was more of a boy's private school. It included both primary and secondary education.

== Naval foray ==
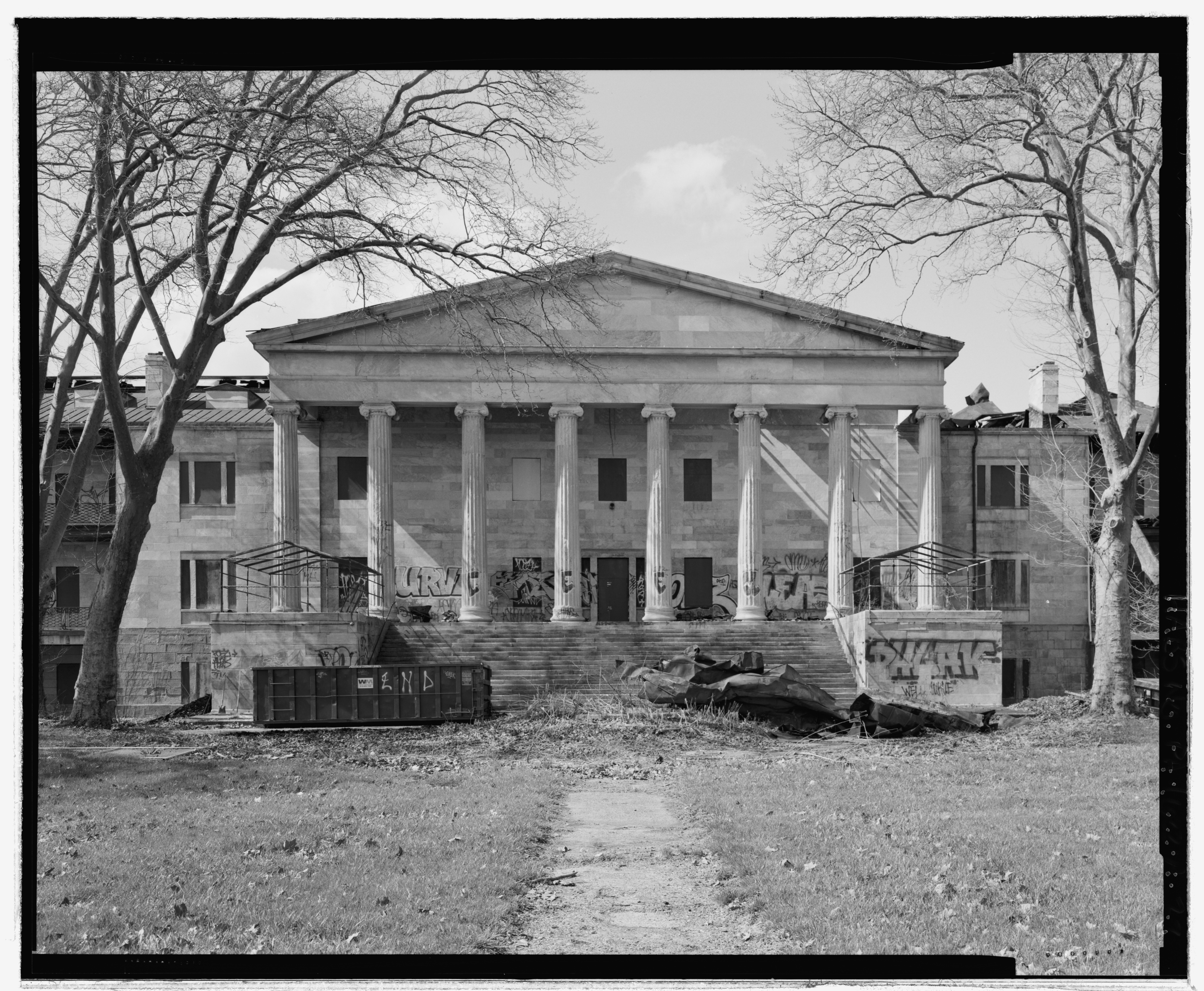
Biddle Hall, Philadelphia Naval Asylum building, 1963. Note the resemblance to Bancroft Hall, USNA.

Modern attempts to deal with his naval service are similarly confounded; notably, Texas Ranger handbooks and sites claim various things, that he graduated from the United States Naval Academy at Annapolis, Maryland, in 1844, and after a year's service resigned from the navy, or that he served as a midshipman, but not at the Academy. The Academy was founded in 1845. The most credible report has him being a midshipman 1844–1846, graduating with the first class ever to graduate from there, Class of 1846, and resigning to fight in the Mexican–American War with the "Texas Rangers," then the military arm of the new State of Texas.

One may speculate as follows. Originally student naval officers, or midshipmen, began their careers in a more practical vein aboard a sailing ship of war. After an apprenticeship at sea they took an examination, passing which they were termed "passed midshipman," a term that persisted in the early Naval Academy. The rank of Lieutenant then had to be earned. The rank of Ensign as it exists today was not created until the Civil War, when it was resurrected from an earlier use. "Passed midshipman" was dropped in its favor.

In 1834 a Naval School was created, but it had to be placed in the Philadelphia Naval Asylum at Naval Square, Philadelphia, which it shared with a hospital and a naval retirement home. This fine building bore a resemblance to the first Bancroft Hall. The inappropriate name of Naval Asylum clung to the educational institution rather than its official name of Naval School. A requirement was now added that all midshipmen must serve 8 months at the Naval School and take their examination there. Before then the Midshipmen were "active," meaning they were in a ship-board environment. If they passed they were "Passed." In 1845 the new Academy at Annapolis collected both midshipmen and instructors from the Philadelphia school. Time spent at the Naval School and on voyages counted; thus the Academy was able to have graduates one year after its founding.

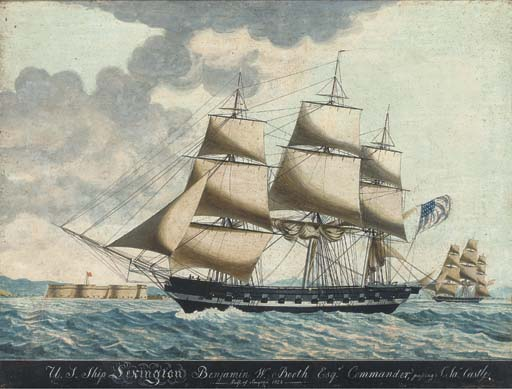
USS Lexington (1825) off Smyrna by Corsini

Brady is reported by some (credibly or not) to have served as midshipman on the early USS Lexington and also aboard the USS Plymouth in the Mediterranean Sea. The Lexington might be thought less likely, as she was in the Mediterranean the whole time Brady must have been at the Naval School/Academy. There is some evidence for the Plymouth. The Army and Navy Chronicle of April 18, 1844, reports the departure of the USS Plymouth to join the Mediterranean Squadron, then patrolling the Mediterranean to serve United States interests and prevent the re-institution of piracy along the Barbary Coast. Among the acting midshipmen was Peter P. Brady, where the P must be a typographical error for R.

When the Academy began in 1845 it did so with a roster of Midshipmen from the Naval School and any active Midshipmen ready for their required attendance at the School. It was a five-year program: first and last at Annapolis, middle three at sea. In January, 1846, it had 36 who had started, apparently at the Naval School, in 1840, 13 in 1841, and 7 appointees from 1845. The 36 would be the Class of 1846. Brady was not among any of them, barring an omission by error.

Conspicuously absent were midshipmen from 1843 and 1844, the reason probably being that they were away at sea. Other officers of flag rank in the later Navy, known graduates, claimed to have been at sea in those years. Registries of Academy midshipmen were not kept, or at least did not survive, until after the reorganization of 1850, so there would seem to be no way to verify the attendance and graduation of people such as Brady, who left the Navy immediately after graduation. The early population had to be reconstructed imperfectly from other sources.

It is not absolutely certain that Brady attended, or chose to resign rather than attend. If he did attend, it is not certain that he graduated. It is documented that he was on the Plymouth. She was with the Mediterranean Squadron until October, 1846, too late for Brady to have been in the Class of 1846, if he was with her the whole time, which is questionable. Although it was true that whalers were gone for years at a time, it was not true for ships on station. Transfers to or from the ships happened frequently. They must also have been in port frequently, That being so, midshipmen such as Brady were probably given a time aboard every ship in the squadron. He could have been reassigned in time for the Class of 1846, or even 1847. If most of the sources say that he graduated, they probably got the information from Brady himself, who was alive well into the age of photography.

== Surveyor of the Fisher-Miller land grant ==
In 1846, Peter Brady, an urbane citizen of the nation's capital, well-educated and well-travelled in the Mediterranean region, left the United States Navy and the capital to travel to the desert country of West Texas, full of hostile Native Americans, never to return to the east, and never, in essence, to travel anywhere else except Texas, Arizona, and New Mexico. He had no personal reason to go there, no friends or relatives, and no knowledge of the people or the terrain.

The answer to this conundrum is perhaps to be found in the subsequent events of his life. He was a businessman, getting caught up in the gold rush and trying his hand at various enterprises, such as ranching. The immediate cause was some high-paying work as a surveyor, which was similar to practical navigation. He would have to take bearings and lay out triangles on a chart, which he had been trained to do. Texas had been admitted by Congress to the Union as a slave state in 1845 without any interim as territory. One result was war with Mexico, which considered that they still owned it. The Texans, needing a quick build-up of population, were offering free land in a large slice of West Texas.

In offering this land for free, the new Texan-Americans were not being entirely candid. Whatever reasons they had, settlement of the Fisher–Miller Land Grant, as it came to be called, was neither quick nor easy, the reason being that it was situated in the middle of Comancheria, the name given to lands of the Comanche Native Americans, a major plains people. It was the hunting grounds of a division called the Penateka Comanches, then understandably hostile to intrusion.

There were but few surviving takers of the offer. In despair, the new state sold the land to Adelsverein, a quasi-altruistic private company whose product was the facilitation of settlement of North Europeans in Texas. The company was not told that the land was in Comancheria. The Federal Government, in the middle of a war with Mexico, anticipating that Texas had incurred a problem it could not solve, began to manage the problem.

The surveying company of J.J. Giddings was brought in. John James Giddings (1821–1861), founder and owner, was one of a family of brothers from Pennsylvania who specialized in civil engineering in rough-and-ready circumstances on the frontier. One of them, Dewitt Clinton Giddings, later became a United States Representative from Texas. J.J. Giddings would conduct a survey of Comancheria, dividing it into farmable lots. The surveyors would be protected by the Texas Rangers. They would be highly paid for hazardous work. The survey was to begin in January, 1847, and be finished as quickly as possible.

Brady would have graduated in June, 1846, if that theory of his Naval Academy years is accepted. Less than six months later he had resigned and had reported for work in San Antonio as a surveyor. His first assignment for the Navy is obscure, but it had not lasted long. Fresh from the east, he must have seemed pretty much of an eastern "dude." He had no training in working from a horse, roughing it in the wilderness, or fighting with a Colt .44 or Bowie knife, but he seems to have been popular with his companions. Once he misidentified a river. The team jestingly called it "Brady Creek."

== Texas Ranger, first enlistment ==
After leaving the navy, Brady went to San Antonio, Texas, where he joined the Texas Rangers. During the Mexican–American War he served in the Rangers with distinction as a lieutenant. At the end of the war he lived for a short time in Jalisco, Mexico before returning to Texas.

In 1847, Brady served as a member of a surveying company working the Fisher–Miller Land Grant. During November of the same year, Lt. Col. Peter Hansbrough Bell recruited him to serve in a Ranger company protecting Texas' western frontier. He remained with the Rangers until September 30, 1848, when he joined the California Gold Rush. Brady returned to the Texas Rangers in 1850, serving as a company's first lieutenant.

== Frontier entrepreneur ==
Brady left the Texas Rangers in 1853 to become captain of Andrew Gray's survey team searching for a railroad route between Indianola, Texas, and San Diego, California. When the team disbanded the next year in San Francisco, he formed the Arizona Mining & Trading Company and returned to the Gadsden Purchase, settling Tucson. In addition to his work as a miner, Brady became an interpreter for the Boundary Commission in 1855. The following year he signed a petition seeking territorial status for Arizona. In 1859, Brady married Juanita Mendibles. The marriage produced four sons before her death in 1871.

== Agent for the Union ==
With the outbreak of the American Civil War, Brady found himself one of the few Union supporters in the area. He spent much of the war in Sonora gathering supplies and intelligence for Union forces, including providing vital intelligence for the Battle of Picacho Peak. At the end of the war he returned to Tucson where he served as an Indian interpreter and two terms as sheriff. Governor Anson P.K. Safford also appointed him a military adviser at the rank of major. In 1871, Brady represented Pima County, Arizona, as a Council member during the 8th Arizona Territorial Legislature. Later the same year he ran for Territorial Delegate to the United States House of Representatives but was narrowly defeated by Richard Cunningham McCormick.

== Rancher and territorial official ==
Following the creation of Pinal County in 1875, Brady moved from Tucson to Florence. There he engaged in farming, ranching, and mining. Brady remarried in 1878. The second marriage, to María Antonia Ochóa, produced three sons and a daughter. Brady served briefly as chairman of the board of prison commissioners in 1889. The same year, he was appointed a special agent by the United States Department of the Interior to help with investigation of James Reavis' land grant claim. He later returned for two additional terms in the territorial council, being elected to both the 16th (1891) and 19th (1897) sessions.

Brady moved back to Tucson in 1899. He remained there till his death on May 2, 1902. Brady Avenue in Tucson is named in his honor, as is Brady Peak in Grand Canyon National Park.
