= Mount Hayden (Arizona) =

Landform in the Grand Canyon, Arizona

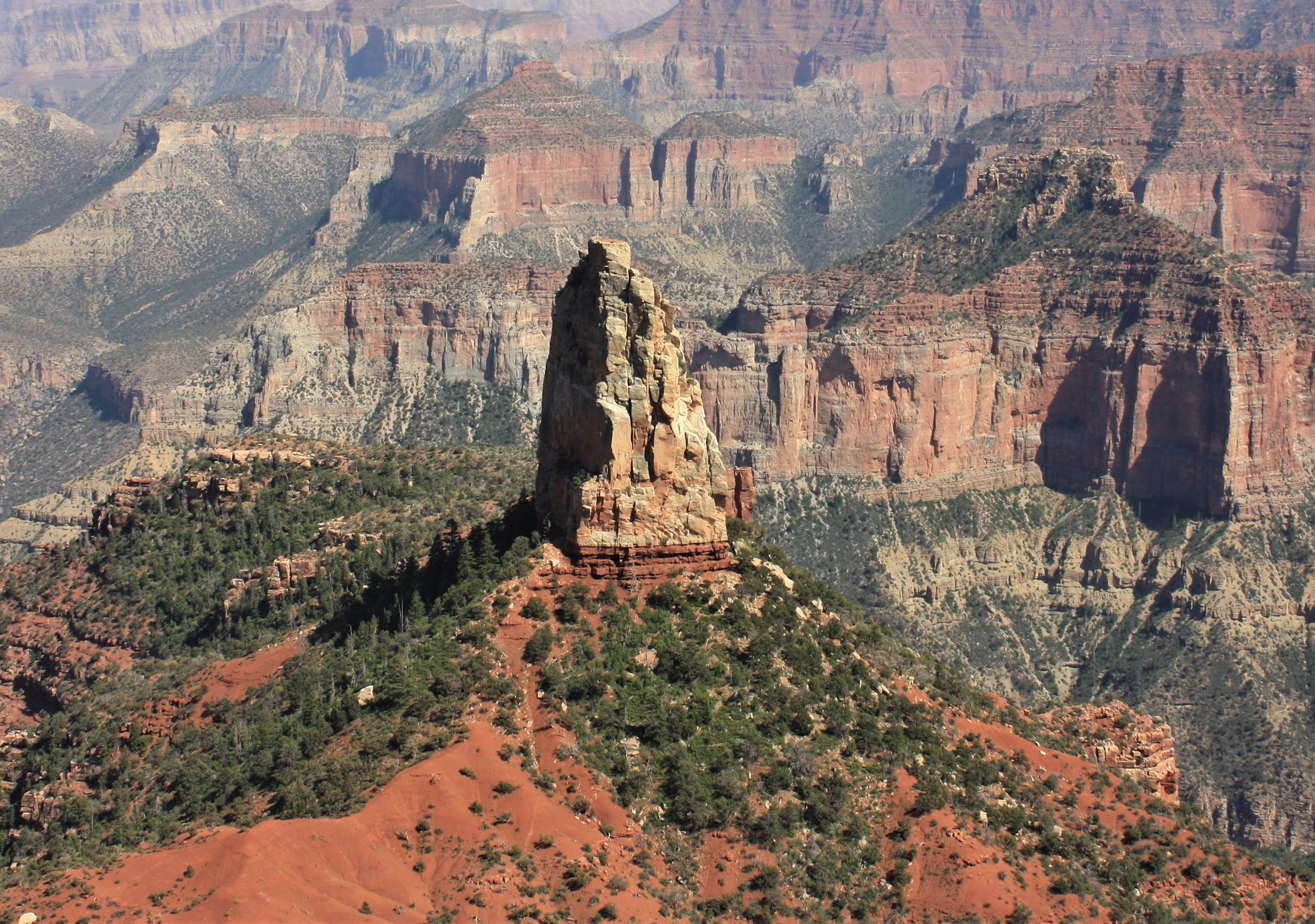
- Northwest aspect seen from Point Imperial

Highest point
- Elevation: 8,362 ft (2,549 m)
- Prominence: 522 ft (159 m)
- Isolation: 2.44 mi (3.93 km)
- Coordinates: 36°16′21″N 111°58′09″W

Naming
- Etymology: Charles T. Hayden

Geography
- Location within Arizona Location within the United States
- Location: Grand Canyon; Coconino County, Arizona, US
- Parent range: Kaibab Plateau; Colorado Plateau
- Topo map: USGS Point Imperial

Geology
- Rock type(s): Coconino Sandstone, Hermit Shale

Climbing
- First ascent: 1977 or 1978
- Easiest route: South Face class 5.7+ climbing

Mount Hayden is an 8,362-foot (2,549 m)-elevation summit located in the Grand Canyon, in Coconino County of Arizona, United States. It is situated one-half mile (0.80 km) southeast of the Point Imperial viewpoint (eastern Walhalla Plateau), on the canyon's North Rim, where it towers 5,000 feet (1,500 m) above the bottom of Nankoweap Canyon. Mount Hayden, also known as Hayden Peak, is named for Charles T. Hayden (1825–1900), an Arizona pioneer influential in the development of the Arizona Territory where he was known as the "Father of Tempe", and he established Arizona State University. He was also the father of US Senator Carl Hayden, as well as a probate judge. This geographical feature's name was officially adopted in 1932 by the U.S. Board on Geographic Names.

The first ascent of the summit was made in May 1978 by Joe Sharber, George Bain, and Abra Watkins via the north side (class 5.9 A2). Pegasus, a challenging class 5.10+ route on the East Face, was first climbed by Paul Davidson and Jim Haisley in 1982. The most popular climbing route is the class 5.8 South Face. According to the Köppen climate classification system, Mount Hayden is located in a Cold semi-arid climate zone.

== Geology ==
The summit spire of Mount Hayden is composed of cream-colored, cliff-forming, Permian Coconino Sandstone caprock. This sandstone, which is the third-youngest of the strata in the Grand Canyon, was deposited 265 million years ago as sand dunes. Below this Coconino Sandstone is reddish, slope-forming, Permian Hermit Formation, which in turn overlays the Pennsylvanian-Permian Supai Group. Precipitation runoff from this feature drains east into the Colorado River via Nankoweap Creek.

== Gallery ==
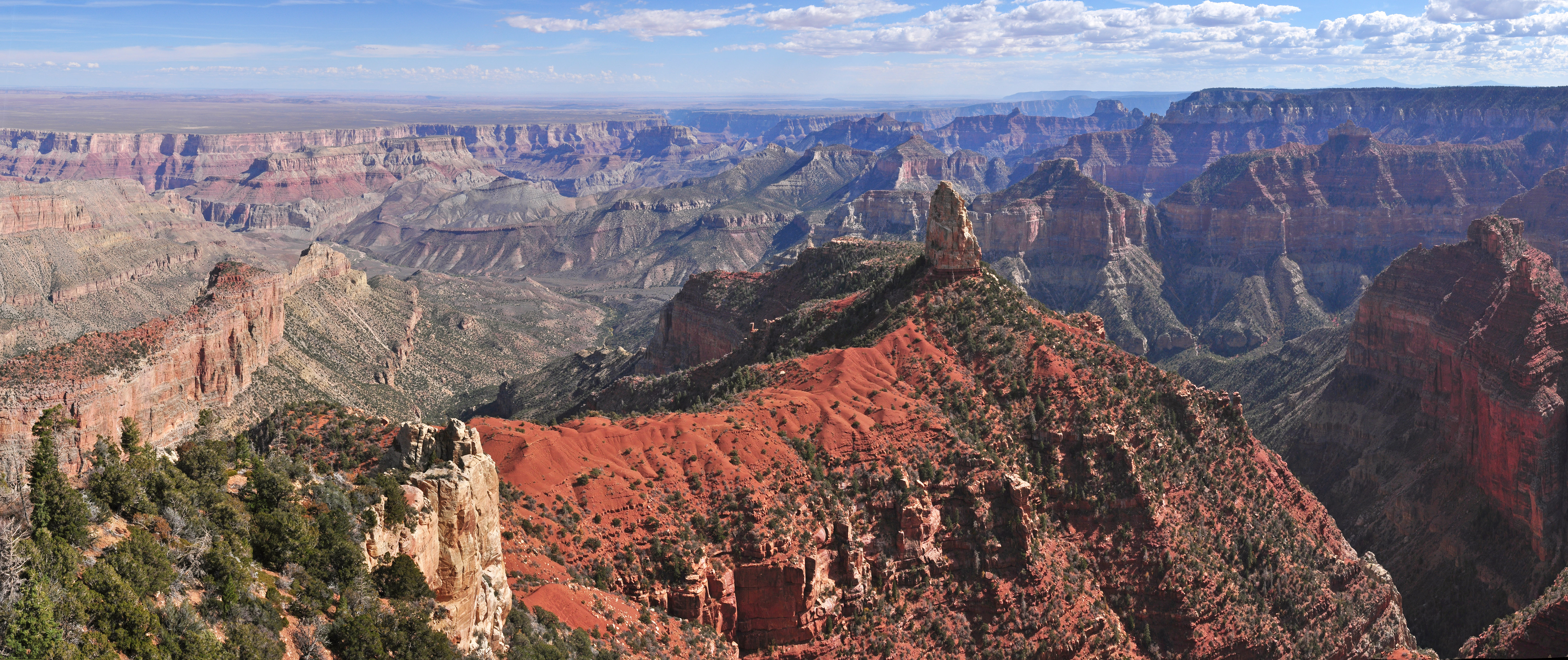

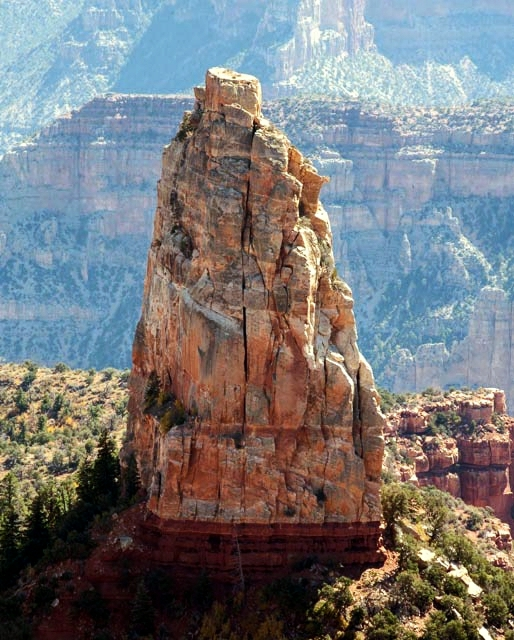

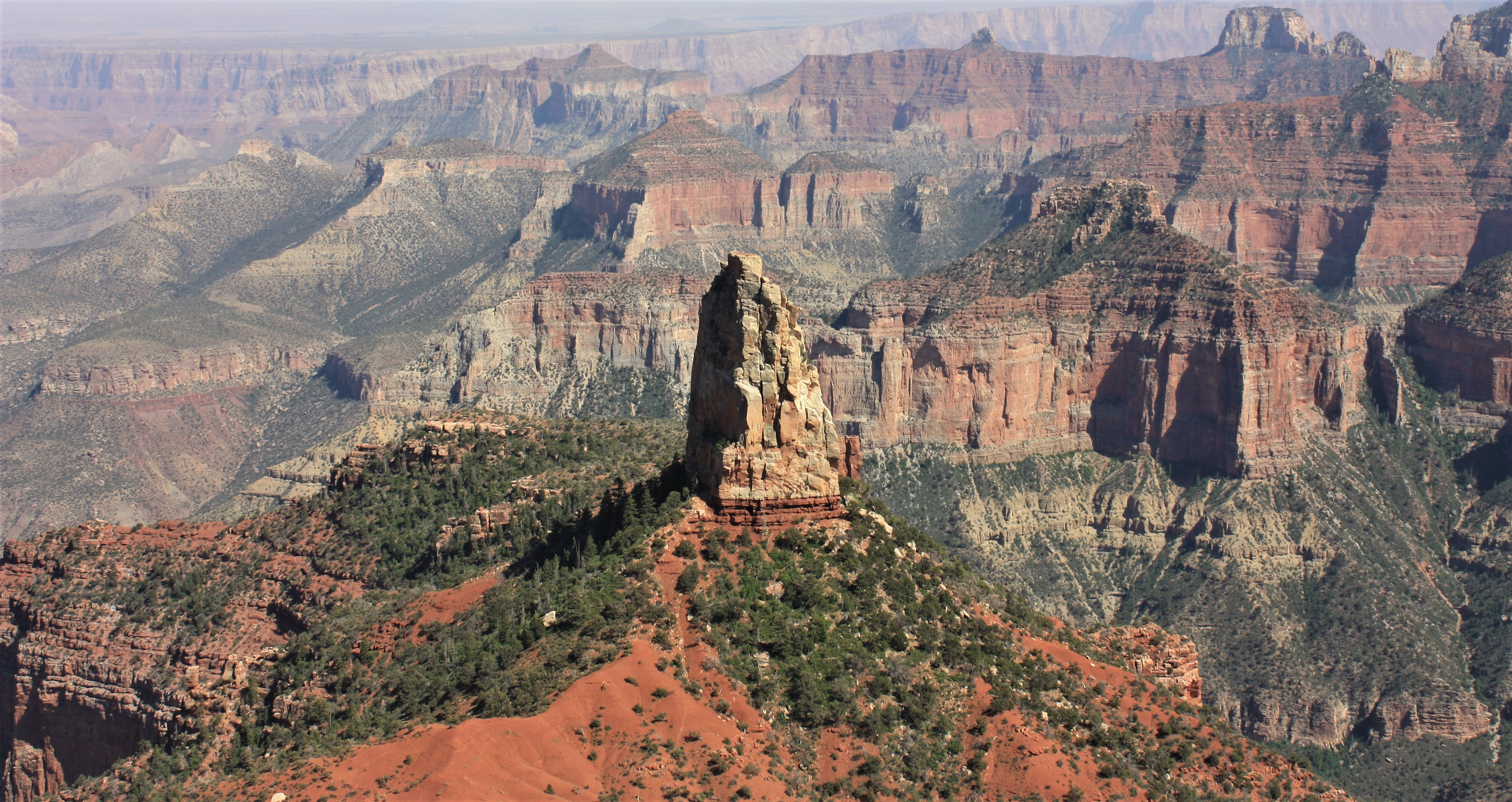

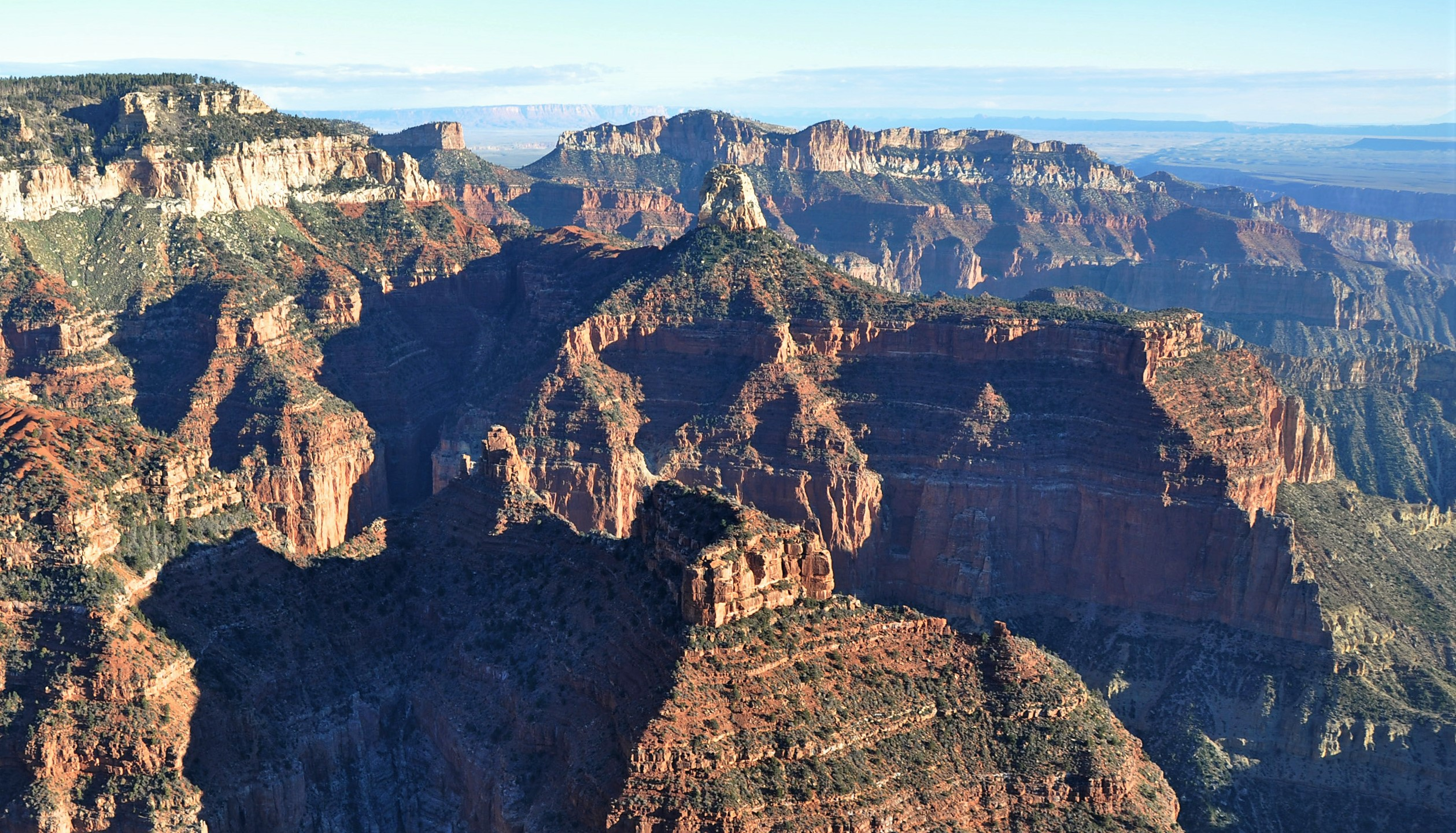
Aerial view looking northeast at Mt. Hayden

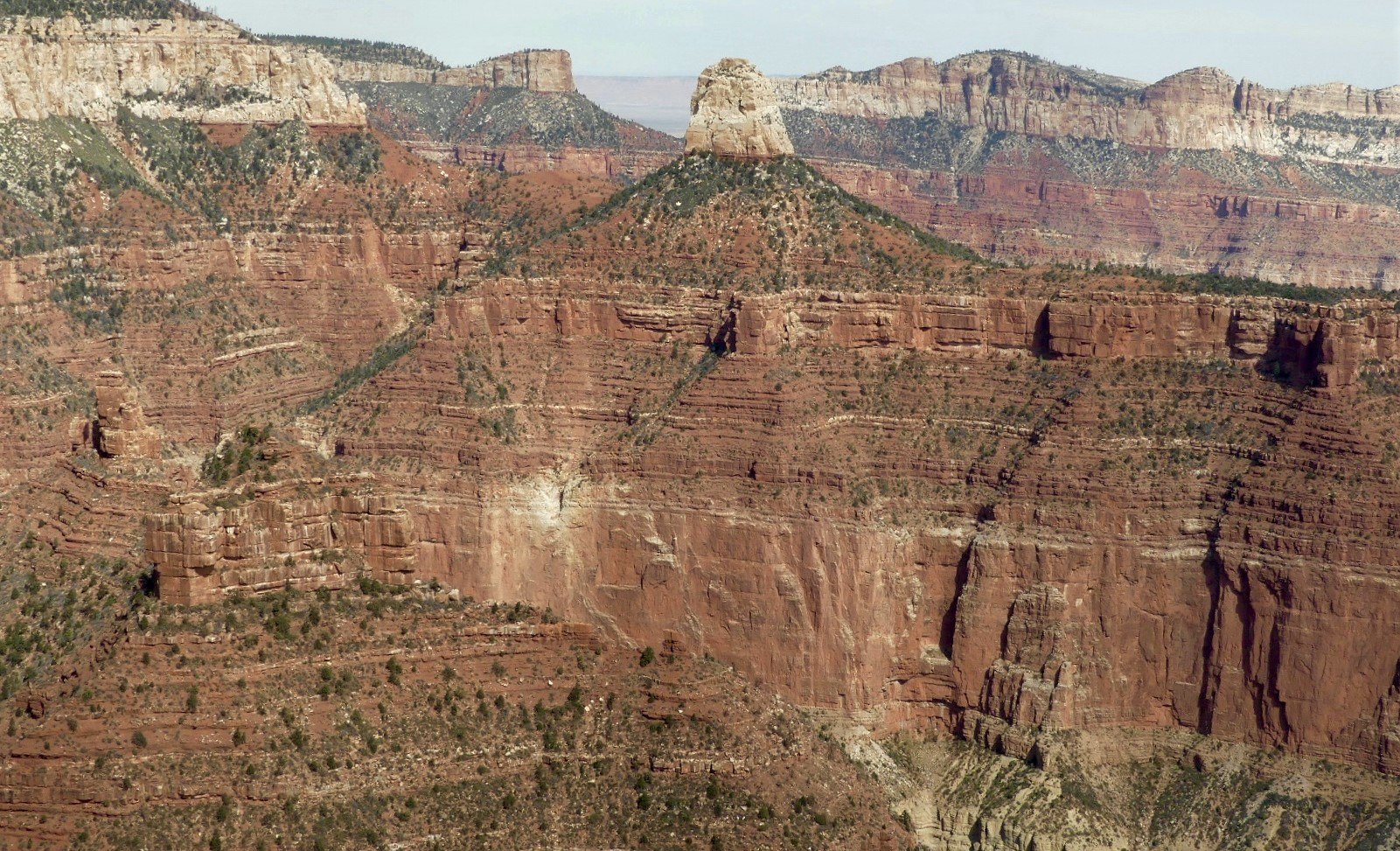
Aerial view of Mt. Hayden centered

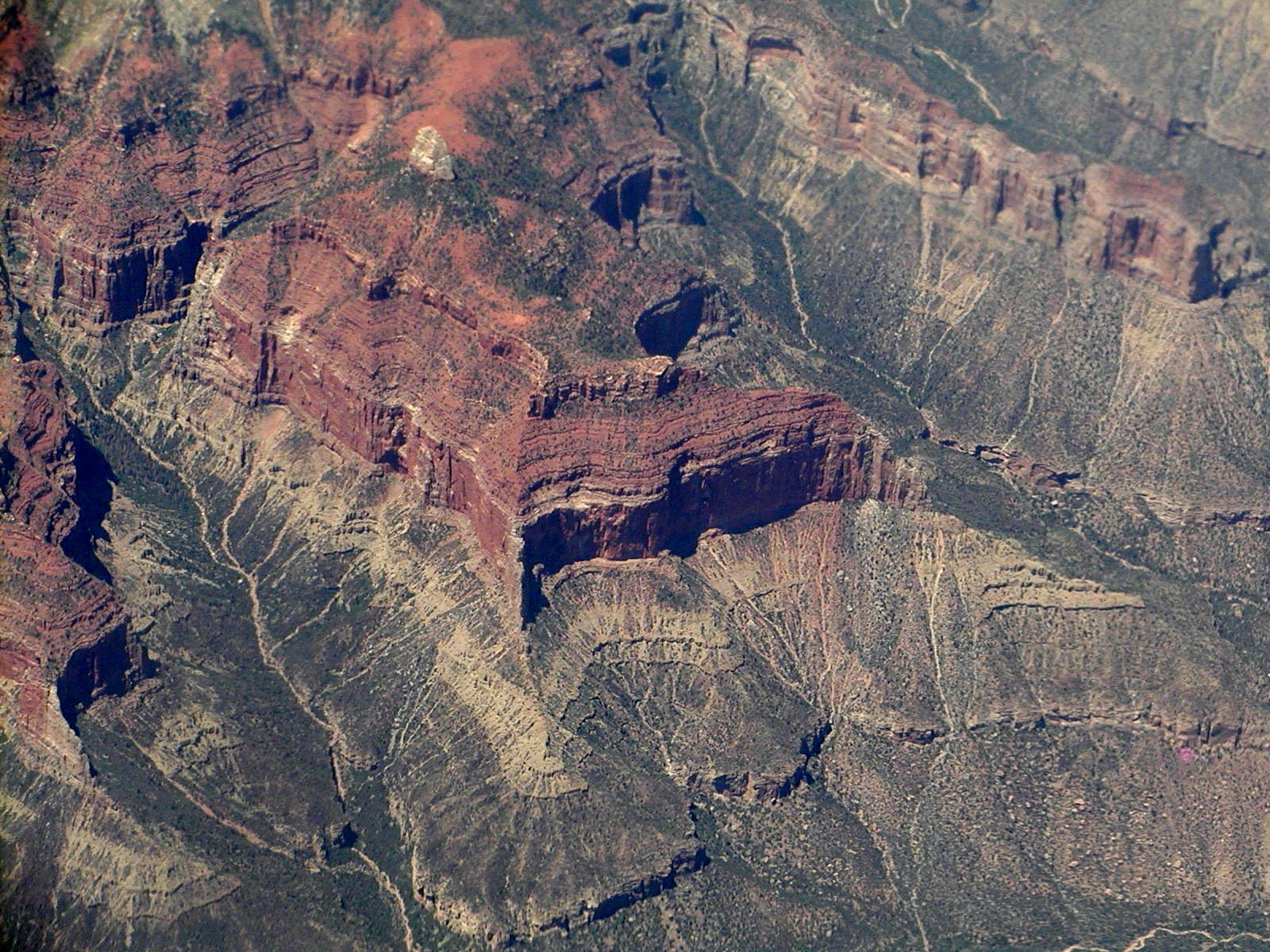
Mt. Hayden from an airplane

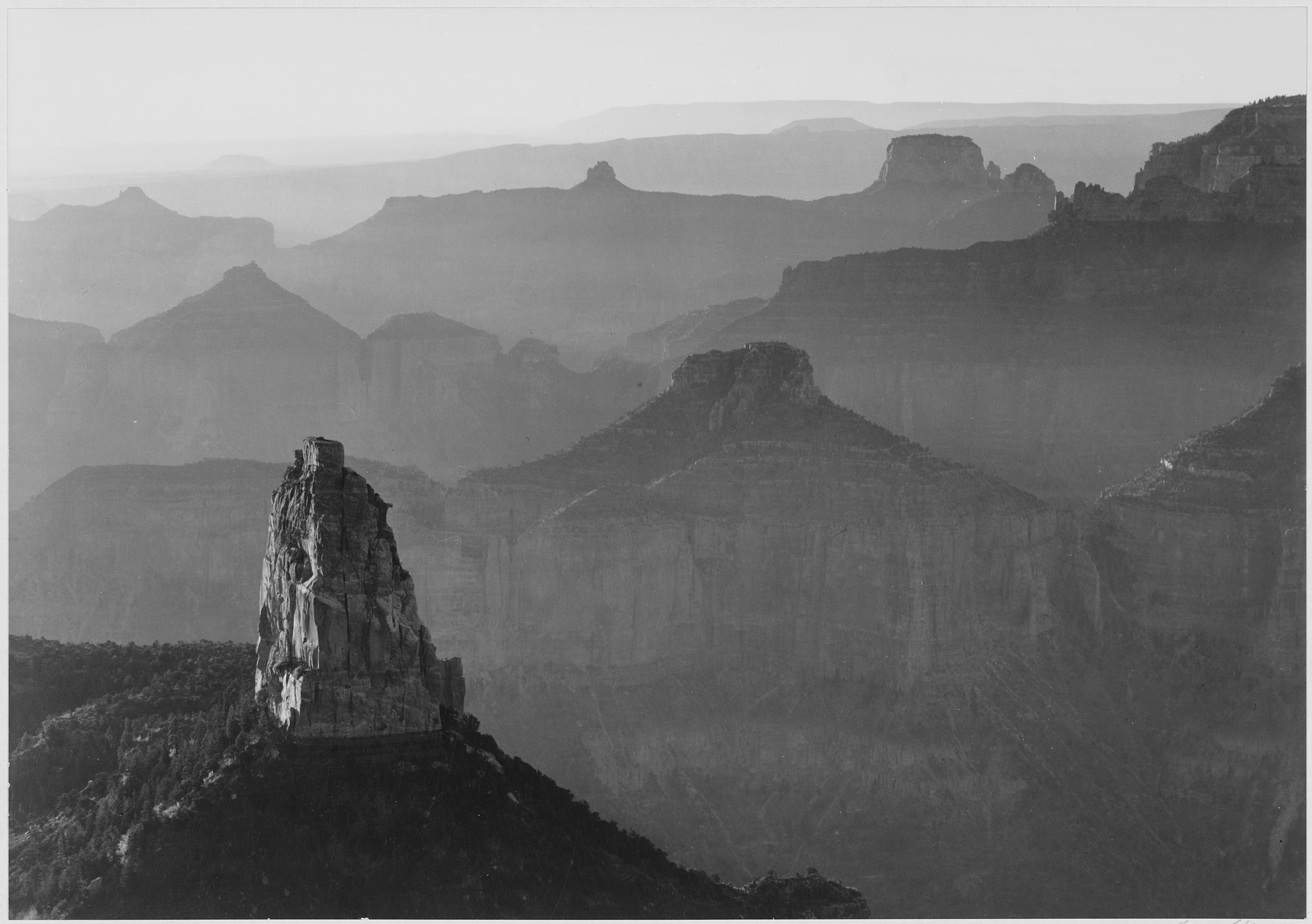
Mt. Hayden (lower left) by Ansel Adams ca. 1942

== See also ==
- Geology of the Grand Canyon area
- Brady Peak
