= Saddle Mountain (Grand Canyon) =

Landform in Coconino County, Arizona

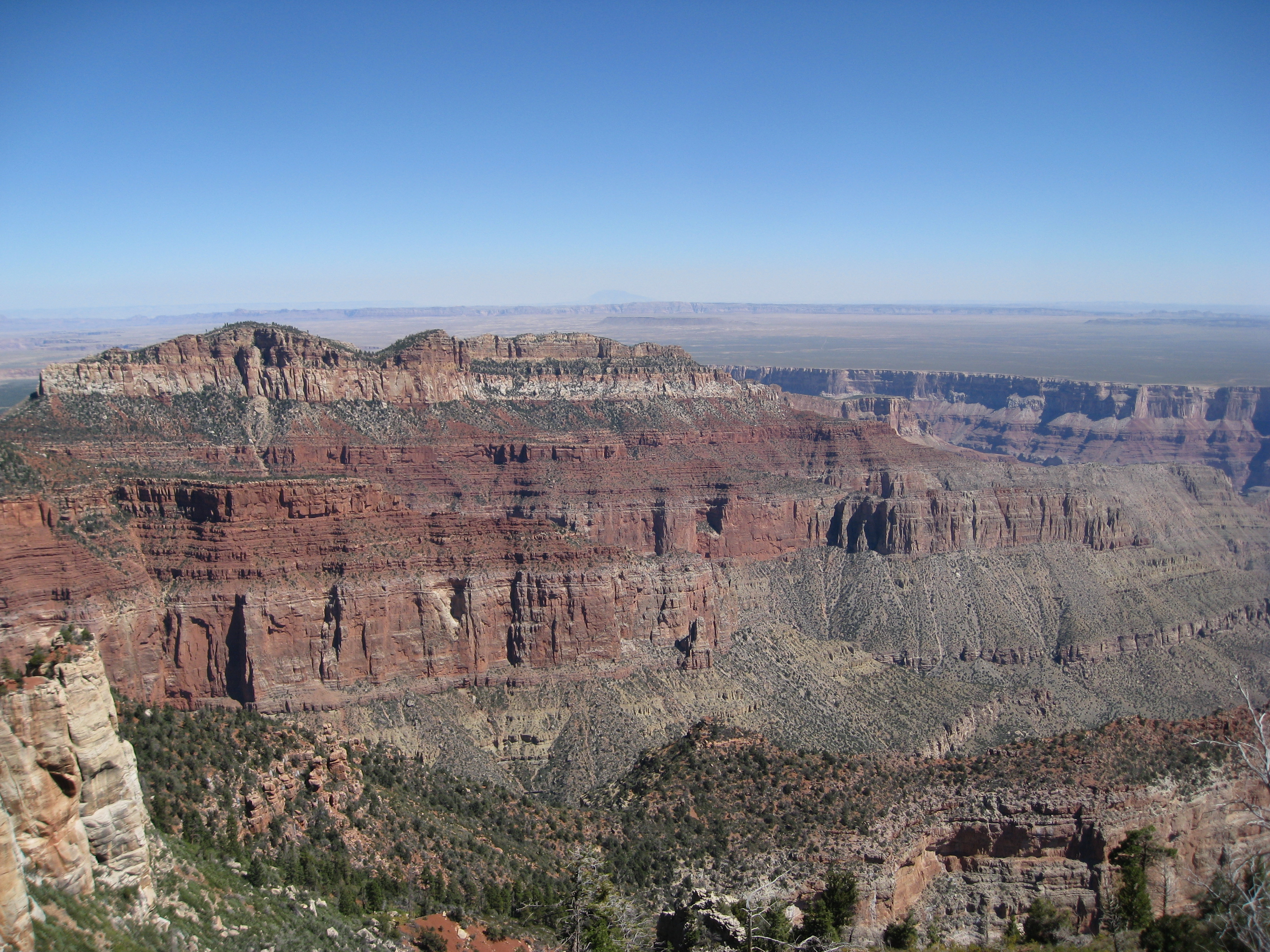
- ~southwest aspect from North Rim, Walhalla Plateau, (Kaibab Plateau)

Highest point
- Elevation: 8,424 ft (2,568 m)
- Prominence: 883 ft (269 m)
- Parent peak: Peak 8881
- Isolation: 2.04 mi (3.28 km)
- Coordinates: 36.3120°N 111.9500°W

Geography
- Location within Arizona Location within the United States
- Location: Grand Canyon National Park; Coconino County, Arizona, US
- Parent range: Kaibab Plateau (Walhalla Plateau); Colorado Plateau
- Topo map: USGS Point Imperial

Geology
- Rock age: Permian-(prominence)
- Mountain type(s): sedimentary rock: limestone, siltstone, mudstone, sandstone, shale
- Rock type(s): Kaibab Limestone, Toroweap Formation, Coconino Sandstone, Hermit Shale, Supai Group, Redwall Limestone, Muav Limestone, Bright Angel Shale

Saddle Mountain (Grand Canyon) is an 8,424-foot-elevation summit located in the eastern Grand Canyon, in Coconino County of northern Arizona, United States. It is the highest peak within Grand Canyon National Park and it forms a portion of the northeast border of the park. Point Imperial, the last viewpoint north, on the Walhalla Plateau, is ~2.0 southwest. Saddle Mountain contains the Saddle Mountain Wilderness, and the Saddle Mountain Wilderness Trail. The short Saddle Creek drains the mountain to the Colorado River (Marble Canyon region), northeast, and the large Nankoweap Creek drainage drains the entire length of the mountain, about 25 mi, to the south, then east.
