= Kaibab Plateau =

Landform in Arizona and Utah, United States

Kaibab
- Buckskin Mountain, Buckskin Plateau, Kaibab Mountain
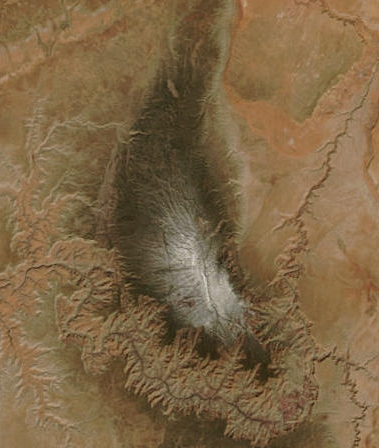
- Kaibab Plateau viewed from space, April 2006

Highest point
- Elevation: 8,701 ft (2,652 m)
- Prominence: 3,580 ft (1,090 m)
- Isolation: 70.44 mi (113.36 km)
- Listing: List of mountain peaks of Arizona
- Coordinates: 36°7′36″N 112°0′32″W

Naming
- Etymology: Southern Paiute word meaning "mountain lying down"

Geography
- Location within Arizona Location within the United States
- Location: Coconino County, Arizona and Kane County, Utah in the United States

The Kaibab Plateau is a plateau almost entirely in Coconino County, Arizona (but extending slightly north into Kane County, Utah) in the Southwestern United States. The high plain is also known as the Buckskin Mountain, Buckskin Plateau, and Kaibab Mountain.

== Description ==
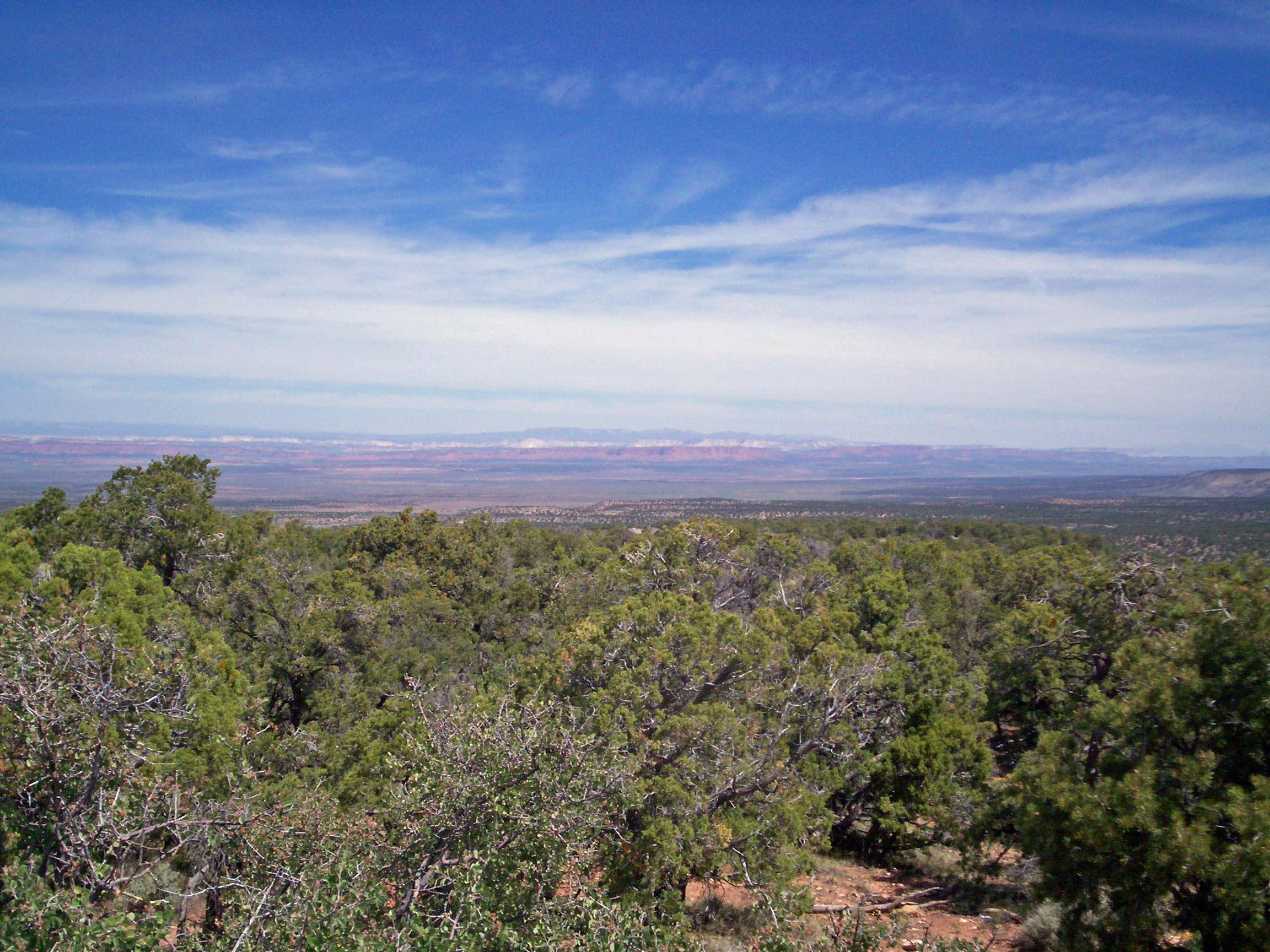
View of the Vermillion Cliffs (to the northeast) from the Kaibab Plateau, June 2008

The plateau, part of the larger Colorado Plateau, is bordered on the south by the Grand Canyon and reaches an elevation of 9,200 feet (2,800 m). The plateau is divided between Kaibab National Forest and the "North Rim" portion of Grand Canyon National Park. Tributary canyons of the Colorado River form the plateau's eastern and western boundaries, and tiers of uplifted cliffs define the northern edges of the landform. Winter snowfall is often heavy (sometimes exceeding 17 feet [5.2 m]), and this creates opportunities for backcountry Nordic skiing and snow camping.

This broad feature is heavily forested with aspen, spruce-fir, ponderosa pine, and pinyon-juniper woodland, and stands in sharp contrast to the arid lowlands encircling it. The cool forests of the plateau are home to the Kaibab squirrel, which is endemic to the region. Other fauna includes deer, turkey, cougar, and bobcat. The Kaibab deer are particularly important because of the changes in their population during the early 1900s. This particular fluctuation is a great example of population engineering and the effects humans can have on nature.

== Physiography ==
The Kaibab Plateau consists of approximately 1,152 square miles (2,980 km^{2}) which are above 6,000 feet (1,800 m). The highest point has an elevation of 9,200 feet (2,800 m), a topographic prominence of 3,580 feet (1,090 m), and a topographic isolation of 70.44 miles (113.36 km). The plateau is bounded on the south by the Grand Canyon of the Colorado River, the elevation in this southern area of the plateau varies from 8,800 feet (2,700 m) to slightly less than 6,000 feet (1,800 m).

The most extensive platform of the plateau is the Esplanade, which is called "Sand Rocks" by local cowboys. This area was formed as a result from weathering of the Hermit shale, which left a hard layer of Permian sandstone exposed. This red sandstone is one of the outstanding features of the plateau.

The plateau's western boundary is the Kanab Creek Canyon which high perpendicular walls form a natural barrier to the movement of most animals. The northwestern boundary of the plateau is marked by a fault line north of the Snake Gulch which is approximately sixteen miles to the east of the Kanab Creek. The eastern boundary is marked by the so-called Houserock Valley, which is a marble platform caused by a monoclinical fold, which strata dips down 2,000 to 3,000 feet.

== Climate ==
Major precipitation events of the Kaibab Plateau consist of thunderstorms in late summer during the summer monsoon season, and snow in winter. Drier weather occurs at other times of the year. There was an average annual precipitation of 26.57 inches (67.5 cm) for the period 1925 to 1936. During winter, snow may be heavy and can accumulate to a depth of 8–10 feet (2.4–3.0 m). June is the driest month of the year, followed by May and early July.

Storms occur several times each week until early September. The highest portions of the plateau are usually touched by snow, and snowstorms usually occur between May and September.

The Kaibab Plateau High Point, 9,213 ft (2,808 m), has a dry-summer humid continental climate (Köppen Dsb), bordering on a dry-summer subalpine climate (Köppen Dsc). Most of the plateau is within the 6b USDA Hardiness Zone (-5°F to 0°F), with the highest elevations in the 6a zone (-10°F to -5°F). There is no weather station at the summit, but this climate table contains interpolated data for an area around the summit.

Climate data for Kaibab Plateau HP 36.3923 N, 112.1498 W, Elevation: 9,150 ft (2,789 m) (1991–2020 normals)
Month	Jan	Feb	Mar	Apr	May	Jun	Jul	Aug	Sep	Oct	Nov	Dec	Year
Mean daily maximum °F (°C)	38.8 (3.8)	39.9 (4.4)	45.6 (7.6)	51.1 (10.6)	60.5 (15.8)	72.8 (22.7)	76.6 (24.8)	74.1 (23.4)	68.2 (20.1)	57.4 (14.1)	46.0 (7.8)	38.2 (3.4)	55.8 (13.2)
Daily mean °F (°C)	27.0 (−2.8)	27.9 (−2.3)	33.0 (0.6)	38.0 (3.3)	46.9 (8.3)	57.5 (14.2)	62.8 (17.1)	60.8 (16.0)	54.4 (12.4)	44.1 (6.7)	34.3 (1.3)	26.8 (−2.9)	42.8 (6.0)
Mean daily minimum °F (°C)	15.3 (−9.3)	15.8 (−9.0)	20.3 (−6.5)	25.0 (−3.9)	33.3 (0.7)	42.2 (5.7)	49.0 (9.4)	47.5 (8.6)	40.7 (4.8)	30.8 (−0.7)	22.6 (−5.2)	15.4 (−9.2)	29.8 (−1.2)
Average precipitation inches (mm)	5.33 (135)	5.01 (127)	4.39 (112)	1.66 (42)	1.17 (30)	0.60 (15)	1.99 (51)	2.91 (74)	1.89 (48)	2.24 (57)	1.88 (48)	2.85 (72)	31.92 (811)
Source: PRISM Climate Group

Dry Park is a Remote Automated Weather Station located 6 miles northwest of the Kaibab Plateau High Point, at an elevation of 8706 ft (2654 m).

Climate data for Dry Park (RAWS), Arizona, 1999–2020 normals: 8706ft (2654m)
Month	Jan	Feb	Mar	Apr	May	Jun	Jul	Aug	Sep	Oct	Nov	Dec	Year
Record high °F (°C)	67 (19)	64 (18)	75 (24)	76 (24)	86 (30)	89 (32)	96 (36)	92 (33)	89 (32)	79 (26)	72 (22)	70 (21)	96 (36)
Mean maximum °F (°C)	59.0 (15.0)	58.7 (14.8)	62.7 (17.1)	69.0 (20.6)	77.9 (25.5)	86.1 (30.1)	88.3 (31.3)	84.5 (29.2)	81.0 (27.2)	72.1 (22.3)	65.5 (18.6)	58.7 (14.8)	88.8 (31.6)
Mean daily maximum °F (°C)	43.0 (6.1)	43.6 (6.4)	49.0 (9.4)	54.3 (12.4)	64.8 (18.2)	76.9 (24.9)	79.0 (26.1)	76.3 (24.6)	70.7 (21.5)	59.6 (15.3)	49.4 (9.7)	41.4 (5.2)	59.0 (15.0)
Daily mean °F (°C)	30.7 (−0.7)	31.3 (−0.4)	36.1 (2.3)	41.4 (5.2)	50.1 (10.1)	60.1 (15.6)	64.3 (17.9)	62.1 (16.7)	56.1 (13.4)	46.3 (7.9)	37.4 (3.0)	29.9 (−1.2)	45.5 (7.5)
Mean daily minimum °F (°C)	18.4 (−7.6)	18.9 (−7.3)	23.3 (−4.8)	28.5 (−1.9)	35.4 (1.9)	43.3 (6.3)	49.6 (9.8)	47.8 (8.8)	41.5 (5.3)	33.0 (0.6)	25.3 (−3.7)	18.4 (−7.6)	32.0 (0.0)
Mean minimum °F (°C)	0.6 (−17.4)	1.1 (−17.2)	7.9 (−13.4)	15.5 (−9.2)	24.1 (−4.4)	32.0 (0.0)	41.4 (5.2)	40.4 (4.7)	29.7 (−1.3)	20.0 (−6.7)	7.2 (−13.8)	1.2 (−17.1)	−4.1 (−20.1)
Record low °F (°C)	−15 (−26)	−8 (−22)	1 (−17)	8 (−13)	17 (−8)	25 (−4)	35 (2)	32 (0)	20 (−7)	2 (−17)	−4 (−20)	−13 (−25)	−15 (−26)
Source: XMACIS2

== Kaibab deer ==
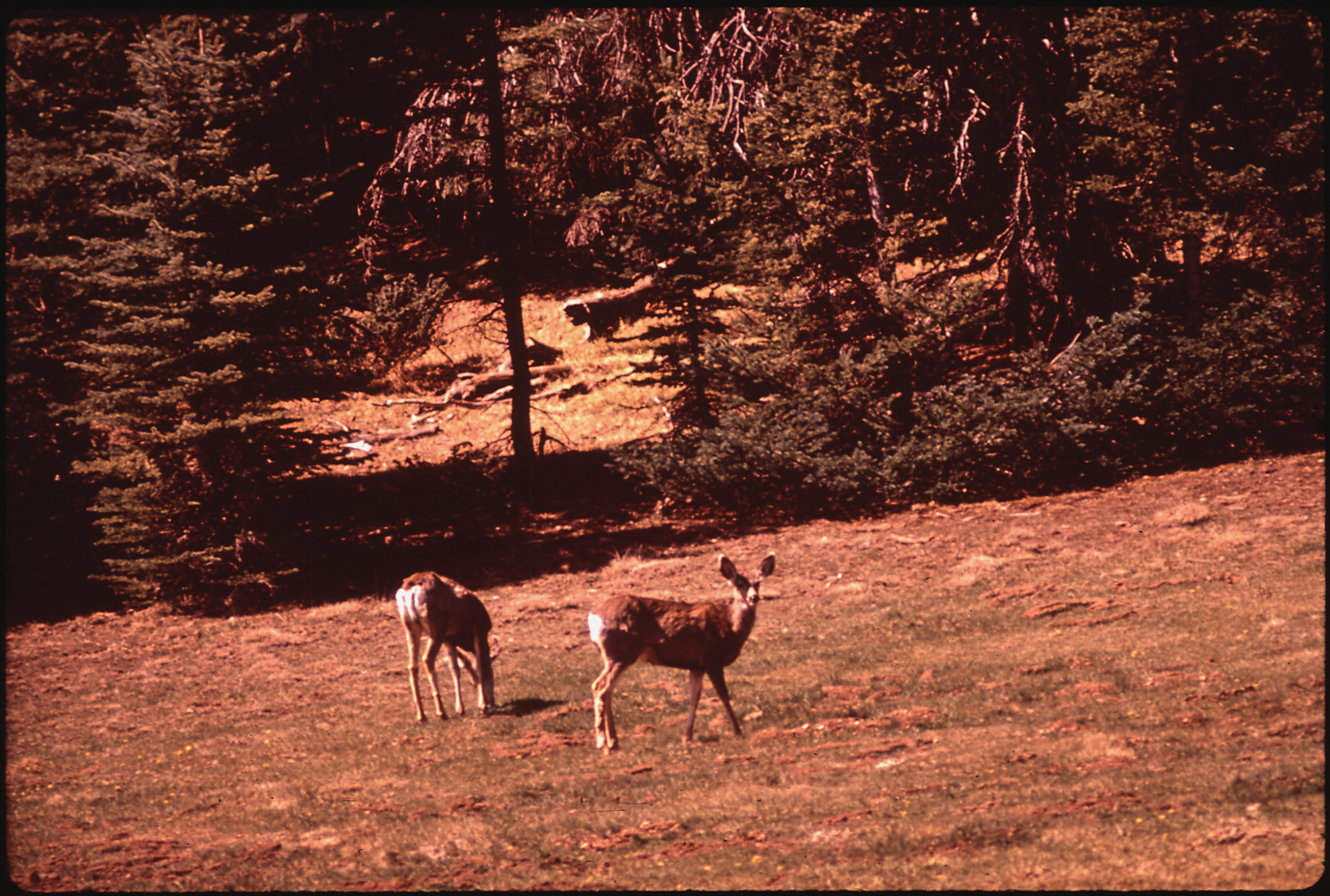
Kaibab deer from the DOCUMERICA series, a program sponsored by the Environmental Protection Agency to photograph subjects of American environmental concern during the 1970s, May 1972 image

At the beginning of the 20th century, the Kaibab Plateau was witness to an interesting experiment in what some might call population engineering. The plateau's pre-1905 population of mule deer was estimated to be around 4,000. This number was never confirmed by any kind of count or survey, and has become an accepted number mainly because no other estimate is available. The average carrying capacity of the land was unknown, in part because this concept was not widely used by naturalists at the time. Years later, Aldo Leopold estimated that the capacity had been about 30,000 deer.

The idea in 1906 was simply to protect and expand the herd, so on November 28, President Theodore Roosevelt created the Grand Canyon National Game Preserve. Overgrazing by herds of sheep, cattle, and horses had taken place on the plateau since the 1880s. During that time, many predators were also killed by ranchers and bounty hunters. By the time Roosevelt established the game preserve, ranchers had moved most domestic livestock elsewhere. The primary change brought by the creation of the game preserve was to ban deer hunting. Government efforts, led by the United States Forest Service, began to protect the deer's numbers by killing off their natural predators once again; to this end, between 1907 and 1939, 816 mountain lions, 20 wolves, 7388 coyotes and over 500 bobcats were reportedly killed.

The deer population experienced a great increase in numbers during the early decades of the 20th century. One estimate put the population as high as 100,000 deer inhabiting the range in 1924. Again, there was no systematic survey to support this estimate, which may have been exaggerated to twice the actual number. Shortly after that time, however, the deer population did begin to decline from over-browsing. By the mid-1920s, many deer were starving to death.

After a heated legal dispute between the federal government and the state of Arizona, hunting was once more permitted, to reduce the deer's numbers. Hunters were able to kill only a small fraction of the starving deer. The range itself was damaged, and its carrying capacity was greatly reduced.

=== Prey and predator population dynamics ===
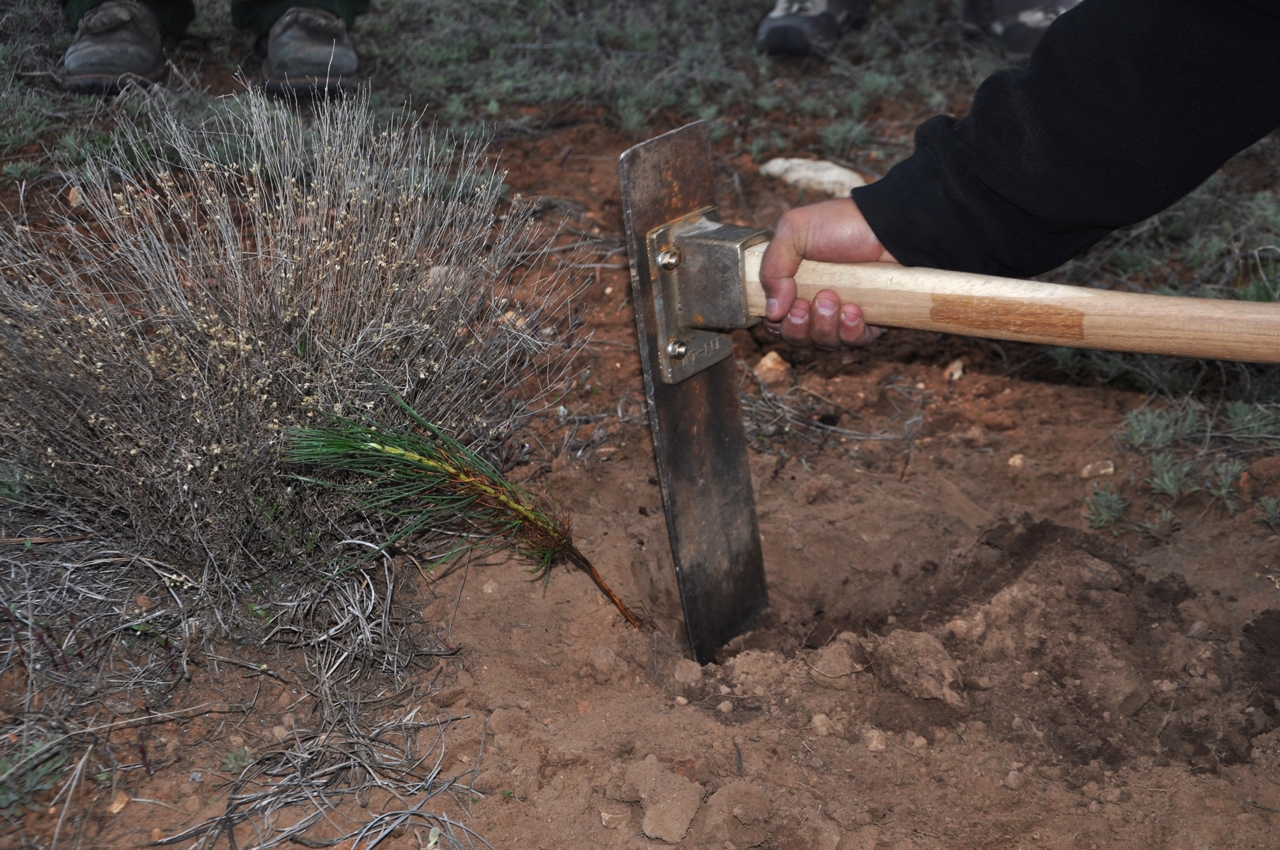
X Fire Tree Planting Restoration Project, Kaibab National Forest, April 2012

Once ecologists began to study the area and reflect on the changes that had occurred there, they began to use the Kaibab deer as a simple lesson about how the removal of the deer's natural predators, which had been done in the interest of preserving the deer population, had allowed the deer to over-reproduce, and quickly overwhelm the plateau's resources. Some ecologists suggested that the situation highlighted the importance of keeping a population in balance with its environment's carrying capacity.

The more meaningful lesson of the Kaibab suggests that human efforts to protect wildlife and preserve wild areas must be balanced with ecological complexity and social priorities that are difficult to predict. Changes take place, sometimes rapidly, but their effects linger for decades. Today, the Arizona Game Commission manages the area, controlling the numbers of deer as well as predators, and issues hunting permits to keep the deer in balance with the range.

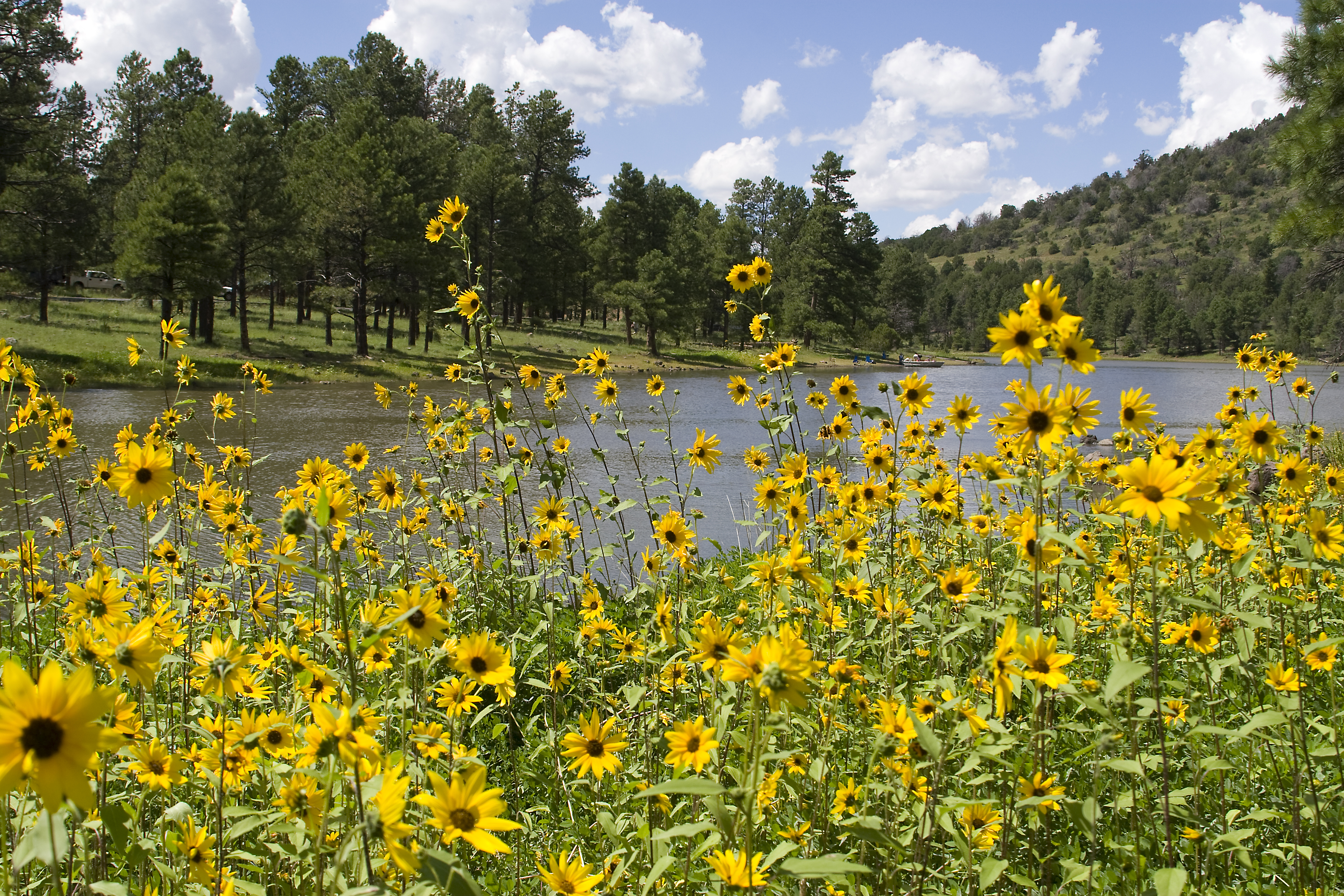
Kaibab Lake in the Williams Ranger District, Kaibab National Forest, August 2020

Although the story of the Kaibab deer rose to fame in the 1920s due to their sudden increase and decrease in population, the story can also be used to demonstrate the way in which scientific studies and ideas about history can help educate current students. The first interpretation of the deer story as demonstrated in textbooks was that predator control had destroyed the deer's population growth. It was thought that initially the high number of deer predators were obtruding the growth of the deer's population, therefore rules were put in place in order to minimize the predator population and allow the deer to increase their population size. However, as scientific studies continued, ecologist Graeme Caughley suggested that predator control alone could not have caused the Kaibab irruption, but rather factors like climate, grazing by other animals, and preservation policies actually had more significant impacts on the deer

Caughley's opinion led to confusion by teachers and scientists over what to include and teach in ecology and biology classes, therefore this story stopped being used as an example of prey and predator population dynamics. This is important to the development of scientific studies because it shows that events—like the Kaibab deer controversy—do not have a definitive start and beginning but include other opinions and approaches which teachers use to showcase the richness of controversy.

In the summers of 2002 and 2003, forest ecologist Dan Binkley and associates undertook a careful analysis of the age structure of aspen stands on the Kaibab. Their work shows that few aspen sprouted successfully on the plateau in the 1920s. They ruled out browsing by domestic livestock or exceptionally dry conditions as causes of that change and concluded that the age structure of aspen in the area was probably due to a period of severe overbrowsing by a large population of deer. This, they write, is consistent with the original assessment of the rapid rise in deer population as a result of persistent predator control. Their contribution of original research is a refreshing addition to the ongoing discussion of predator-prey interactions on the Kaibab. [Binkley, Dan, et al., 2006. "Was Aldo Leopold right about the Kaibab deer herd?" Ecosystems 9: 227–241]

The Kaibab deer controversy has revolutionized the way science is taught in textbooks, and the way students question ecology and biology. In addition, students now learn that human intervention can lead to big repercussions regarding specific animal's population and development in certain regions.

== See also ==
- List of mountain peaks of Arizona
- Kanab Creek Wilderness
- Hoedads Reforestation Cooperative
- Population dynamics
