= Cutler (surname) =

Cutler is a surname meaning "maker of cutlery", and may refer to:

== Business ==
- A. Cutler & Son, American furniture manufacturer known for roll-top desks
- Alexander M. Cutler, American businessman
- Angus Knowles-Cutler, British businessman and politician
- George E. Cutler, American businessman
- James Goold Cutler (1848–1927), mail chute inventor and mayor of Rochester, NY
- May Cutler, Canadian founder of Tundra Books and the first female Mayor of Westmount, Quebec
- Otis H. Cutler (1866–1922), American businessman and politician

== Engineering, science, mathematics and medicine ==
- Adele Cutler, English-born New Zealand and American statistician
- C. Chapin Cutler, United States electrical engineer
- Charles R. Cutler, United States industrial engineer
- Dave Cutler, software engineer
- Elliott Cutler, American surgeon and medical educator
- Hugh Carson Cutler (1912–1998), American botanist
- John Charles Cutler, surgeon, manager in United States Public Health Service
- Leonard Cutler, authority on ultra-precise timekeeping devices and standards
- Sean Cutler, professor of biology and chemistry

== Law, politics, and diplomacy ==
- Arthur Roden Cutler, Australian diplomat and war hero
- Augustus W. Cutler, United States politician and lawyer
- Bruce Cutler, United States criminal defense lawyer
- Bruce R. Cutler, American politician in Utah
- Bryan Cutler, Pennsylvania politician
- Charles Cutler, Australian politician
- Dana Tippin Cutler, American lawyer and news personality
- Elisha Cutler Jr., American politician
- Elliot Cutler, American lawyer
- Ephraim Cutler, United States politician
- Horace Cutler, British politician
- John Christopher Cutler, second governor of the U.S. state of Utah
- Lloyd Cutler, attorney
- Nathan Cutler, United States politician
- Reed F. Cutler, United States politician
- Robert Barry Cutler, Canadian politician
- Robert M. Cutler, Nova Scotia merchant and politician
- Sir Roden Cutler, an Australian diplomat
- Robert Cutler, U.S. administrator
- Stephen M. Cutler, American lawyer
- Thomas Cutler (Canadian politician), Nova Scotia lawyer and politician
- Walter L. Cutler, American diplomat
- William P. Cutler, United States politician

== Music ==
- Adge Cutler, British musician
- Chris Cutler, English musician
- Eric Cutler, United States musician
- Joe Cutler, British composer
- Jon Cutler, United States house DJ
- Mark Cutler, United States singer/songwriter
- Miriam Cutler, American composer
- Sam Cutler, former tour manager for The Rolling Stones
- Scott Cutler, songwriter and musician

== Visual and performing arts ==
- Joyce Cutler–Shaw (1932–2018) American multidisciplinary artist
- Kate Cutler, English singer and actress
- Katherine Cutler, American architect
- Matthew Cutler, English dancer
- Nicole Cutler, British ballroom dancer

== Religion ==
- Alpheus Cutler, Latter Day Saint leader
- Jerome Cutler, rabbi
- Manasseh Cutler, American clergyman
- Timothy Cutler, United States Episcopal clergyman

== Sports ==
- Arthur Cutler (cricketer), New Zealand cricketer
- Bill Cutler (baseball executive), American baseball executive
- Robert B. Cutler, American Olympic rower and conspiracy theorist
- Dave Cutler (Canadian football), Canadian football player
- Eric Cutler (footballer), English footballer
- Jay Cutler, quarterback
- Jay Cutler (bodybuilder)
- Kenny Cutler, United States soccer player
- Lee Cutler (born 1995), English professional boxer
- Lester Cutler, American sprint canoer
- Marcus Cutler, American football coach
- Neil Cutler, English footballer
- Paul Cutler (born 1946), English footballer
- Stan Cutler (rugby league), Australian former professional rugby league footballer
- Steve Cutler, Australian rugby player
- Tim Cutler, Australian cricketer
- Tom Cutler (born 1995), Australian rules footballer
- Trent Cutler, Australian rugby league player
- Wes Cutler, Canadian football player

== Writers ==
- Ivor Cutler, Scottish poet
- Jane Cutler, American writer
- Jessica Cutler, journalist
- Judith Cutler, British writer
- Lizzie Petit Cutler, American writer

== Fictional characters ==
- Special Agent Cutler, a character in the British comic book series MPH
- Wolfgang Cutler, a character on the television series Oz

== Other ==
- Allan Cutler, Canadian sponsorship scandal whistleblower
- Casey Cutler, United States criminal
- Craig Cutler, American photographer
- David Cutler, economist
- Hannah Tracy Cutler, abolitionist, temperance and women's suffrage activist
- Helen Cutler, Australian charity worker and patron
- John Cutler (disambiguation), several people
- Lysander Cutler, Union Army general
- R. J. Cutler, United States television- and film-maker
