= Cutler =

A cutler is a maker of cutlery.

Cutler may also refer to:

== People ==
- Cutler (surname)
- Cutler J. Cleveland, scientist

== Geography ==
=== United Kingdom ===
- Cutlers Ait, island in the River Thames
- Cutler Heights, district of Bradford, West Yorkshire, England
- Cutlers Green, hamlet in Essex, England
  - Cutlers Green Halt railway station

=== United States ===
- Cutler, California, a town
  - Cutler-Orosi Joint Unified School District
- Cutler, Florida, now part of the Village of Palmetto Bay
- Cutler Bay, Florida, formerly known as Cutler Ridge
- Cutler, Illinois
- Cutler, Indiana
- Cutler Township, Franklin County, Kansas
- Cutler, Maine, a town
  - Cutler Regional Airport
  - VLF Transmitter Cutler, a transmission site for the US Navy
- Cutler, Minnesota, an unincorporated community
- Cutler, Ohio, an unincorporated community
- Cutler, Wisconsin, a town
- Cutler (community), Wisconsin, an unincorporated community
- Cutler and Porter Block, historic city block in Springfield, Massachusetts
- Cutler Botanic Garden, in Binghamton, New York
- Cutler Burial Mound, Charles Deering Estate, Palmetto Bay, Florida
- Cutler Fossil Site, Charles Deering Estate, Palmetto Bay, Florida
- Cutler Park, in Needham, Massachusetts
- Cutler Park (Visalia, California), municipal park
- The Cutler River (New Hampshire), on Mount Washington
- Cutler Majestic Theatre, an opera house, Boston, Massachusetts
- Cutler Memorial Library, an historic library in Farmington, Maine
- Cutler Reservoir, in Utah
- Cutler School (New York), college preparatory school
- Cutler's Park, short-lived Mormon settlement in what is now Nebraska
- Cutler–Donahoe Bridge, Madison County, Iowa
- Carl C. Cutler Middle School, Mystic, Connecticut
- Manasseh Cutler Hall, Ohio University
- Old Cutler Road, in Miami-Dade County, Florida
- Thomas R. Cutler Mansion, historic home in Lehi, Utah

=== Elsewhere ===
- Cutler Stack, sea stack in the South Shetland Islands
- Roden Cutler House, office building in Sydney, Australia
- Cutlers Beach, Wonthaggi Heathlands, Bass Coast, Victoria

== Music ==
- The Cutler, an electronica group

== Companies ==
- Cutler Mail Chute Company, a mail chute manufacturer
- Cutler and Gross, luxury eyewear brand
- David Cutler Group, housebuilding company now known as Hudson Palmer Homes

== Other ==
- Cutler Formation, a rock unit in the southwestern United States
- MV Lady Cutler, inner harbor ferry in Sydney, Australia
- Lord Cutler Beckett, an antagonist in the Pirates of the Caribbean film series

== See also ==
- Company of Cutlers in Hallamshire
  - Cutlers' Hall
  - Master Cutler
- Cutler's bar notation
- Cutler's resin
- Master Cutler (train)
- Worshipful Company of Cutlers, London
