= Lynne Barasch =

American children's illustrator and writer (1939–2024)

- Born: March 23, 1939; New York City, New York, US
- Died: March 7, 2024 (aged 84); New York City, New York, US
- Education: Parsons School of Design (BFA, 1976)
- Occupations: Children's book illustrator and author
- Spouse: Kenneth Robert Barash (m. 1958–2021)
- Children: 5

Lynne Barasch (1939–2024) was an American children's book illustrator and author. Her first book, Rodney’s Inside Story, was published with Orchard Books in 1992. Other books include Radio Rescue (2000) and Hiromi's Hands (2007). Radio Rescue was a 2001 ALA Notable Children's Book for Younger Readers. Hiromi's Hands received an Honorable Mention from the 2008 Asian/Pacific American Awards for Literature, and was selected for the Amelia Bloomer Booklist.

Lynne Barasch was born in New York City on March 23, 1939, to Robert Julius and Elaine Marx, but grew up in Woodmere, New York. She studied at Rhode Island School of Design in the late 1950s before earning a Bachelor of Fine Arts from Parsons School of Design in 1976.

Barasch married ophthalmologist Kenneth Robert Barash on June 20, 1958. They couple had five children.

At the end of her life, Barasch lived in New York City with her husband, though Kenneth died circa 2021. Barasch died on March 7, 2024, at the age of 84.

Barasch was Jewish.

== Publications ==
=== As author and illustrator ===
- Rodney's Inside Story, Orchard Books (New York, NY), 1992.
- A Winter Walk, Ticknor & Fields (New York, NY), 1993.
- Old Friends, Farrar, Straus & Giroux (New York, NY), 1998.
- Radio Rescue, Frances Foster Books (New York, NY), 2000.
- The Reluctant Flower Girl, HarperCollins (New York, NY), 2001.
- Knockin' on Wood: Starring Peg Leg Bates, Lee & Low Books (New York, NY), 2004.
- A Country Schoolhouse, Farrar, Straus & Giroux (New York, NY), 2004.
- Ask Albert Einstein, Farrar, Straus & Giroux (New York, NY), 2005.
- Hiromi's Hands, Lee & Low Books (New York, NY), 2006.
- First Come to the Zebra, Lee & Low Books (New York, NY), 2009.

=== As illustrator ===
- Commonsense and Fowls (written by Jane Cutler), Farrar, Straus & Giroux (New York, NY), 2005.
- Owney, the Mail Pouch Pooch (written by Mona Kerby), Farrar, Straus & Giroux (New York, NY), 2008.
