= Coulter =

Coulter may refer to:

== People ==
- Coulter (surname)
- Coulter Osborne (1934–2023), Canadian arbitrator and former Associate Chief Justice of Ontario

== Places ==
- Coulter, South Lanarkshire, Scotland, a village and civil parish
- Coulter, Iowa, United States, a city
- Coulter, Pennsylvania, United States, an unincorporated community
- Coulter Brook, New York, United States
- Mount Coulter, Queen Elizabeth Land, Antarctica
- Coulter Glacier, Alexander Island, Antarctica
- Coulter Heights, Marie Byrd Land, Antarctica
- 18776 Coulter, an asteroid

== Other uses ==
- Coulter (agriculture), a part of a plow or seed drill
- Coulter Field, a public airfield in Texas
- Coulter Field (Bishop's), Quebec, Canada, a Bishop's University stadium
- Coulter Flats, also known as The Coulter, an apartment building in Indianapolis, Indiana, United States, on the National Register of Historic Places
- Coulter railway station, Coulter, South Lanarkshire, Scotland
- Coulter's, a defunct Los Angeles department store
- Coulter's Candy, a Scottish folk song

== See also ==
- Coulter counter, an apparatus for counting and sizing particles suspended in electrolytes
- Cutler (disambiguation)
- Colter (disambiguation)
