= Ferdinand Bury =

Parisian cabinetmaker

Ferdinand Bury (1740–1795) was a Parisian cabinetmaker (ébéniste) during the reign of Louis XVI. So renowned was he that until the first part of the nineteenth century, contemporaries and collectors referred to him simply as Ferdinand. He collaborated with the finest cabinetmakers of his age, including Jean-Henri Riesener, Martin Carlin, and Jean-Baptiste Tuart. According to the Count de Salverte, "Le soin que Ferdinand Bury apportait a ses travaux lui merita du succes."

Bury became a master in the guild of ebenistes in 1774 and set up shop in the Faubourg Saint-Antoine in Paris. A German, he employed German workers. Apparently hot-tempered, he once started a drunken brawl with the merchants in the shop next door. Bad investments and the French Revolution ruined him, and Bury declared bankruptcy late in 1789. His richly decorated pieces, such as cylinder desks, were collected by the rich and famous, including several of the Rothschild family, and can sell today for as much as half a million dollars.
