= Culter =

Culter may refer to:

- Culter, South Lanarkshire, Scotland, United Kingdom
- Culter (fish), a genus of cyprinid fish
- Culter F.C., a junior football club from the village of Peterculter, Aberdeen, Scotland
- Culter School, a primary school in Aberdeen
- Maryculter, a village near Aberdeen
- Peterculter, commonly shortened to Culter, a suburb of Aberdeen

== See also ==
- Coulter (disambiguation)
