= Stan Cutler =

Stan Cutler may refer to:

- Stan Cutler (rugby league)
- Stan Cutler (screenwriter)
