= A. Cutler & Son =

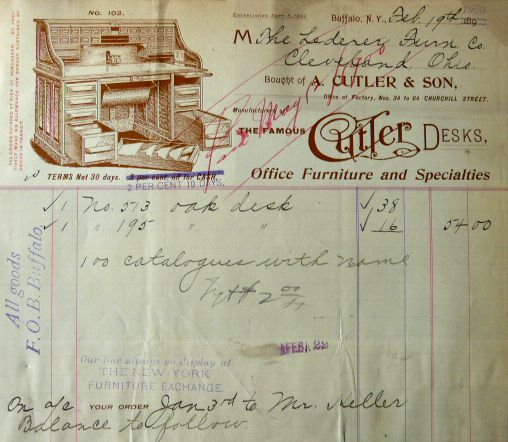

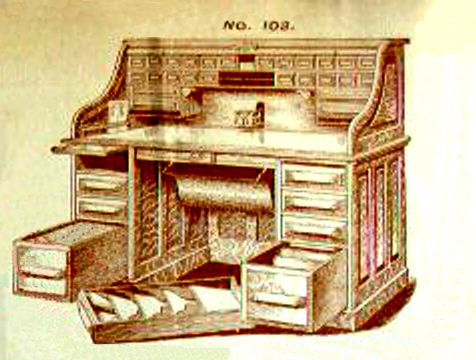

Abner Cutler & Son were cabinetmakers in Buffalo, New York who started production in the late 1820s. The firm specialised in rolltop desks and was granted seven patents related to the desk's mechanism. The company was known as 'Cutler & Son' by the 1870s and exhibited some desks at the 1876 Philadelphia Centennial Exhibition. By the early 1900s, the firm was known as the 'Cutler Desk Co.' In 1930, it was taken over by the Sikes Chair Co., also of Buffalo.

The US Patent Office issued a patent for the first American-made rolltop desk to Abner Cutler of Buffalo, NY in 1882. Similar desks had been seen in the United States and Europe before Cutler's patent. The cylinder desk was a predecessor of the rolltop, and had been in use in Europe in the 1700s, but warping of the top was common as it was made from a single piece of wood. The tambour desk may also be considered an early rolltop even though the work surface was only partly covered by the top. The rolltop became a standard item of the Victorian office. Cutler's company flourished until around 1919, when the rolltop design declined in popularity and was replaced by Art Nouveau and Art Deco styles.

Abner Cutler was born at Paris, Oneida County, N. Y., in 1802 and was the sixth child of Joseph and Dothea Judd. He spent his childhood on a farm and when sixteen years old was apprenticed for three years to Silas Sikes, a cabinet maker of Clinton, New York. After this he was employed by Thomas Constantine in New York where he learnt the trade of cabinet-making. From there he worked in Chittenango, New York, and in 1824 started out on his own. He went into partnership with a Mr. Stearns of Mendon, New York, and they established themselves as cabinet makers at Black Rock near Buffalo, and were soon marketing "fall-leaf" tables.

== Marriage and children ==
The founder of the firm, Abner Cutler (1802 - 29 May 1891, Buffalo, New York), was the son of Joseph Cutler (1748-1827) and Dothea Judd (1760-1833). His first wife, whom he married on 21 January 1828 in Paris, New York, was Lydia Grey (1808-1873) and their son Frederick Hudson Cutler (1843-1897), one of seven children, was a partner in the firm. Frederick was married to Ella Amelia Smith. Abner's second wife, whom he married in 1876, was a Mrs Gilmore (1821-1892).
