= Jon Cutler =

Jon Cutler may refer to:

- Jon Cutler (musician)

== See also ==
- John Cutler (disambiguation)
