= Colter =

Colter may refer to:

- Colter Butte, a summit in the Grand Canyon
- Colter's Hell, a thermal area at the mouth of the Shoshone's canyon in Wyoming
- Colter Peak, a mountain peak in Yellowstone National Park

== People ==
- Colter Bean (born 1977), American baseball pitcher
- Colter Dane (born 1991), American Entrepreneur, Race Car Driver
- Fred Colter (1879–1944), Arizona politician
- Jessi Colter (born 1943), American country music singer
- John Colter (1774–1813), American trapper
- Mary Colter (1869–1958), American architect
- Mike Colter (born 1976), American actor
- Zeb Colter (born 1949), ring name of American professional wrestler Wayne Keown

== See also ==
- Coulter (disambiguation)
