= Paul Cutler =

Paul Cutler may refer to:

- Paul Cutler (footballer), English footballer
- Paul B. Cutler, American producer and guitarist
- Paul A. Cutler, member of the Utah House of Representatives
