= John Cutler =

John Cutler may refer to:

== Politicians ==
- John Cutler alias Carwithan (died 1467?), English politician and member of parliament
- Sir John Cutler, 1st Baronet (1607–1693), English alderman and MP for Taunton and Bodmin
- John Cutler (MP for Huntingdon) (fl. 1395), member of parliament for Huntingdon
- John Christopher Cutler (1846–1928), second governor of the U.S. state of Utah

== Others ==
- John Cutler (sailor) (born 1962), New Zealand yachtsman
- John Charles Cutler (1915–2003), American researcher involved in medical studies of syphilis
- Jon Cutler (born 1969), American house DJ
- John Garrison Cutler (1833–1913), African American entrepreneur and hotelier in New Hampshire

== See also ==
- Jon Cutler (disambiguation)
- Cutler (disambiguation)
