= Dave Cutler (disambiguation) =

Dave Cutler is a software engineer, designer and developer of several operating systems.

Dave or David Cutler may also refer to:

- Dave Cutler (Canadian football) (born 1945), place kicker with the Edmonton Eskimos
- David Cutler (born 1965), economist and professor at Harvard University
- David Cutler Group, housebuilding company now known as Hudson Palmer Homes
- David Cutler (bowls) (born 1954), British bowler
- David F. Cutler (born 1939), British botanist
