= Rolltop =

Rolltop may refer to

- Rolltop desk
- A type of equestrian horse jump
