= Swilling Butte =

Ridgeline summit in the Grand Canyon

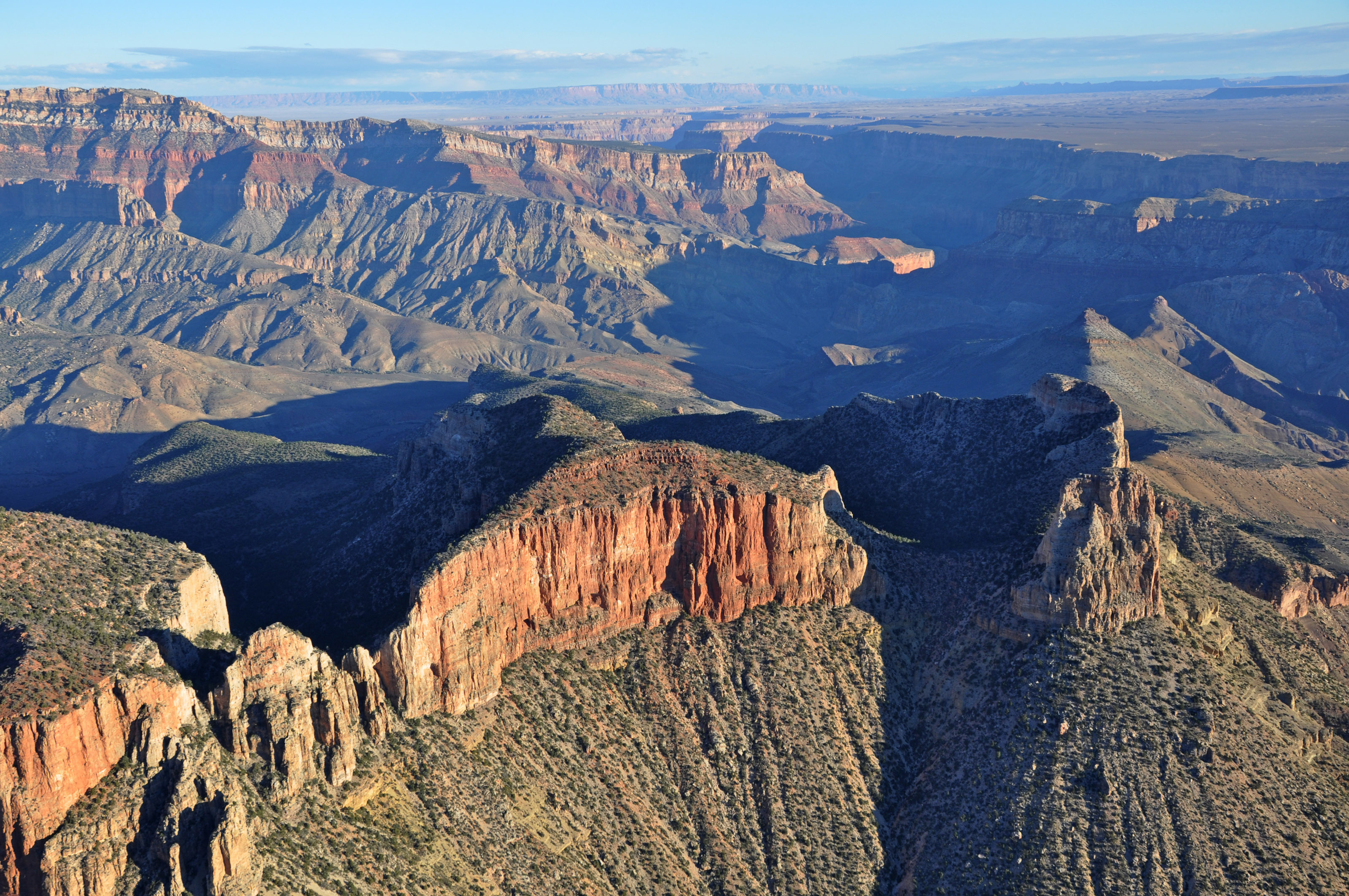

Highest point
- Elevation: 6,785 ft (2,068 m)
- Prominence: 485 ft (148 m)
- Parent peak: Colter Butte
- Isolation: 0.63 mi (1.01 km)
- Coordinates: 36°14′18″N 111°54′29″W

Naming
- Etymology: John Swilling

Geography
- Location within Arizona Location within the United States
- Location: Grand Canyon National Park; Coconino County, Arizona, US
- Parent range: Kaibab Plateau (Walhalla Plateau); Colorado Plateau
- Topo map: USGS Walhalla Plateau

Geology
- Rock age: Permian-Pennsylvanian down to Cambrian
- Mountain type(s): sedimentary rock: sandstone, siltstone, mudstone, limestone, shale
- Rock type(s): Supai Group-(debris remainder, prominence), Supai Group, Redwall Limestone, Tonto Group-(3 units); 2_Muav Limestone, 1_Bright Angel Shale

Swilling Butte is a 6,785-foot (2,068 m)-elevation ridgeline summit located in the eastern Grand Canyon, in Coconino County of northern Arizona, United States. The landform is in a group of nearby summits, Colter Butte, west, and Hutton and Duppa Buttes, east. All four buttes are at the north of the east-flowing Kwagunt Creek and Canyon drainage to the Colorado River. Swilling Butte is 3.0 miles (4.8 km) northeast of Atoko Point, East Rim of the Walhalla Plateau (Kaibab Plateau, North Rim), and 4.0 miles (6.4 km) west of the (north)-East Rim, Grand Canyon; the south-flowing Colorado River is west and adjacent to the East Rim. Swilling Butte is a triangular-platform summit of bright-red, tall Redwall Limestone. Being a cliff-former, the Redwall is also a platform-former. The upper platform of the Redwall Limestone supports a remainder-debris of the Supai Group (a 4-unit group). Of the two lower units, no. 2 is a cliff-former, hard rocks (cliffs), of the Manakacha Formation; the slope-former, (unit no. 1), the Watahomigi Formation, forms most of the Supai debris upon the Redwall. Below the Redwall Limestone are members of the Cambrian Tonto Group, the Muav Limestone and the slopes of the Bright Angel Shale.
