= Milton, Albemarle County, Virginia =

Unincorporated community in Virginia, United States

Milton
- Unincorporated community
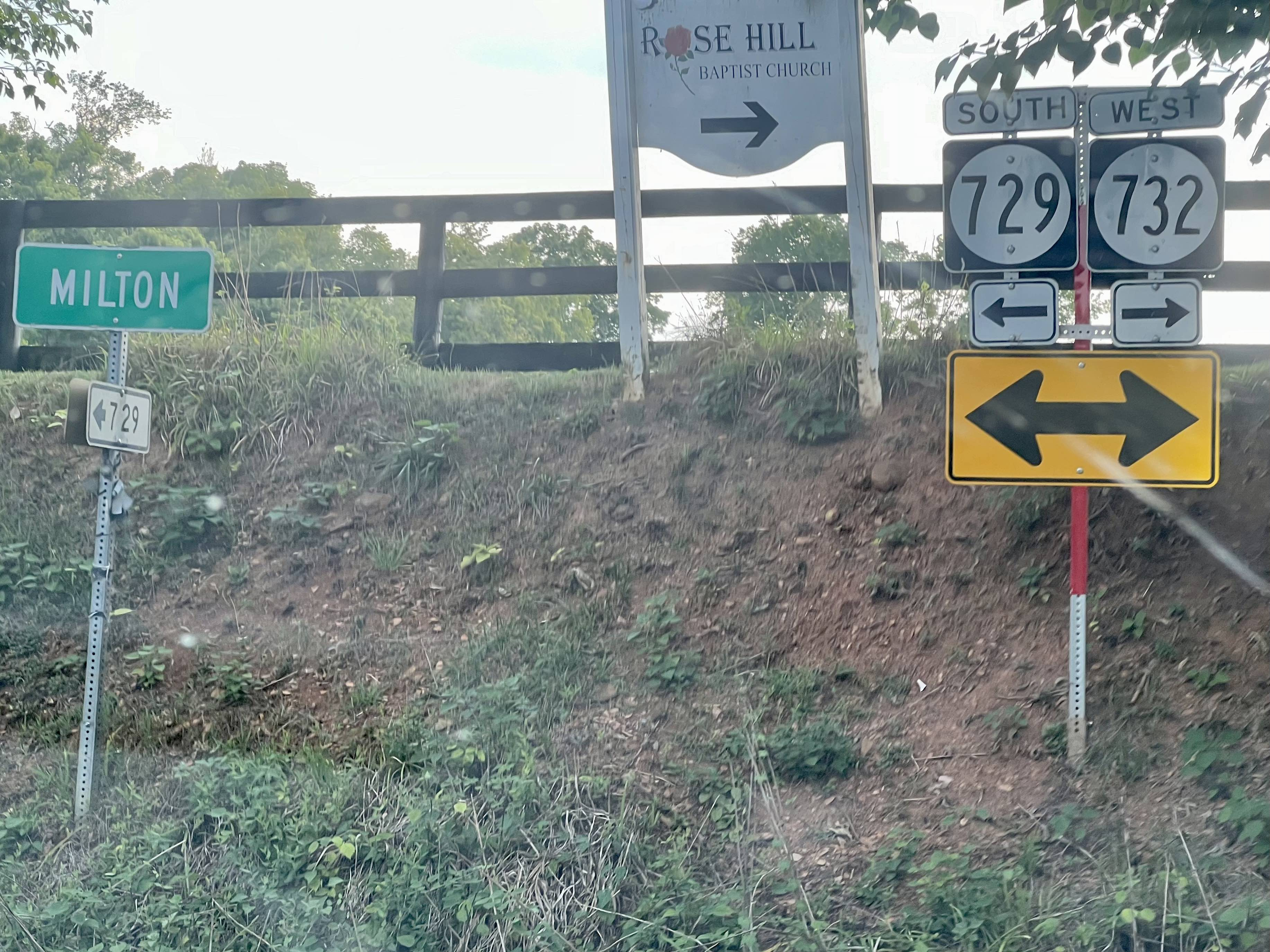
- Sign on a main road near Milton.

- Location within the Commonwealth of Virginia Milton (the United States)
- Coordinates: 38°00′19″N 78°24′09″W
- Country: United States
- State: Virginia
- County: Albemarle
- Time zone: UTC−5 (Eastern (EST))
  - Summer (DST): UTC−4 (EDT)
- GNIS feature ID: 1477543

Milton is an unincorporated community in Albemarle County, Virginia, United States. In the batteaux era Milton was the head of navigation along the river, but by the mid-nineteenth century horse-drawn canal boats were traveling all the way upstream to Charlottesville, where the head of navigation was located at the very point where the Fredericksburg Road (now VA 20) and Three Chopt Road (U.S. Route 250).

== Notable people ==
- Lizzie Petit Cutler (1831-1902), writer
