= Lincoln Temple United Church of Christ =

Historic church in Washington, D.C., United States

- Lincoln Industrial Mission- Lincoln Memorial Congregational Church
- U.S. National Register of Historic Places
- U.S. Historic district – Contributing property
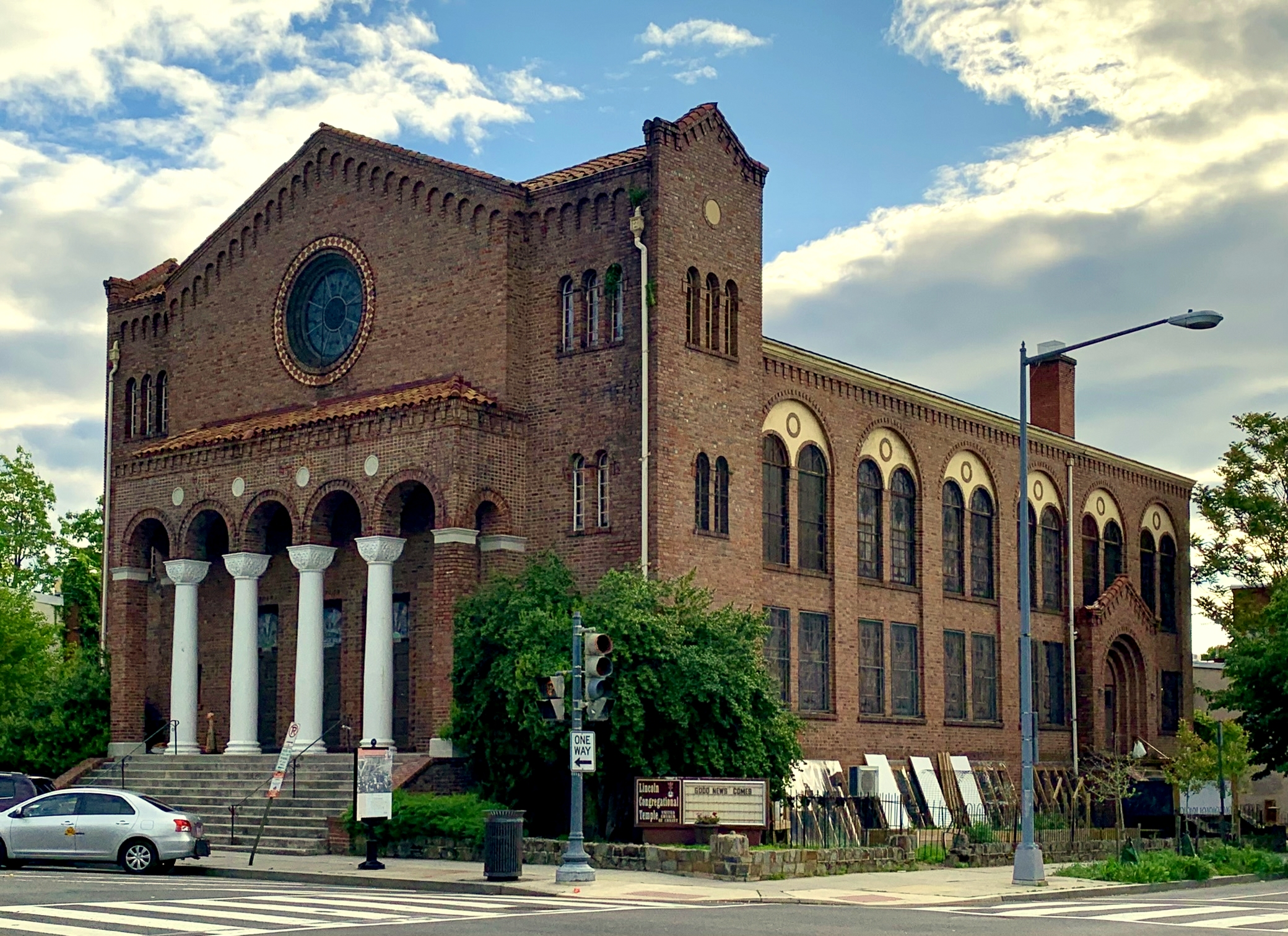
- Lincoln Temple United Church of Christ in 2023

- Location within Washington, D.C.
- Location: 1701 11th St., NW; Washington, D.C.
- Coordinates: 38°54′47″N 77°1′36″W
- Built: 1928
- Architect: Howard Wright Cutler
- Part of: Greater U Street Historic District (ID93001129)
- NRHP reference No.: 95000163
- Added to NRHP: February 24, 1995

Lincoln Temple United Church of Christ was a congregation of the United Church of Christ located since 1880 in the Shaw neighborhood in the Northwest Quadrant of Washington, D.C. The original congregation established as Lincoln Memorial Congregational Church. A church building was completed in 1928 and is a historic structure that was listed on the National Register of Historic Places in 1995. The church is also listed on the city's African-American Heritage Trail.

Due to changing demographics in the neighborhood, the church membership declined. It held its final service on September 30, 2018.

== History ==
The congregation can trace its roots to the Lincoln Industrial Mission, which was founded as an educational and social aid mission after the American Civil War. The mission was built on this site in 1868-1869.

In 1880 ten members of First Congregational Church established Lincoln Memorial Congregational Church at the mission. The congregation merged with Park Temple Congregational Church in 1901, and they took the present name.

The American Negro Academy (ANA), the first major African-American learned society in the United States, was formed by the Rev. Alexander Crummell and other intellectuals in 1897. It held its inaugural address in the church.

Walter B. Hayson, one of the founders of the ANA and a protege of Crummell, directed the choir. Notable 20th-century musicians such as Jessye Norman, Marian Anderson and Roberta Flack have sung at the church. Preachers and scholars such as Julian Bond and Jeremiah A. Wright, Jr. have spoken from its pulpit.

Many in the congregation were active during the civil rights era. The church allowed people attending the August 1963 March on Washington for Jobs and Freedom to camp out in the church's auditorium. The church distributed clothes and food to people in the neighborhood during the riots that followed the April 1968 assassination of Martin Luther King Jr. in Memphis. Its leaders had been active in the civil rights movement and working on social justice issues in the capital. For example, minister Channing Emery Phillips was also active in the Coalition of Conscience in D.C. He served as president of the Housing Development Corporation and supported full home-rule status for the District of Columbia.

Because of the church's long significance in the District of Columbia, it has been listed as a site on the city's African-American Heritage Trail.

=== Final years ===
The Washington Post cites retirement of its longtime pastor, the Rev. Benjamin E. Lewis, in 1994 as the beginning of the church's decline. This also coincided with demographic changes in the surrounding Shaw/Logan Circle neighborhoods, which went from 65 percent African-American population in 1990 to 29 percent in 2010.

The congregation attempted to appeal to the changed neighborhood, becoming an open and affirming church. It sponsored Saturday evening concerts with performances by the National Symphony and the Gay Men's Chorus, but concert-goers failed to return for Sunday services the next morning.

Revised regulations that extended on-street parking restrictions to Sundays were also cited for the decline in church attendance.

== Architecture ==
The present church building was designed by Howard Wright Cutler in the Italian Romanesque Revival style. It was completed in 1928. The building features a basilican plan with arched windows. The exterior has variegated brick and a gabled roof. The west façade of the church is dominated by a rose window and an arcaded portico. The portico features stone columns with foliate Byzantine capitals, corbelled frieze and a tile roof. It was listed on the National Register of Historic Places in 1995.
