= Eldbrooke United Methodist Church =

Historic church in Washington, D.C., United States

- U.S. National Register of Historic Places
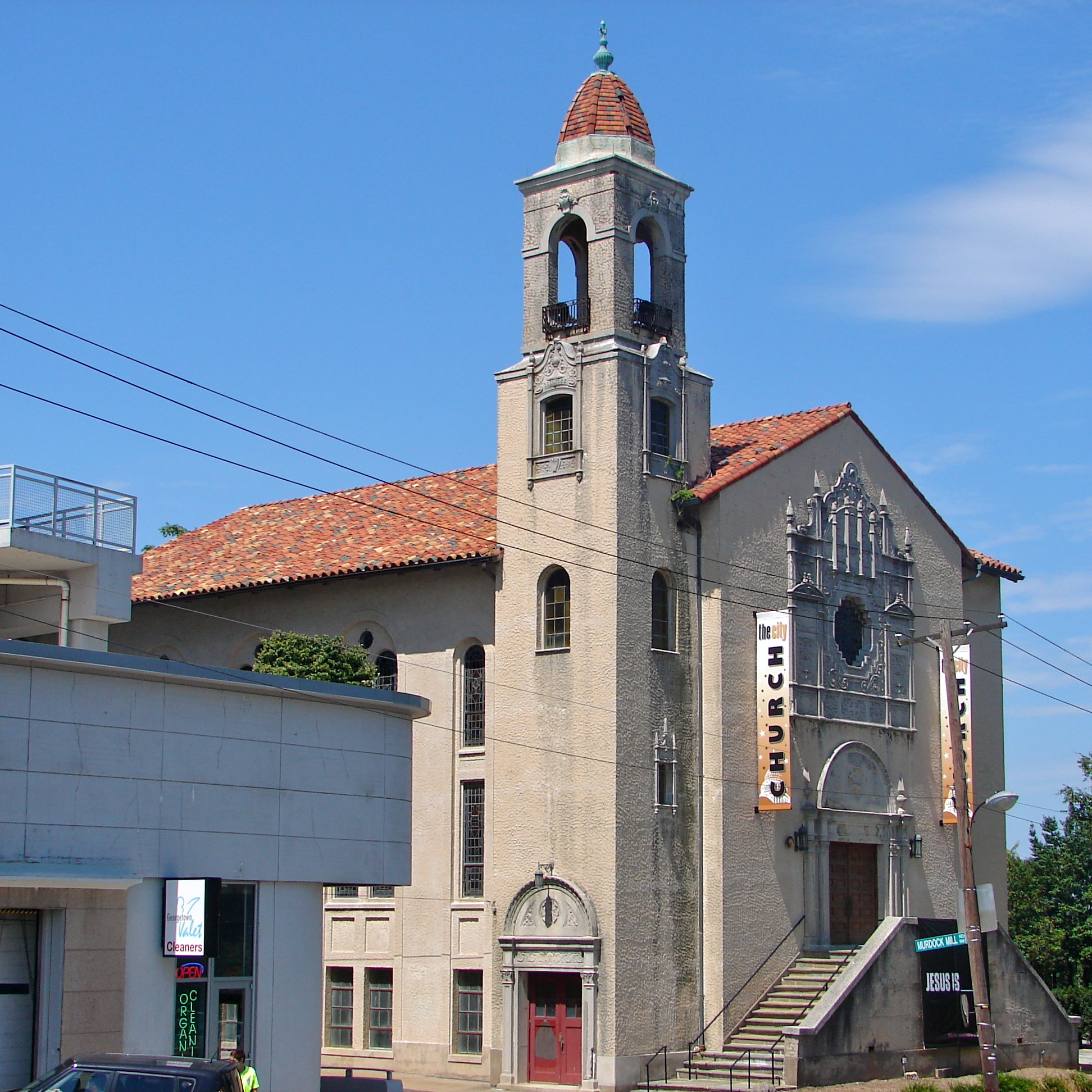

- Location within District of Columbia
- Location: 4100 River Road, N.W., Washington, D.C.
- Coordinates: 38.949038°N 77.081157°W
- Built: 1926
- Architect: Howard Wright Cutler
- Architectural style: Spanish Colonial Revival
- MPS: Tenleytown in Washington, D.C.: 1770–1941, MPS
- NRHP reference No.: 08000840
- Added to NRHP: September 05, 2008

Eldbrooke United Methodist Church is a historic church building located at 4100 River Road NW in the Tenleytown neighborhood Washington, D.C.

== History ==
The first church on this site, called Mount Zion Methodist, was established in 1840, in the vicinity of Tennally Town, a farming village, approximately three miles north of Georgetown, on the Rockville Pike. The original structure may have been rebuilt after the Civil War. In 1899, the building was renovated and expanded, and the name was changed to Eldbrooke, after Aquila Eld and Philip Brooke, who were among the founders.

The Spanish Colonial Revival building, designed by Howard Wright Cutler, was built in 1926. Descendants of the Eld family were still present in the 1960s. After church membership had declined thru the latter 1900s, responsibility for ministry was assigned to Metropolitan Memorial United Methodist Church in the 1990s, and ministry was discontinued in early 2000s. The property was purchased by The City Church in 2008.

It was added to the National Register of Historic Places and District of Columbia Inventory of Historic Sites in 2008.
