= Howard Wright Cutler =

American architect (1883–1948)

- Born: February 19, 1883; Ouray, Colorado, U.S.
- Died: December , 1948 (Age 65); Washington, D.C., U.S.
- Citizenship: United States
- Education: Rochester Athenium and Mechanics Institute
- Occupation: Architect
- Spouse: Marie Katherine (Zahn) Cutler
- Children: Katherine Cutler
- Buildings: Kodak Tower, Rochester, New York Lincoln Temple United Church of Christ, Washington, D.C. Eldbrooke United Methodist Church, Washington, D.C.

Howard Wright Cutler (1883–1948) was an American architect known primarily for his designs of churches, schools and public buildings in Washington, D.C., and adjacent Montgomery County, Maryland.

== Early life and education ==
Cutler was born in Ouray, Colorado, on February 19, 1883. He studied engineering and architecture at the Rochester Athenium and Mechanics Institute in Rochester, New York (today known as Rochester Institute of Technology), graduating with a Bachelor of Architecture.

Cutler married Marie Katherine Zahn. Their daughter, Katherine Cutler, was the first licensed female architect in the State of Maryland and collaborated with her father on a variety of projects.

== Career ==
Cutler worked at the firm of Gordon & Madden in Rochester until he established his own firm in 1907. During his Rochester years, he is credited with the design of the Kodak Tower, a 19-story skyscraper.

During World War I, Cutler served as a major for the Surgeon General's staff, in charge of designing military hospitals in the United States, including an addition to Walter Reed Hospital. His other buildings included the Otten Tuberculosis Hospital at Fort Bragg, North Carolina, and the General Hospital in Denver, Colorado.

After the war, he moved his family to Washington, D.C., where he established himself as the principal architect of Montgomery County's academic architecture from the mid-1920s to the mid-1940s. From 1919 to 1921, he was a partner in the firm of Cutler & Woodbridge, which later became Cutler and Moss, and later still his own solo practice. During this time, his architectural designs evolved from Art Deco to Classical Revival to Streamline Art Moderne.

The Cutler-designed Lincoln Temple United Church of Christ and Eldbrooke United Methodist Church in Washington, D.C., are listed on the National Register of Historic Places (NRHP), and several other buildings he designed have been designated as historic sites by the Maryland Historical Trust or other authorities.

Cutler continued the practice of architecture until his death in 1948.

== Partial list of works ==
The following is a partial list of buildings designed by Cutler during his career:

- Kodak Tower, Rochester, N.Y., 1912
- Takoma Park-Silver Spring High School (Silver Spring Intermediate School), 1925 (demolished)
- Eldbrooke United Methodist Church, Washington, D.C., 1926, NRHP-listed in 1995
- Masonic Temple and Library Association, Georgia Avenue & Wayne Avenue, Silver Spring, Maryland, 1927
- Silver Spring Intermediate School Auditorium, 1928
- Garrett Park School, Garrett Park, Maryland, 1927-8 *
- Lincoln Temple United Church of Christ, Washington, D.C., 1928, NRHP-listed in 2008
- Clara Barton School (now Clara Barton Community Center), Cabin John, Maryland, 1928 *
- Colesville Elementary School, Colesville, Maryland, 1929
- Chevy Chase Elementary School, Chevy Chase, Maryland, 1930, 1936 *
- Park Street Elementary School, Rockville, Maryland, 1934-5
- Damascus Elementary School, Damascus, Maryland, 1935
- Bethesda-Chevy Chase High School, Bethesda, Maryland, 1935
- (original) Montgomery Blair High School, Silver Spring, Maryland, 1935 (now housing Silver Spring International Middle School) *
- Montgomery Hills Junior High School, Silver Spring, 1936–7
- Westbrook Elementary School, Bethesda, Maryland, 1939
- Washington Suburban Sanitary Commission Headquarters, Hyattsville, Maryland, 1939 *
- Rock Creek Community Center, Chevy Chase, Maryland, c. 1940 (with Katherine Cutler) *
- Lynnbrook Elementary School (East Bethesda), 1941 (with Katherine Cutler)
- Church of the Ascension, Silver Spring, Maryland
- St. Andrew's Episcopal Church, College Park, Maryland

(Properties marked with * have been designated as historical properties by the Maryland Historical Trust).

== Gallery ==
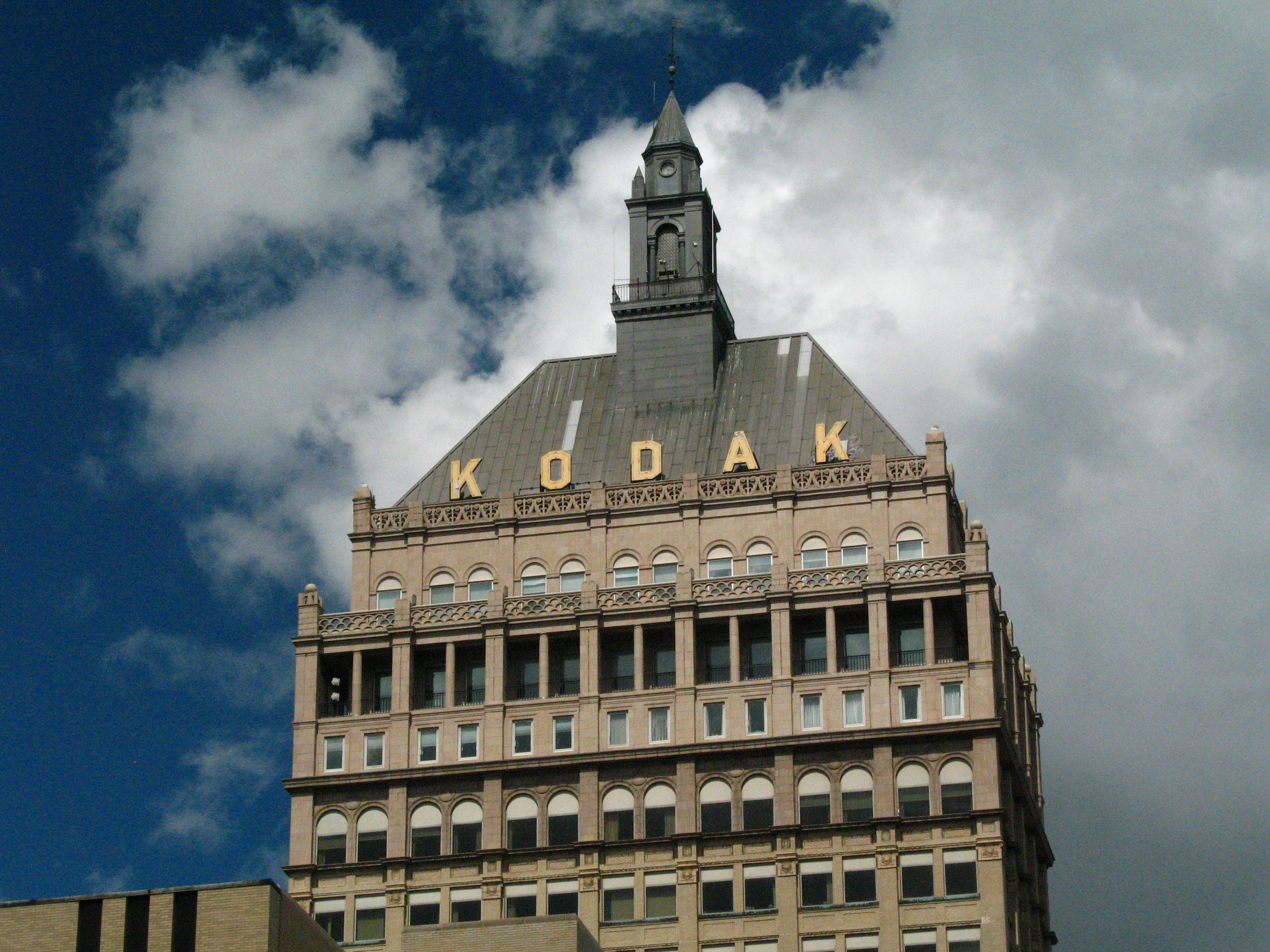
Kodak Tower, Rochester, N.Y. (1912)

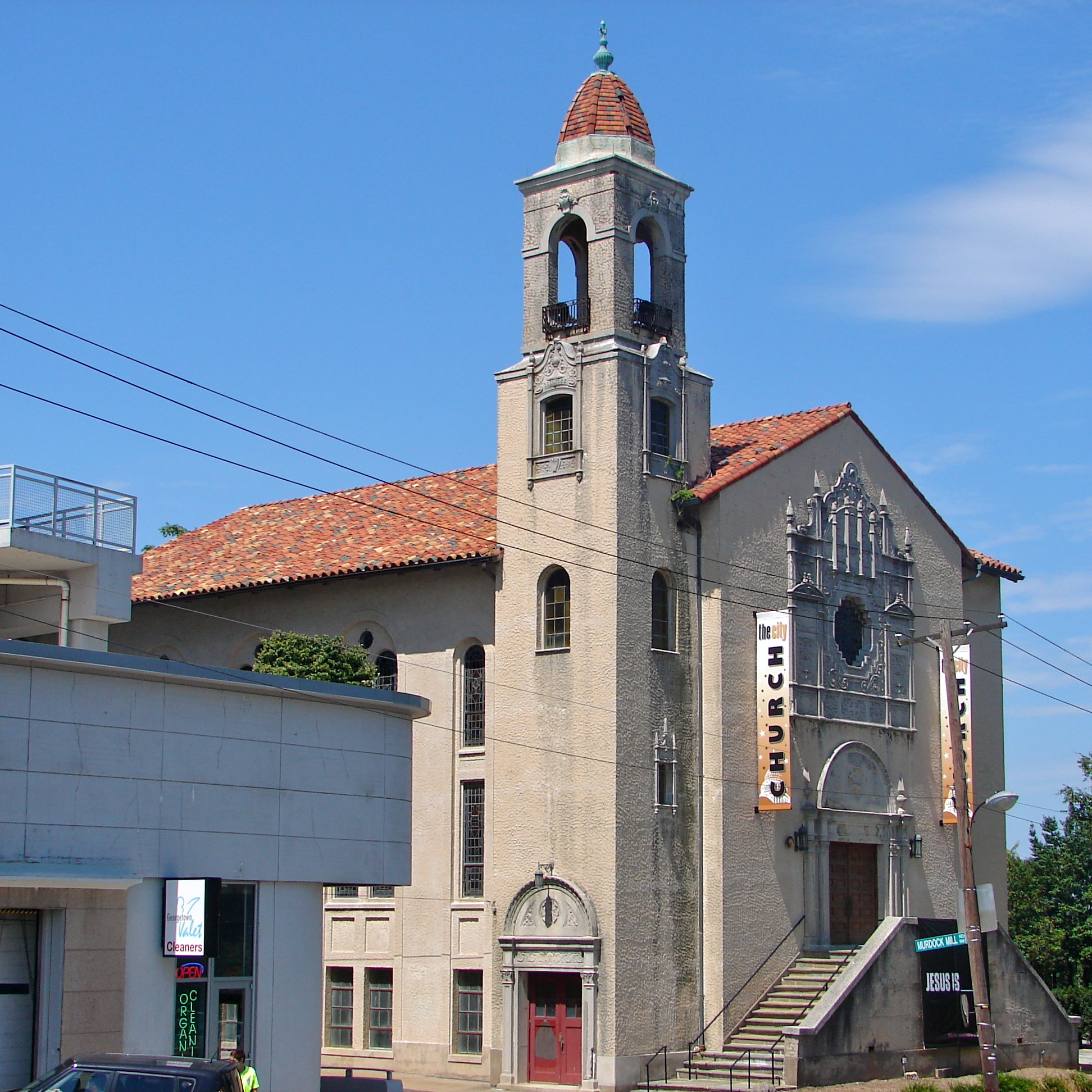
Eldbrooke United Methodist Church, Washington, D.C. (1926)

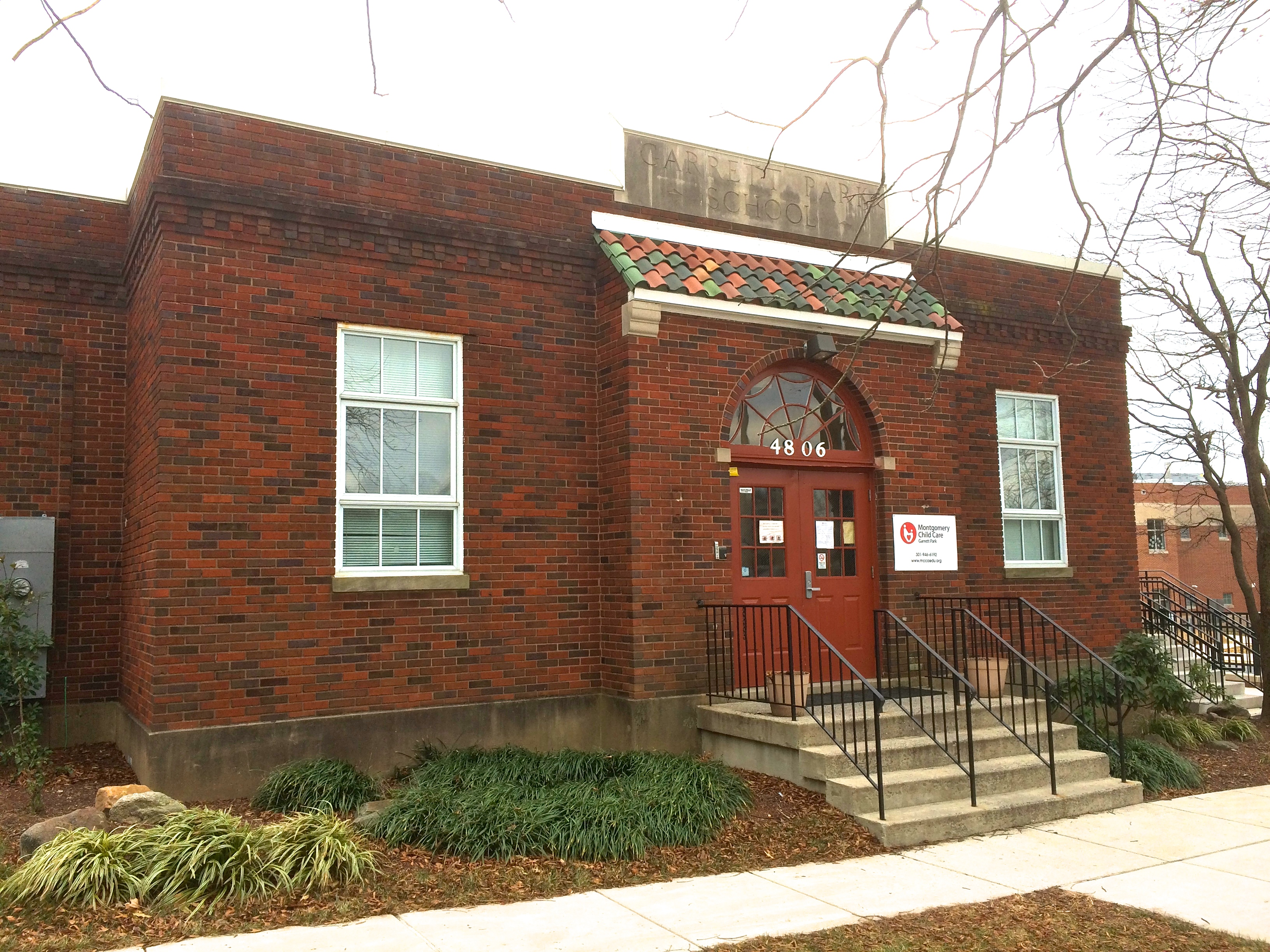
Garrett Park School, Garrett Park, Maryland (1927–28)

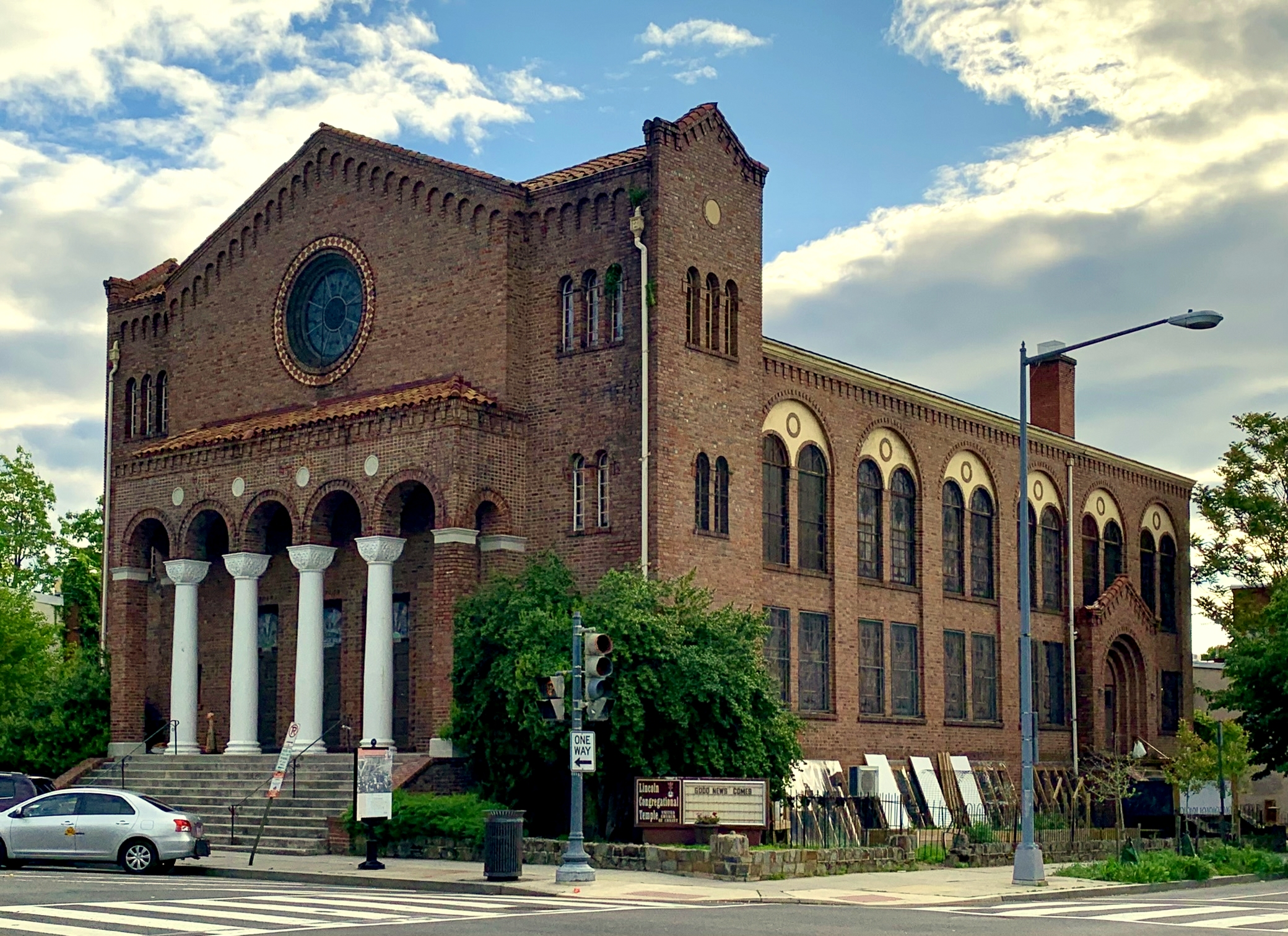
Lincoln Temple United Church of Christ, Washington, D.C. (1928)

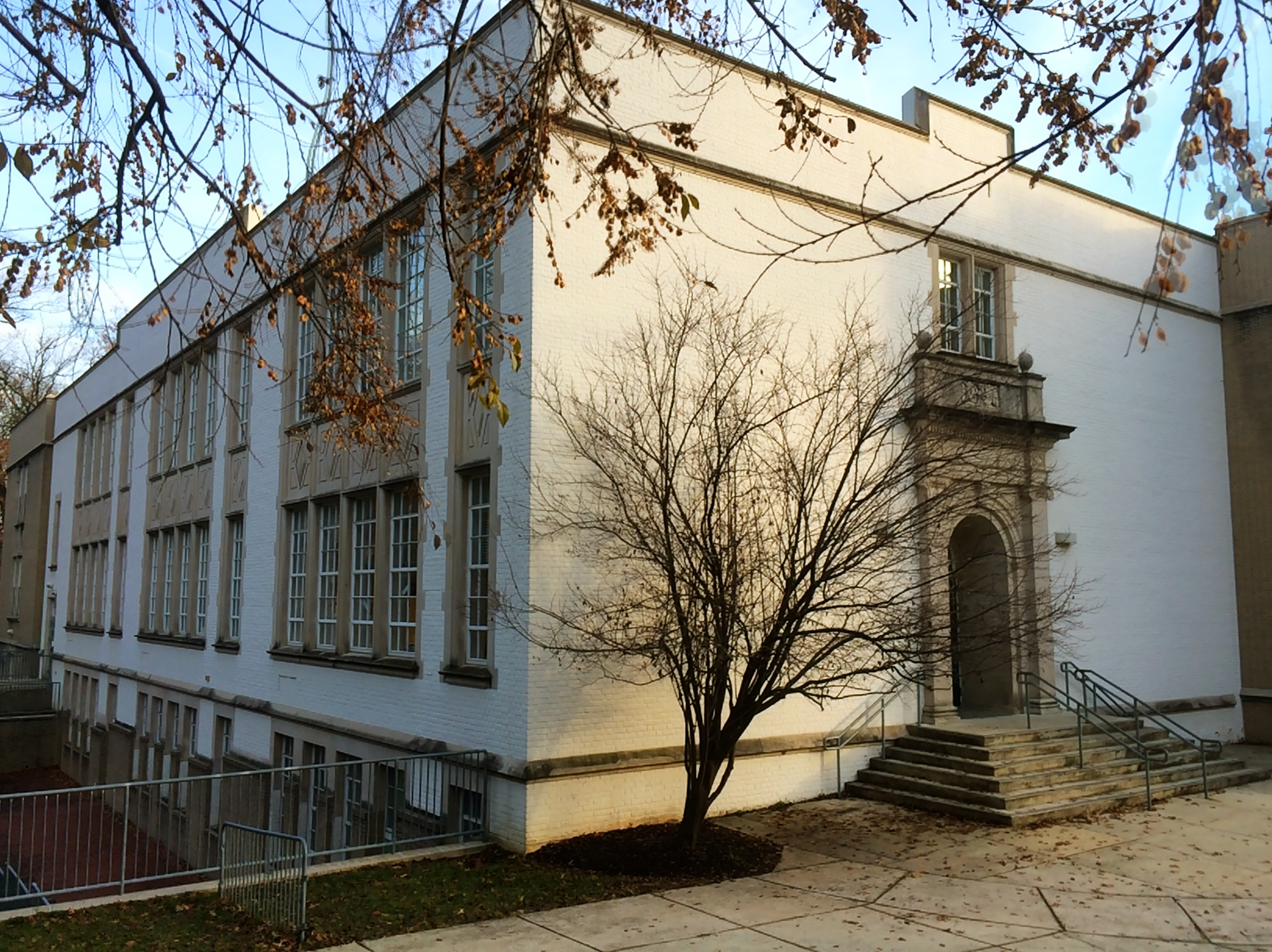
Chevy Chase Elementary School, west wing, Chevy Chase, Maryland (1936)

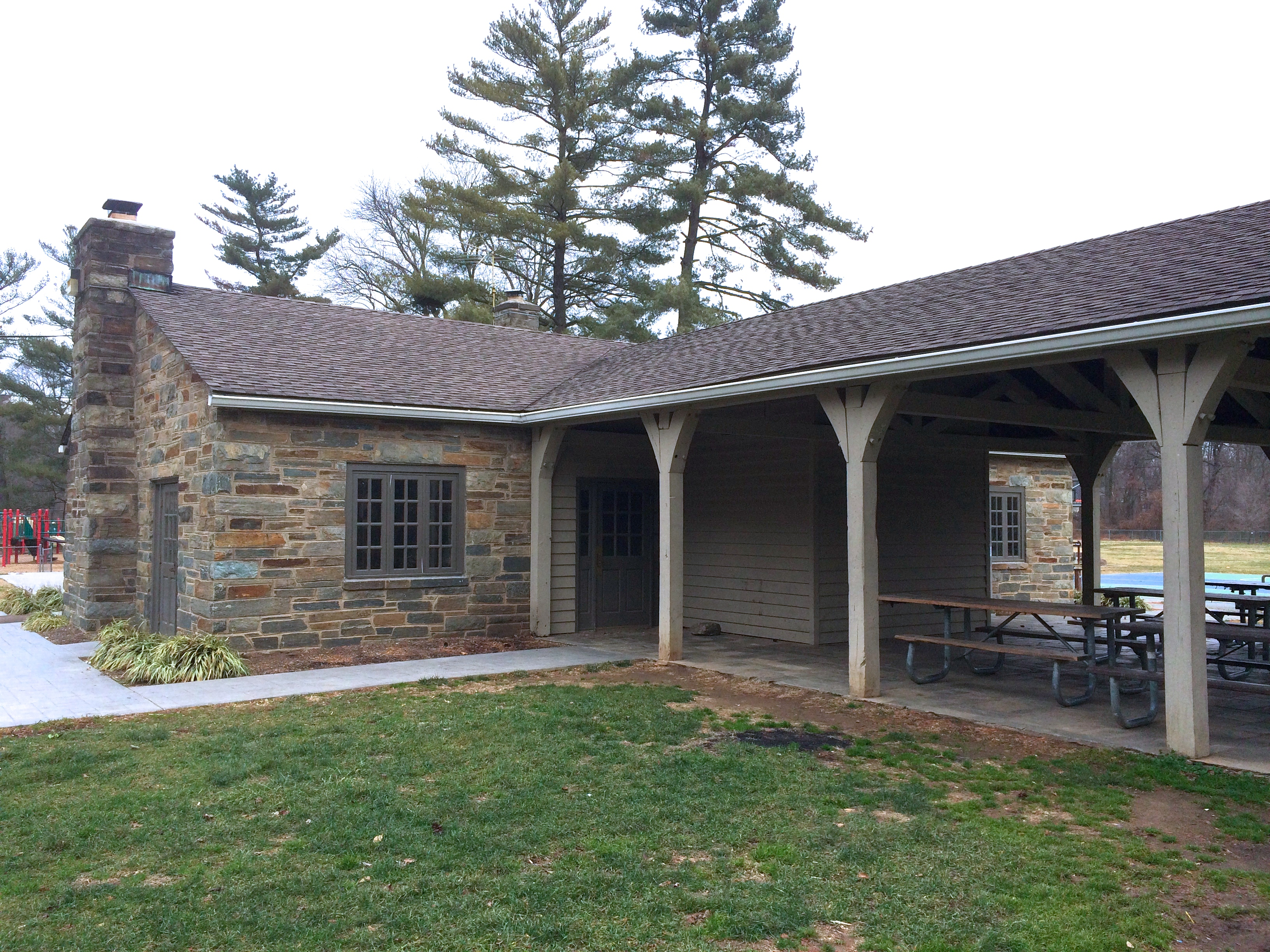
Rock Creek Community Center (now Rock Creek or Meadowbrook Park Activity Building), Chevy Chase, Maryland (c. 1940)
