= Leonard Cutler =

American scientist (1928–2006)

Leonard Cutler (1928–2006), also known as Leonard S. Cutler, was a pioneer and authority on ultra-precise timekeeping devices and standards, and was well known for his work with quantum-mechanical effects. He was the co-inventor of the HP5060A Cesium Beam Clock, its successor the HP 5071A, and the two-frequency laser inferometer. He has also been praised for his crucial contributions to the design of the Allen Telescope Array.

== Life ==
Leonard Cutler was born in Los Angeles in 1928. He attended Stanford University, but after two years returned home to help his family out of financial troubles. While away from academia he served in the U.S. Navy and married his wife, Dorothy. Shortly after getting married, he and his wife started their family of four sons, Jeff, Greg, Steve and Scott. During which time he also returned to Stanford University where he earned a BS in 1958, a MS in 1960, and a PhD in 1966. On September 5, 2006, at the age of 78, he died of heart failure while camping with his wife in Big Basin Redwoods State Park in California, USA. Len participated in Bay Area car rallies in the late 1970’s. Driving his Porsche 911 with his son (which one?) as navigator, he frequently finished in first place.

== Career ==
Cutler worked at Hewlett-Packard Laboratories (1957–1999), where he developed oscillators, atomic frequency standards and designed atomic chronometers. In 1999, he went on to work at Agilent Technologies, a spin-off from H-P, where he developed quartz oscillators, atomic clocks, and used the Global Positioning System to synchronize clocks worldwide. Towards the end of his time there, he concentrated on designs related to the chip scale atomic clock.

In 1964, Leonard Cutler and his colleague Al Bagley invented the first all-solid-state cesium-beam chronometer known as the HP5060A Cesium Beam Clock. The clock measured international time within a microsecond and increased the accuracy of time tracking from a millisecond held by its predecessors. Shortly after the clock's invention, its frequency standard was adopted by the US National Institute of Standards and technology and scientific centers around the world.

In 1967, his cesium "flying clock" was used in flights around the world to bring timekeeping accuracy down to about 0.1 microseconds. In 1972 and 1976, these same clocks were used in flight tests verifying Albert Einstein's theories of special and general relativity, showing that time does slow down the faster you move or the closer you are to a source of gravity, such as the Earth.

In 1991, Cutler invented the HP 5071A, which is twice as accurate as its 1964 counterpart. Losing only a second of accuracy every 1.6 million years, it remains the most accurate commercial clock in the world, and accounts for 82% of the data used to keep the International Atomic Time Standard (as of 2006). The 5071A is now manufactured by Microchip in Beverly MA, along with the newer, higher performance model, the 5071B.

== Additional inventions ==
Leonard and his colleagues invented and held patents for quartz oscillators and the two-frequency laser interferometer, which is used in fiber optics, integrated circuit manufacturing, physics and many other scientific fields of study today.

== Awards and honors ==
Known worldwide as an authority on atomic timekeeping and quantum-mechanical effects, Cutler received many awards and honors throughout his career.

2004 – Named Agilent Technologies’ first Distinguished Fellow
2000 – Named Inventor of the Week by the Massachusetts Institute of Technology as part of the Lemelson-MIT National Program in Invention, Innovation and Creativity
2000 – IEEE Third Millennium Medal
1999 – Distinguished PTTI Service Award for outstanding contributions related to the management of PTTI (Precise Time and Time Interval) systems.
1997 – Front-page profile written about him in The Wall Street Journal (March 19, 1997)
1996 – Elected a Fellow of the American Physical Society
1993 – American Institute of Physics Prize for Industrial Application of Physics
1990 – Named H-P’s first Distinguished Contributor
1989 – Rabi Award from the IEEE Ultrasonics, Ferroelectrics, and Frequency Control Society, for "consistent technical and managerial contributions to the development of atomic cesium, rubidium and mercury ion frequency standards."
1987 – Elected to the National Academy of Engineering
1984 – IEEE Morris E. Leeds Award for outstanding contributions to the development of advanced time standards
1984 – IEEE’s Centennial Award
1978 – Elected an IEEE Fellow for contributions to the design of atomic frequency standards and to the theory and measurement of frequency stability
1974 – Served on the Technical Program Committee of the IEEE Frequency Control Symposium for 32 years, until his death in 2006.

== Patents ==
October 21, 2008 – Patent No. 7440113 - Littrow interferometer

March 18, 2008 - Patent No. 7345553 - Method and apparatus for reducing errors due to line asymmetry in devices utilizing coherent population trapping

April 10, 2007 - Patent No. 7202751 - Optically pumped frequency standard with reduces AC stark shift

March 26, 2002 - Patent No. 6363091 - Coherent population trapping-based method for generating a frequency standard having a reduced magnitude of total a.c. stark shift

March 19, 2002 - Patent No. 6359917 - Detection method and detector for generating a detection signal that quantifies a resonant interaction between a quantum absorber and incident electro-magnetic radiation

March 13, 2001 - Patent No. 6201821 - Coherent population trapping-based frequency standard having a reduced magnitude of total a.c. stark shift

March 17, 1998 - Patent No. 5729181 - High thermal gain oven with reduced probability of temperature gradient formation for the operation of a thermally stable oscillator

October 15, 1996 - Patent No. 5566180 - Method for recognizing events and synchronizing clocks

September 8, 1992 - Patent No. 5146184 - Atomic clock system with improved servo system

November 15, 1988 - Patent No. 4784489 - Fiber-optic based remote receiver for laser interferometer systems

January 10, 1984 - Patent No. 4425653 - Atomic beam device using optical pumping

April 27, 1976 - Patent No. 3953840 - Magneto resistive bubble detection device

August 26, 1975 - Patent No. 3901468 - Logic backup for a train detection system in an automatic block system

July 3, 1973 - Patent No. 3744042 – Memory Protect for Magnetic Bubble Memory

May 15, 1973 - Patent No. 3733511 – Molecular Beam Tube Having Means for Degaussing the Magnetic Shielding Structure

January 30, 1973 - Patent No. 3714607 – Acousto-Optic Method and Apparatus for Mode Decoupling a Ring

July 4, 1972 - Patent No. 3675149 – Atomic Beam Tube Having Multiple Beams

May 30, 1972 - Patent No. 3667038 – Acousto-Optic RF Spectrum Analysis Method and Apparatus

April 18, 1972 - Patent No. 3656853 – Interferometric System

== Writings ==
References

- Cutler, Leonard S. "Fifty years of commercial caesium clocks." Metrologia. 42.3 (2005): S90. Print.
- Zhu, M., L.S. Cutler, J.E. Berberian, J.F. DeNatale, P.A. Stupar, and C. Tsai. "Narrow linewidth CPT signal in small vapor cells for chip scale atomic clocks." Frequency Control Symposium and Exposition, 2004. Proceedings of the 2004 IEEE International. 2004. 100-103. Print.
- Cutler, Leonard S. "Passive Atomic Frequency Standards: A Tutorial." 2002 IEEE International Frequency Control Symposium Tutorials. New Orleans, 2002. Print.
- Cutler, L.S., J.A. Kusters, and E.D. Powers. "Long-term experience with cesium beam frequency standards." Frequency and Time Forum, 1999 and the IEEE International Frequency Control Symposium, 1999., Proceedings of the 1999 Joint Meeting of the European.1999. 159-163. Print. doi:10.1109/FREQ.1999.840733
- Cutler, Leonard S. " Thermalization of .sup.199 Hg Ion Macromotion by a Light Background Gas in an RF Quadrupole Trap." Appl. Phys. B36. 1985. 137-142. Print.
- Cutler, L.S., R.P. Giffard, and M.D. McGuire. "Mercury-199 Trapped Ion Frequency Standard: Recent Theoretical Progress and Experimental Results." 37th Annual Symposium on Frequency Control. 1983. 1983. 32-36. Print. doi:10.1109/FREQ.1983.200641
- Cutler, Leonard S. "A Trapped Mercury 199 Ion Frequency Standard." Proc. of 13th Annual Precise Time and Time Interval (PTTI) Applications & Planning Meeting. NASA Conf. Pub. 2220. 1981. 563-577. Print.
- Joly, R., E.C. Hannah, J.E. Opfer, and L.S. Cutler. "Computer simulation of a voltage cell using a Josephson junction." IEEE Journal of Solid-State Circuits. 14.4 (1979): 685-689. Print. doi:10.1109/JSSC.1979.1051245
- Hyatt, R., D. Throne, L.S. Cutler, J.H. Holloway, and L.F. Mueller. "Performance of Newly Developed Cesium Beam Tubes and Standards." 25th Annual Symposium on Frequency Control. 1971. 1971. 313-324. Print. doi:10.1109/FREQ.1971.199872
- Cutler, L.S. "Present Status in Short Term Frequency Stability ." 21st Annual Symposium on Frequency Control. 1967. 1967. 259-263. Print. doi:10.1109/FREQ.1967.199670
- Cutler, L.S. "Some aspects of the theory and measurement of frequency fluctuations in frequency standards." Proceedings of the IEEE (0018-9219). 1966. 136. Print. doi:10.1109/PROC.1966.4627
- Peters, H.E., J. Holloway, A.S. Bagley, and L.S. Cutler. "HYDROGEN MASER AND CESIUM BEAM TUBE FREQUENCY STANDARDS COMPARISON." Applied Physics Letters. 6.2 (1965): 34-35. Print. doi:10.1063/1.1728235
- Cutler, L.S., and A.S. Bagley. "A Modern Solid-State Portable Cesium Beam Frequency Standard." 18th Annual Symposium on Frequency Control. 1964. 1964. 344 - 365. Print. doi:10.1109/FREQ.1964.199548
- Cutler, Leonard S., and Alan S. Bagley. "A New Performance of the "Flying Clock" Experiment." HP Journal. 15.11 (Jul-1964): Print.
- Cutler, Leonard S. "New Series of Microwave Sweep Oscillators with Flexible Modulation and Leveling, by Robert L. Dudley Examination of the Atomic Spectral Lines of a Cesium Beam Tube with the -hp- Frequency Synthesizer." HP Journal. 15.4 (Dec-1963): 8. Print.
- Cutler, Leonard S. "A New Frequency/Time Standard with 5 x 10-10 Day Stability." HP Journal. 12.3 (Nov/Dec-1958): Print.
- Cutler, Leonard S., and LaThare N. Bodily. "5x10-8/Week Time Base Accuracy in the 10 MC Frequency Counter." HP Journal. 10.3-4 (Nov/Dec-1958): 5. Print.
