= Katherine Cutler Ficken =

American architect

- Born: Katherine Cutler; March 3, 1911; Rochester, New York
- Died: October 14, 1968 (aged 57); Bethesda, Maryland
- Education: George Washington University
- Occupation: Architect
- Spouse: Rudolph William Ficken

Katherine Cutler Ficken (1911–1968) was an American architect who was the first woman to be licensed as an architect in Maryland.

== Early life and education ==
Katherine Cutler was born March 3, 1911, to Howard Wright Cutler and Marie Katherine (Zahn) Cutler in Rochester, New York. Her father was an architect who designed military hospitals during World War I and later specialized in schools and government buildings. After the war, when Katherine was eight, her family moved to Washington, D.C., and then to Silver Spring, Maryland.

In 1934, Ficken graduated with a B.A. in architecture from George Washington University. During her college summers, she worked part-time as a draftsperson for her father's practice and also for the federal government.

== Career ==
Ficken established her own practice in 1934, but continued to work as an associate in her father's firm for several years. Projects on which she assisted her father included about a dozen high schools and elementary schools in Montgomery County and elsewhere, and several University of Maryland (UMD) buildings. One of their joint projects, the Rock Creek Field House (a wood and stone rest station in Rock Creek Stream Valley Park), was nominated in 2013 for inclusion in Montgomery County's Master Plan for Historic Preservation.

She obtained her architect's license in Maryland in 1936, and two years later was still the only woman licensed in the state.

One of Ficken's first major projects was a farming estate for a wealthy Maryland woman, Clara Hyatt, that she began work on in 1940. For Hyatt she designed not only a brick main house (now known as "Redwall") and farm outbuildings but also a watering system for the fields. The overall design program was predicated on the idea that the farm could be run by one woman alone during the war, when the draft drew away many male farmhands. A slightly later project was an award-winning restaurant reconstruction whose success helped her to secure a large postwar commission from UMD.

In 1947, she married Rudolph William Ficken, thereafter using Katherine Cutler Ficken as her professional name. In 1956, they adopted a son, Rudolph Ficken, Jr.

Ficken became a member of the American Institute of Architects (AIA) in 1950. She died of cancer in Bethesda, Maryland, on October 14, 1968.

== Legacy ==
Ficken was one of 12 architects featured in "Early Women of Architecture in Maryland," a traveling exhibition organized by the AIA that opened in June 2015.

== Partial list of buildings ==
=== With Howard Wright Cutler ===
- Rock Creek Field House (1940; now Meadowbrook Recreation Building)
- Lynbrook Elementary School, Bethesda (1941)
- UMD Dairy Building Addition & Renovation (1948)

=== Solo projects ===
- UMD, Edna Amos Nice Hall, Solomons Island (ca. 1938)
- Clara Hyatt estate, Germantown (1940–1945)
- American Instrument Company additions, Silver Spring (1942–43)
- Solomons Island Yacht Club (1944)
- Ceres Restaurant reconstruction (1945)
- UMD dining hall addition and greenhouses, College Park (1945–1948)
