= Colter Butte =

Landform in the Grand Canyon, Arizona

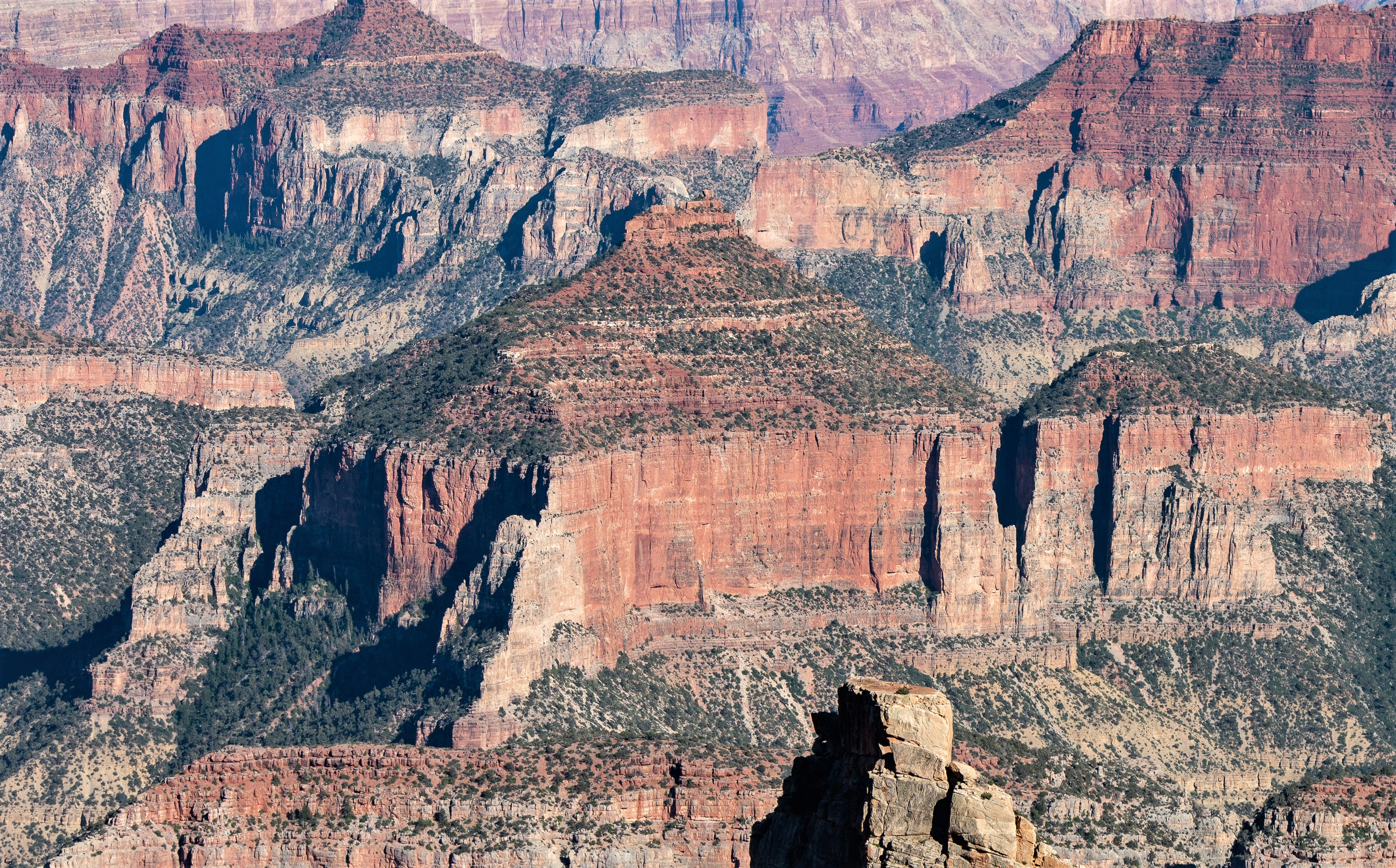
- Colter Butte centered. Northwest aspect as seen from Point Imperial. (summit spire of Mount Hayden in foreground)

Highest point
- Elevation: 7,254 ft (2,211 m)
- Prominence: 994 ft (303 m)
- Parent peak: Alsap Butte (7,500 ft)
- Isolation: 1.94 mi (3.12 km)
- Coordinates: 36°14′12″N 111°55′09″W

Geography
- Location within Arizona Location within the United States
- Country: United States
- State: Arizona
- County: Coconino
- Protected area: Grand Canyon National Park
- Parent range: Kaibab Plateau; Colorado Plateau
- Topo map: USGS Walhalla Plateau

Geology
- Rock type(s): sandstone, limestone, shale

Colter Butte is a 7,254-foot-elevation (2,211-meter) summit located in the Grand Canyon in Coconino County of northern Arizona, US. It is situated four miles southeast of Point Imperial, where it towers 3,600 feet (1,100 meters) above Nankoweap Canyon. Its neighbors include Brady Peak, 2.5 miles to the west-northwest, Alsap Butte two miles to the northwest, and Swilling Butte one-half mile to the east. Colter Butte is named after James G. H. Colter (1844–1922), born in Nova Scotia, Canada, he came to the Arizona Territory in 1872 as a pioneer, farmer, cattleman, Apache and desperado fighter. He was the father of Arizona state senator Fred Colter. This geographical feature's name was officially adopted in 1932 by the United States Board on Geographic Names. According to the Köppen climate classification system, Colter Butte is located in a cold semi-arid climate zone. This butte is composed of Pennsylvanian-Permian Supai Group which overlays cliff-forming Mississippian Redwall Limestone, which in turn overlays slope-forming Cambrian Tonto Group. Precipitation runoff from this feature drains east to the Colorado River via Nankoweap Creek on the north side and Kwagunt Creek from the south slope.

== See also ==
- Geology of the Grand Canyon area

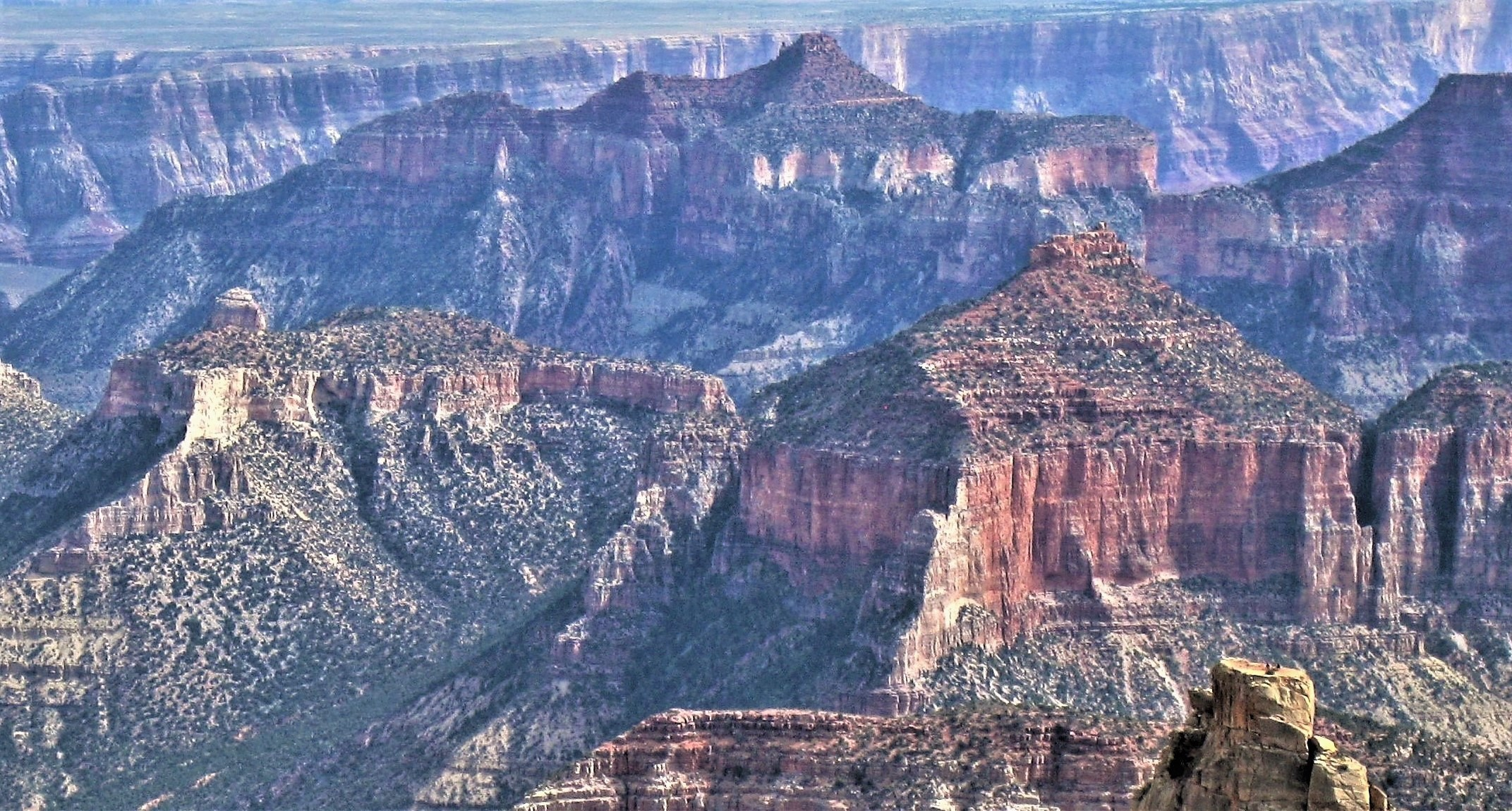
Swilling Butte (left), Gunther Castle (top), Colter Butte (right)
