= Trent Cutler =

Australian rugby league footballer

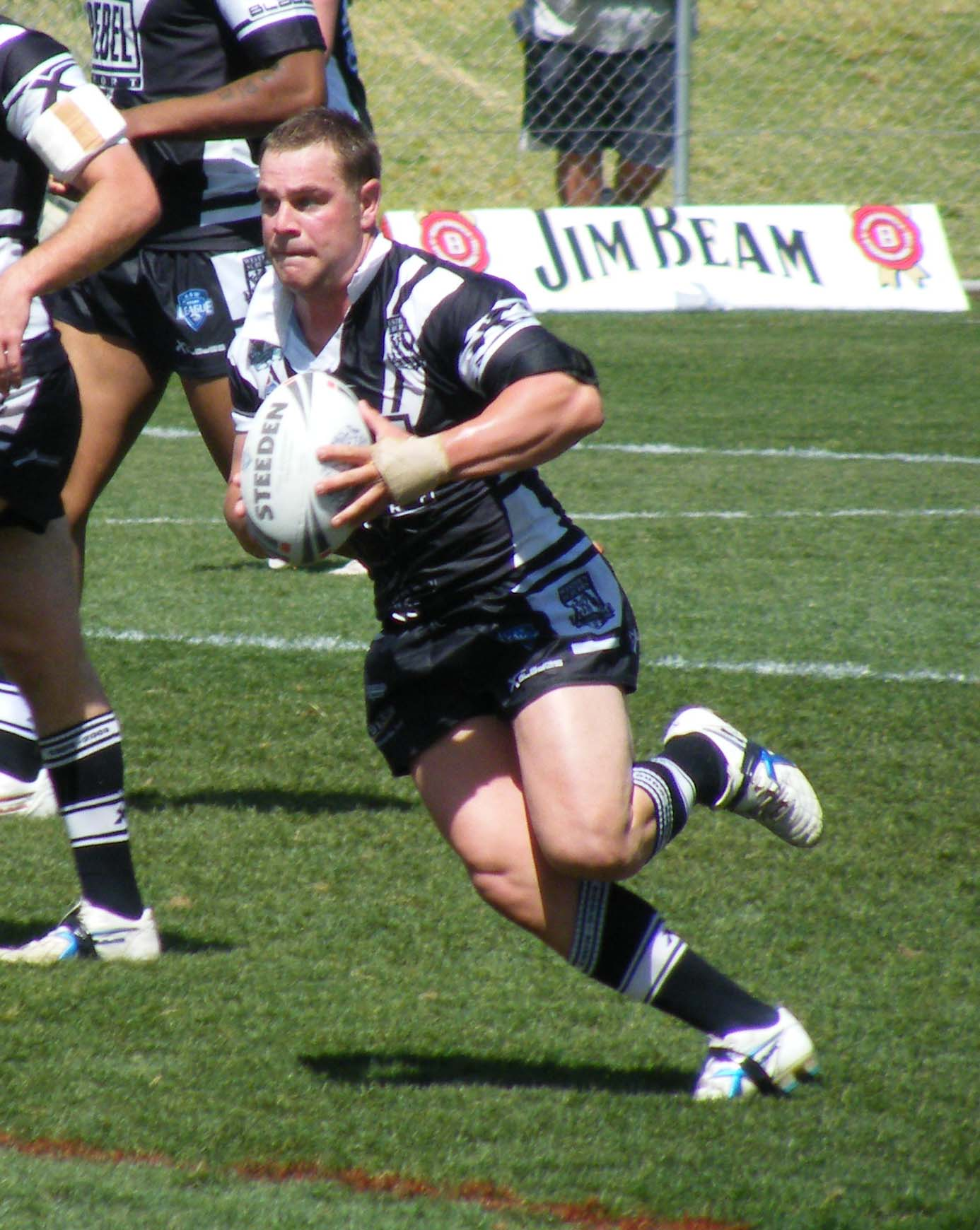

Personal information
- Full name: Trent Andrew Cutler
- Born: 19 January 1984 (age 42) Bankstown, New South Wales, Australia

Playing information
- Height: 174 cm (5 ft 9 in)
- Weight: 83 kg (13 st 1 lb)
- Position: Fullback, Wing
Club
Years	Team	Pld	T	G	FG	P
2005–11	Canterbury Bulldogs	25	10	0	0	40
- Father: Stan Cutler

Trent Andrew Cutler is an Australian former professional rugby league footballer. Cutler played for Canterbury-Bankstown in the National Rugby League (NRL) competition on the wing.

== Background ==
Cutler was born in Bankstown, New South Wales. He is the son of the former Canterbury player, Stan Cutler.

== Playing career ==
As 2004 NRL premiers, Canterbury-Bankstown faced Super League IX champions, Leeds in the 2005 World Club Challenge. Cutler played on the wing in Canterbury's 32–39 loss. He made his NRL debut against the Cronulla-Sutherland Sharks in round 4 of the 2005 NRL season.

After three years with Canterbury, Cutler moved to Western Suburbs for the 2008 season. In 2009, he has returned to the Canterbury's NSW Cup feeder club, the Bankstown City Bulls.
