= Tambour desk =

Type of desk

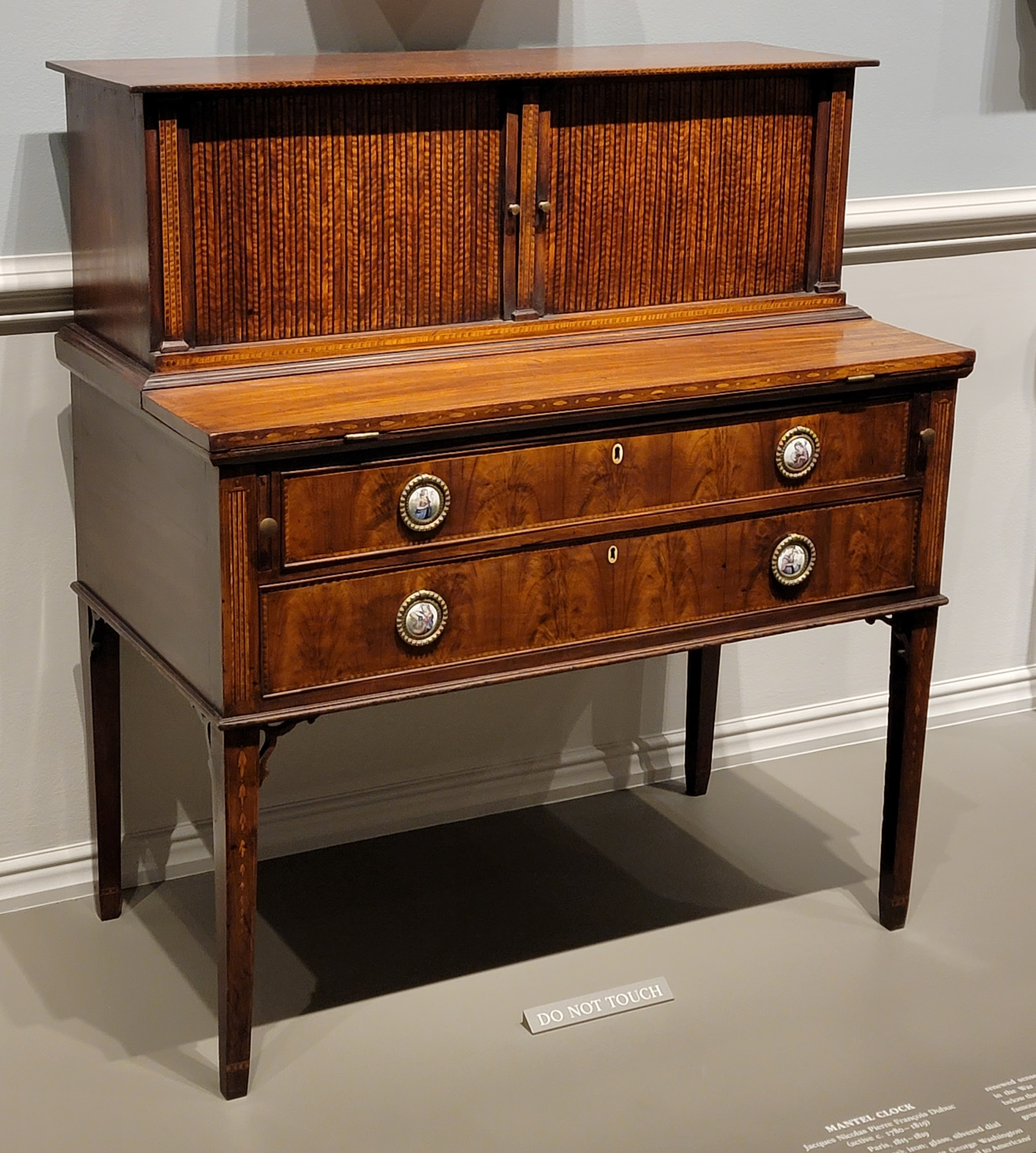
Tambour desk (Boston, 1793-1798) by John Seymour and Thomas Seymour with the tabletop folded up, handles of supporting sliders visible on the sides of the top drawer

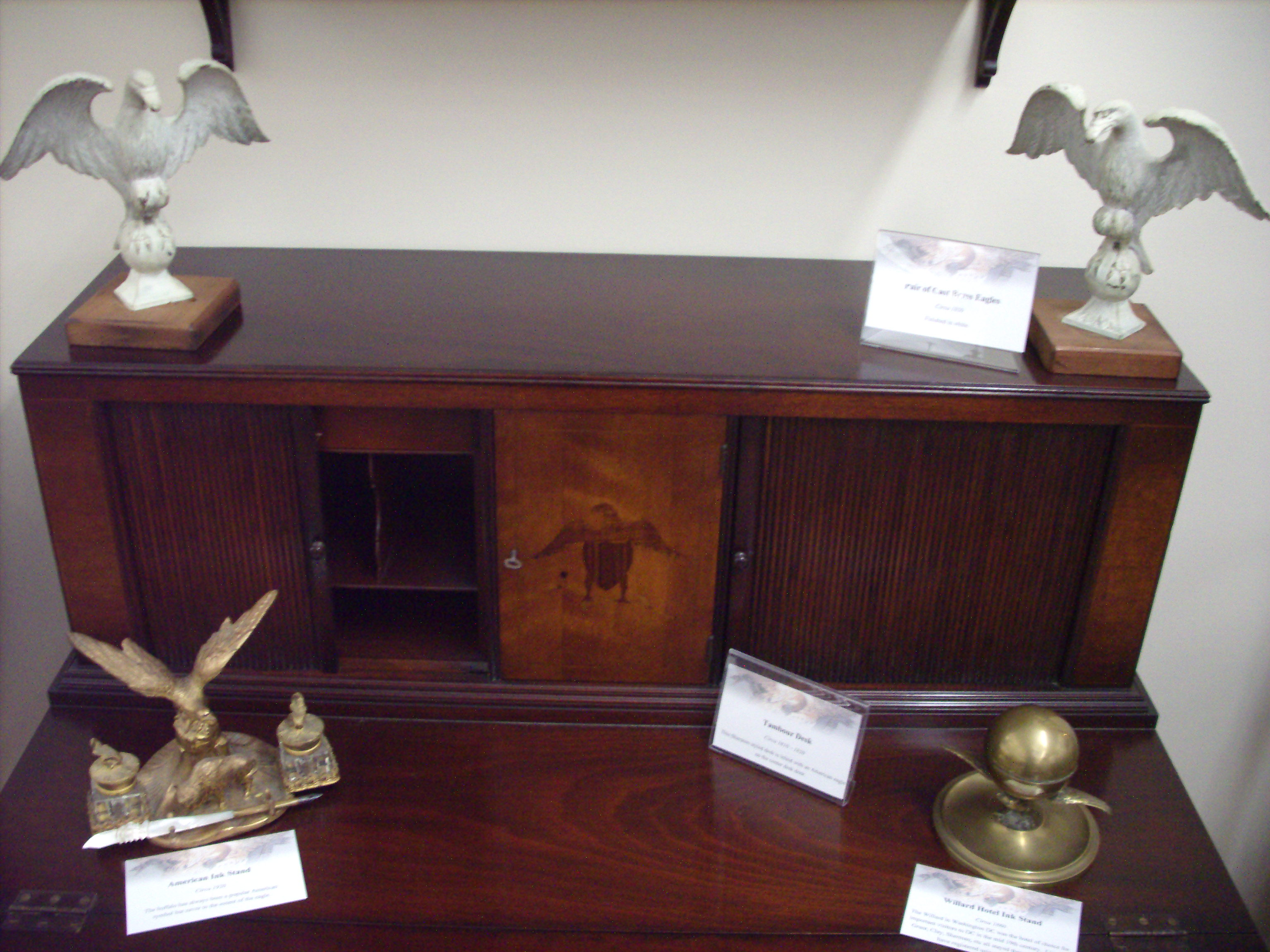
Pigeonholes behind the left shutters

A tambour desk is a desk with desktop-based drawers and pigeonholes, in a way resembling bureau à gradin. The small drawers and nooks are covered, when required, by reeded or slatted shutters, tambours, which usually retract in the two sides, left and right. It is a flatter and "sideways" version of the rolltop desk.

Unlike the rolltop desk, the tambour desk uses straight, perfectly vertical rows of shutters, and the work surface rests on a few drawers, which in turn are supported by short legs instead of pedestals. In addition, half of the desktop folds back on itself when not in use. The desktop is supported by sliders, like a secretary desk or a slant top desk when it is unfolded.

"Tambour" can also refer to the cover made of strips of wood of a roll-top desk is called a tambour. This has been adopted to describe an office cupboard that is designed to have doors that conceal within the cabinet when opened, also known as roller-shutters.

The tambour desk is an antique form indigenous to the United States of America and should not be confused with the British tambour writing table.

== See also ==
- List of desk forms and types
