= Coulter Flats =

- U.S. National Register of Historic Places
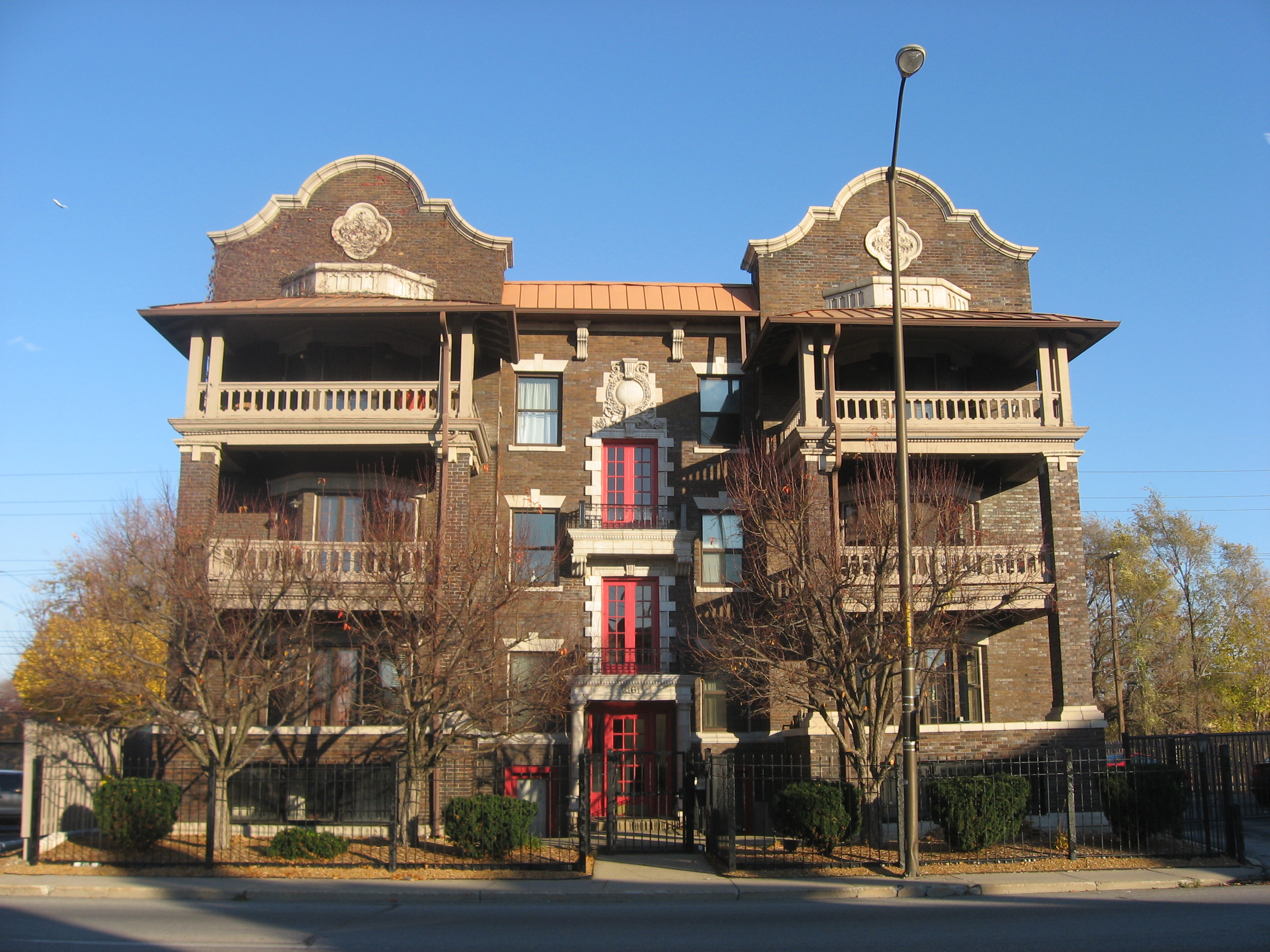
- Coulter Flats, November 2010

- Location within Indianapolis Location within Indiana Location within the United States
- Location: 2161 N. Meridian St., Indianapolis, Indiana
- Coordinates: 39°47′48″N 86°9′25″W
- Area: less than one acre
- Built: 1907
- Architectural style: Tudor Revival, Jacobean Revival
- NRHP reference No.: 90000807
- Added to NRHP: May 31, 1990

Coulter Flats also known as The Coulter, is a historic apartment building in Indianapolis, Indiana. It was built in 1907, and is a three-story, six bay by six bay, Tudor Revival / Jacobean Revival style brick building with terra cotta ornamentation on a raised basement. It is of hollow tile and concrete framing. It features porches and Flemish gables.

It was listed on the National Register of Historic Places in 1990.

== See also ==
- National Register of Historic Places listings in Center Township, Marion County, Indiana
