= George E. Cutler =

American merchant

George Emanuel Cutler (c. 1864 – November 16, 1929) was an American wholesale produce merchant and member of the New York Mercantile Exchange. He is best known for jumping to his death out of the window of his lawyer's seventh-floor Manhattan office after the Wall Street crash of 1929.

== Career ==
Cutler was a native of Ionia, Michigan. A high school principal in the western United States, he later relocated to New York. His home was in the Chester Hill section of Mount Vernon, New York. He was prominent in civic affairs there, having served two terms as a school trustee. He also participated in community and hospital drives for funds in Mount Vernon.

== Death ==
He leaped to his death from a seventh-floor window of the Munson Building, which had entrances at 67 Wall Street and 85 Beaver Street. Cutler reputedly lost a fortune in the Wall Street crash of 1929 and made his plunge while he was visiting the law offices of Fitch and Grant, located in the Munson Building. He tried unsuccessfully to see a particular attorney named Grant C. Fox.

Cutler climbed through a window overlooking Beaver Street and then out on a ledge. A lawyer, Robert Hawthorne, tried unsuccessfully to pull him back inside by grabbing the tail of Cutler's coat before he lost his grip. Cutler fell to his death on to an automobile parked near the junction of Wall Street, Pearl Street, and Beaver Street.
