= Cutler J. Cleveland =

American economist (born 1956)

- Born: January 21, 1956 (age 70)
- Education: Cornell University (BS); Louisiana State University (MS); University of Illinois Urbana-Champaign (PhD)
- Occupations: Author; consultant; academic; business executive
- Spouse: Karen Lefkowitz
- Children: 2

Cutler J. Cleveland (born January 21, 1956) is an American author, consultant, academic, and business executive. He is currently interim director of Boston University's Institute for Global Sustainability. His research primarily involves natural resources, energy use, and their related economies. Cleveland is the editor-in-chief of the Encyclopedia of Energy and winner of an American Library Association award. He is also the founding editor-in-chief of the Digital Universe Encyclopedia of Earth.

== Early life ==
Cutler Cleveland holds a B.S. in Ecology and Systematics from Cornell University, a M.S. in Marine Science from Louisiana State University, and a Ph.D. in Geography from the University of Illinois at Urbana-Champaign in 1988.

== Career ==
Cleveland is Professor of Geography and Environment at Boston University, where he also is on the faculty of the Center for Energy and Environmental Studies (CEES).

Cleveland is a member of the American Statistical Association's Committee on Energy Statistics, an advisory group to the Department of Energy. He has been a consultant to private and public organizations, including the Asian Development Bank, the United Nations Commission on Sustainable Development, Charles River Associates, the Technical Research Centre of Finland, the US Department of Energy, and the United States Environmental Protection Agency.

He has been published in Nature, Science, Energy, Resource and Energy Economics, and Ecological Economics.

Cleveland has received a number of awards for his work, including an Adelman-Frankel Award from the United States Association of Energy Economics for "unique and innovative contributions to the field of energy economics". He has won publication awards from the International Association of Energy Economics, the American Library Association, and the National Wildlife Federation.

== Personal life ==
Cutler Cleveland is married to Karen Lefkowitz. They have two children, Molly Alexandra Cleveland and Sam Cutler Cleveland.

== Works ==
=== Books ===
- Cleveland, Cutler J.; Stern, David I.; Costanza, Robert (Eds.) The Economics of Nature and the Nature of Economics, Advances in Ecological Economics Series, Edward Elgar Publishing, 2007. ISBN 1-85898-980-9
- Cleveland, Cutler J.; Morris, Christopher G. (Eds.) Dictionary of Energy: Expanded Edition, Elsevier Science; 2009. ISBN 978-0-08-096491-1
- Hall, Charles A. S.; Cleveland, Cutler J.; Kaufmann, Robert. Energy and Resource Quality: The Ecology of the Economic Process, University Press of Colorado, 1992. ISBN 0-87081-258-0
- Cleveland, Cutler J.; Kaufman, Robert K. Environmental Science, McGraw-Hill, 2007. ISBN 0-07-298429-5
- Cleveland, Cutler J. (Ed.) Concise Encyclopedia of the History of Energy, Academic Press, 2009. ISBN 978-0-12-375117-1
- Cleveland, Cutler J. Energy and the Environment, Asian Development Bank, 2001. ISBN 971-561-371-3

=== Journal articles ===
- Cleveland, Cutler J.; Ruth, Matthias (September 1997). "When, where, and by how much do biophysical limits constrain the economic process?: A survey of Nicholas Georgescu-Roegen's contribution to ecological economics". Ecological Economics. 22 (3): 203–223. doi:10.1016/S0921-8009(97)00079-7.
