= Rolltop desk =

Type of writing desk

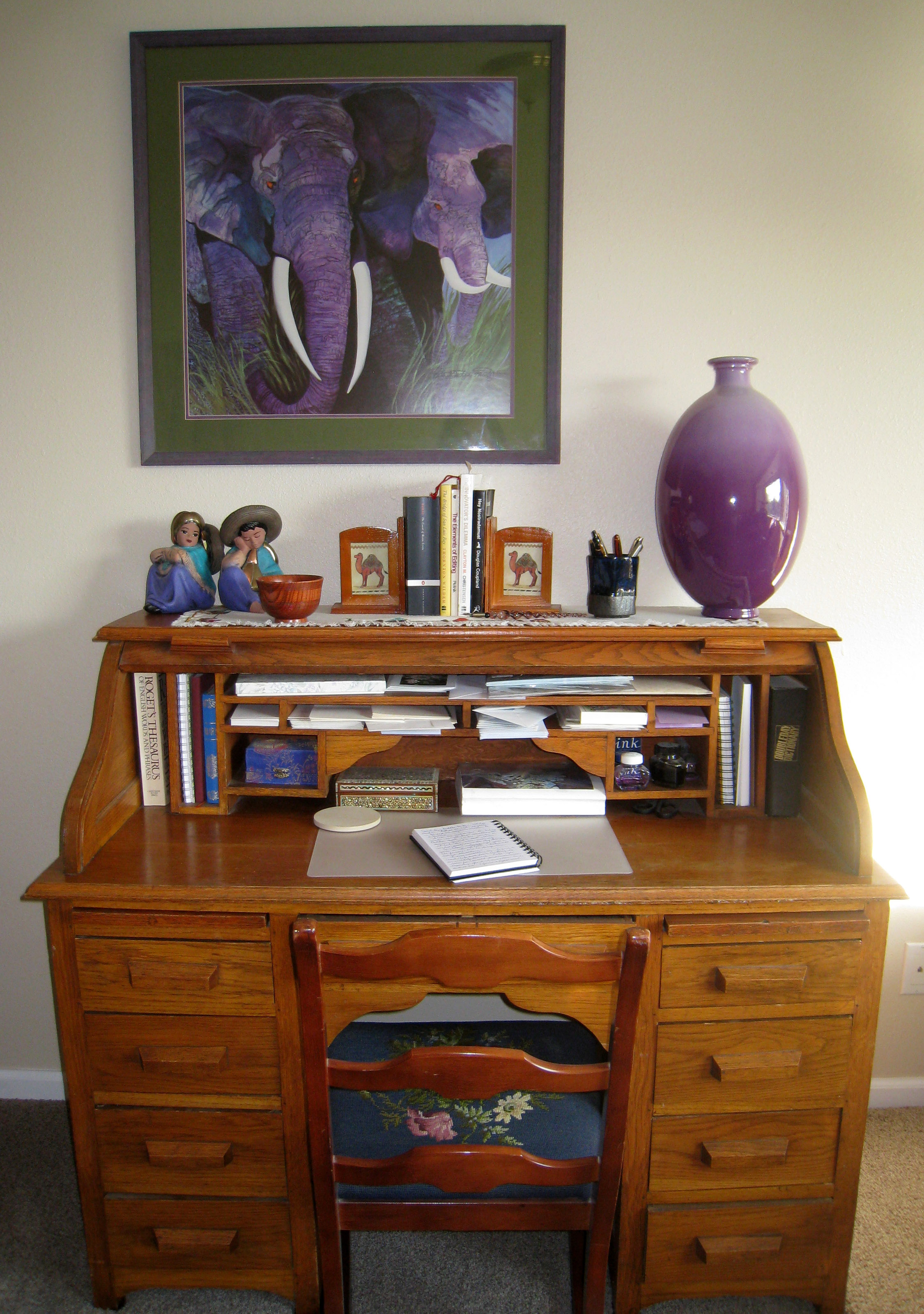
An opened rolltop desk

A rolltop desk is a 19th-century reworking of the pedestal desk with, in addition, a series of stacked compartments, shelves, drawers and nooks in front of the user, much like the bureau à gradin or the Carlton House desk. In contrast to these, the compartments and the desktop surface of a rolltop desk can be covered by means of a tambour consisting of linked wooden slats that roll or slide through slots in the raised sides of the desk. In that, it is a descendant in function, and partly in form, of the cylinder desk of the 18th century. It is a relative of the tambour desk, whose slats retract horizontally rather than vertically.

Jean-François Oeben is sometimes credited with designing the original rolltop desk around 1760, however his Bureau du Roi (completed by Jean Henri Riesener after Oeben's death) was a cylinder desk. The US Patent Office issued a patent for the first American-made rolltop desk to Abner Cutler of Buffalo, NY in 1882.

== Production ==
Unlike the cylinder desk, the rolltop desk could be mass-produced rather easily since the simple wooden slats could be turned out very fast in a uniform way. In contrast, the wooden section of a cylinder had to be treated with great pains to keep its form perfectly over time, lest it warp or bend, and make it impossible to retract or extend. The wooden slats of the rolltop's tambour were usually joined together by being all attached to a cloth or leather foundation, and were thus less influenced by the problems which plagued the cylinder desk.

== Usage ==
The rolltop desk was the mainstay of the small or medium-sized office at the end of the 19th century and the beginning of the 20th.

Because it was produced in vast numbers and at varying levels of quality, the rolltop desk is popular in the antique market. It is usually expensive especially if the wood used is expensive. It is also popular amongst set decorators who want to recreate the ambience of an office of the late 19th or early 20th century.

== Gallery ==
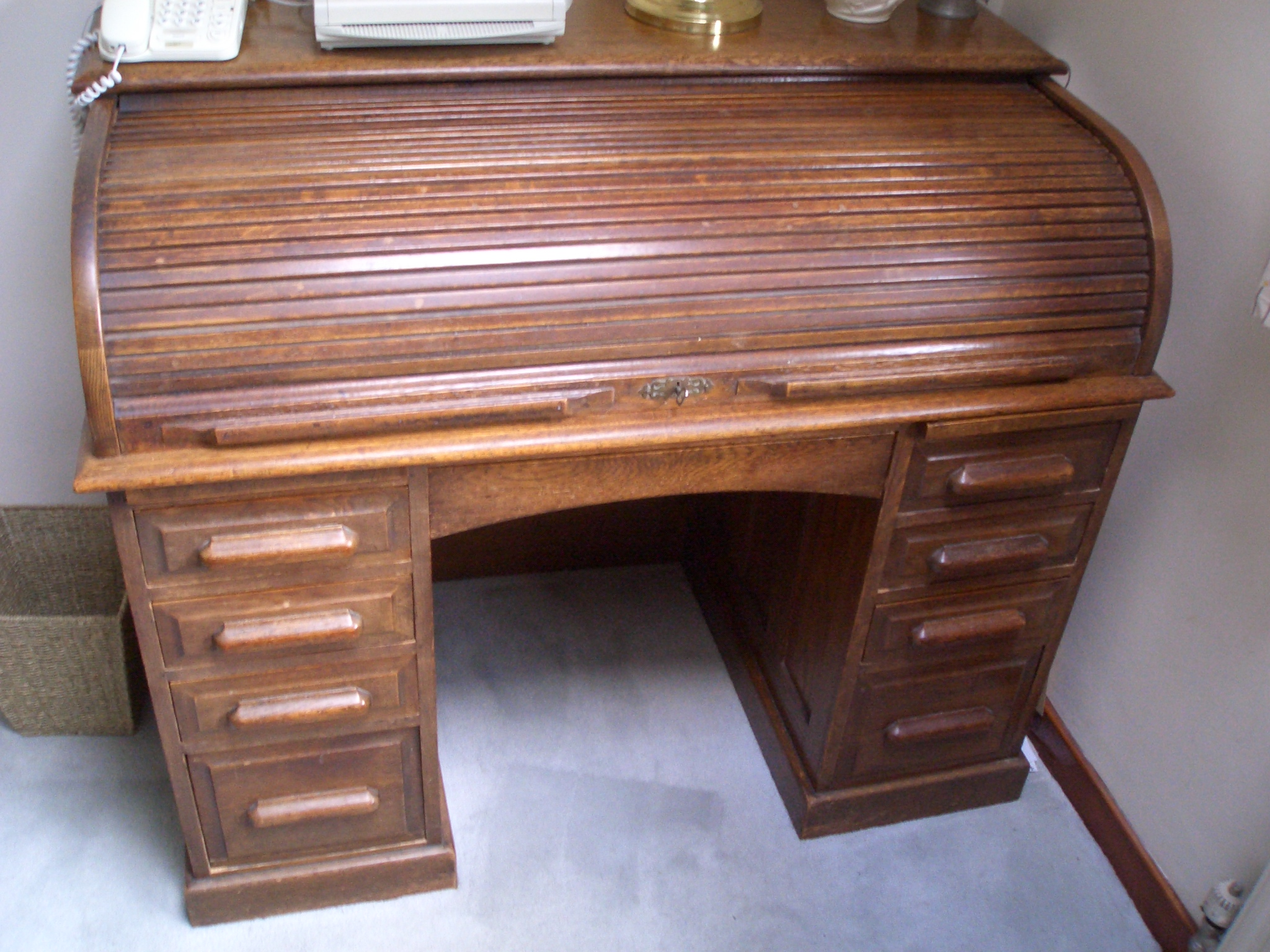
Typical rolltop desk

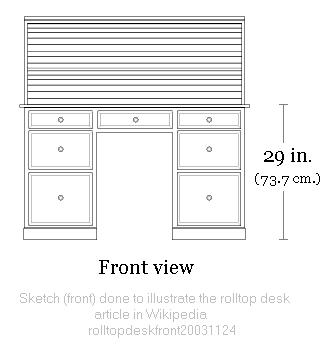

A man using a rolltop desk in the early 20th century

== See also ==
- List of desk forms and types
- A. Cutler & Son
