= Eric Cutler (footballer) =

English footballer (1900–??)

Personal information
- Full name: Eric Richmond Cutler
- Date of birth: 1900
- Place of birth: Codsall, England
- Position: Inside forward

Senior career*
Years	Team	Apps	(Gls)
1919–1921	Wolverhampton Wanderers	18	(4)
Total		18	(4)
- * Club domestic league appearances and goals

Eric Richmond Cutler (born 1900) was an English footballer who played in the Football League for Wolverhampton Wanderers.
