= Cutler Park (Visalia, California) =

Park in California, United States

- Interactive map of Cutler Park
- Type: Urban park
- Location: East, Visalia, California
- Coordinates: 36°21′00″N 119°13′42″W
- Area: 70 acres (28 ha)
- Created: 1919
- Operator: Tulare County Department of Parks & Recreation
- Open: All year

Cutler Park is a large municipal park at the eastern end of Visalia, California near Venice Hills. The park covers 70 acres (0.28 km^{2}; 0.11 sq mi) of land. It is one of the largest Valley Oak Woodlands in Central California.

== History ==
In 1919, John Cutler Jr. donated a heavily wooded 70-acre (280,000 m^{2}) parcel to the County of Tulare for a park. Located adjacent to the St. Johns River on Houston Avenue, the park was named in honor of the donor's father, John cutler, an 1852 pioneer of Tulare County. The senior Cutler was a big farmer and one of Tulare County's first judges.
