= Lizzie Petit Cutler =

American novelist

- Born: 1831; Milton
- Died: January 16, 1902 (aged 70–71); Richmond
- Resting place: Riverview Cemetery
- Occupation: Writer

Lizzie Petit Cutler (1831 - January 16, 1902) was an American writer.

== Biography ==
Lizzie Petit Cutler was born in Milton, Albemarle County, Virginia. Her ancestry, on the paternal side, consisted of farmers; on the mother's side, she descended from Monsieur Jean Jacques Marie René de Motteville Bernard, an early émigré to the colonies, driven from France by political disabilities. Monsieur de Bernard married in Virginia, and lived on his wife's estates on the James River. Cutler was left motherless in her early childhood. She was brought up by her grandmother and aunt, on a farm near Charlottesville, Virginia. As a child, she scribbled rhymes and wrote little stories for her own and her cousin's amusement.

At the age of thirteen, she removed to Charlottesville, where the chaperonage of her aunt enabled her to mingle in the society of the city. Cutler attended classes until age 14 at a seminary in Charlottesville, Virginia. After that, her education was irregular.

Her first novel, Light and Darkness (New York, 1855), was brought out by the Messrs. Appleton, and was republished in London and translated into French. This was followed by Household Mysteries, a Romance of Southern Life (1856), written at the suggestion of Mr. Appleton. This book was written in the vortex of New York society.

After eighteen months' rest, Cutler wrote again; but being advised unwisely, avoided the Appletons, and proffered her manuscript to the Harpers, who rejected her work. After this, the Appletons also refused it. This was a great disappointment to the young girl; and her means becoming limited, she was induced to give a series of dramatic readings, which were so successful that she was thinking of going upon the stage, encouraged by the applause. While preparing herself for a "star engagement” proffered her, she nearly lost her life when her gown accidentally caught on fire. She was saved by the presence of mind of her friend Mr. Oakley. This severe affliction caused her to pass several months of suffering on her couch; but she was gradually restored to health by the affectionate care of her many friends. One among these, Mr. Cutler, so endeared himself by his attentions that upon her recovery she married him, around 1858; he was a New York lawyer.

The Stars of the Crowd, or Men and Women of the Day was published in 1858. In 1860, she delivered a series of public readings. In 1877, Cutler and the singer, Agnes Storrs Vedder, gave a series of receptions devoted to music and dramatic recitations.

Cutler died January 16, 1902. She was buried at Riverview Cemetery in Richmond, Virginia.
