= Cutler, Wisconsin =

- Town
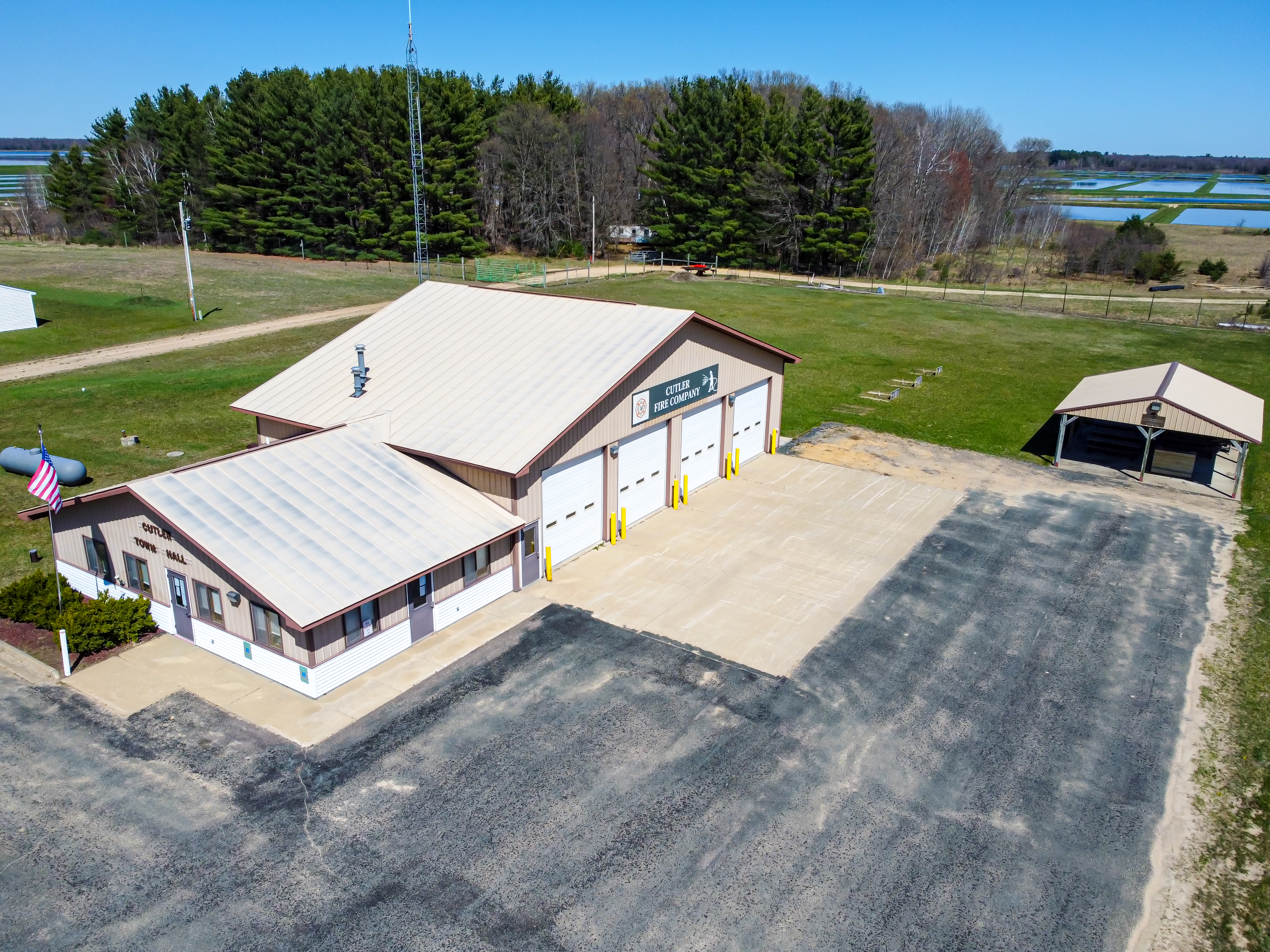
- Cutler Town Hall

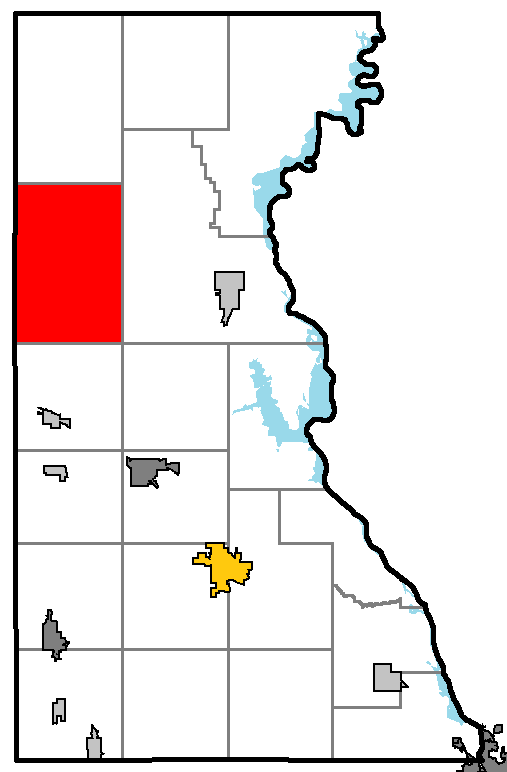
- Location of Cutler, Juneau County

- Location of Juneau County, Wisconsin
- Coordinates: 44°2′33″N 90°16′23″W
- Country: United States
- State: Wisconsin
- County: Juneau

Area
  - Total: 54.0 sq mi (139.9 km^{2})
  - Land: 52.2 sq mi (135.1 km^{2})
  - Water: 1.9 sq mi (4.8 km^{2})
- Elevation: 922 ft (281 m)

Population (2020)
  - Total: 300
  - Density: 5.8/sq mi (2.2/km^{2})
- Time zone: UTC-6 (Central (CST))
  - Summer (DST): UTC-5 (CDT)
- Area code: 608
- FIPS code: 55-18225
- GNIS feature ID: 1583040
- Website: http://www.townshipofcutler.com/

Cutler is a town in Juneau County, Wisconsin, United States. The population was 300 at the 2020 census. The town was named in honor of Charles "Fred" Cutler, who had been the Juneau County clerk for thirty years.

== Geography ==
According to the United States Census Bureau, the town has a total area of 54 square miles (139.9 km^{2}), of which 52.2 square miles (135.1 km^{2}) is land and 1.9 square miles (4.8 km^{2}) (3.44%) is water.

== Demographics ==
As of the census of 2000, there were 282 people, 119 households, and 81 families residing in the town. The population density was 5.4 people per square mile (2.1/km^{2}). There were 147 housing units at an average density of 2.8 per square mile (1.1/km^{2}). The racial makeup of the town was 98.58% White, 1.06% Native American, 0.35% from other races. Hispanic or Latino people of any race were 0.35% of the population.

There were 119 households, out of which 28.6% had children under the age of 18 living with them, 59.7% were married couples living together, 6.7% had a female householder with no husband present, and 31.1% were non-families. 28.6% of all households were made up of individuals, and 13.4% had someone living alone who was 65 years of age or older. The average household size was 2.37 and the average family size was 2.87.

In the town, the population was spread out, with 23.8% under the age of 18, 5.3% from 18 to 24, 27.3% from 25 to 44, 23.8% from 45 to 64, and 19.9% who were 65 years of age or older. The median age was 42 years. For every 100 females, there were 100 males. For every 100 females age 18 and over, there were 99.1 males.

The median income for a household in the town was $37,813, and the median income for a family was $50,938. Males had a median income of $33,125 versus $26,250 for females. The per capita income for the town was $17,591. None of the families and 1.5% of the population were living below the poverty line.

== See also ==
- List of towns in Wisconsin
