= Cylinder desk =

Writing table with small stacked shelves

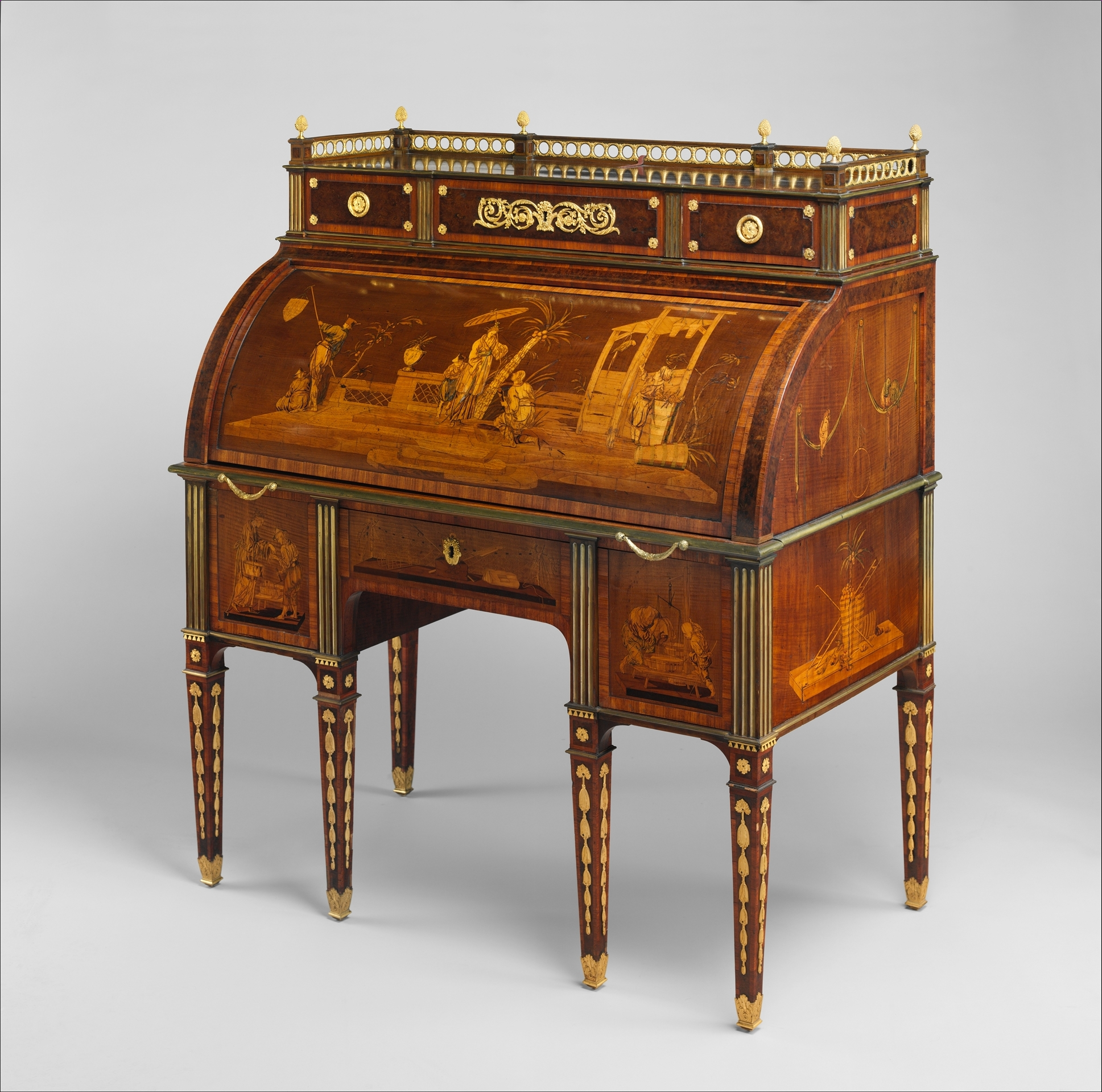
German, Neuwied am Rhein, circa 1776 –79.

The cylinder desk is a desk that resembles a Bureau Mazarin or a writing table equipped with small stacked shelves in front of the user's main work surface, and a revolving cylinder part that comes down to hide and lock up the working papers when the desk is not in use.

Like the rolltop desk, which was invented much later, the cylinder desk usually has a fixed work surface: the paperwork does not have to be stored before the desk is shut. Some designs, however, have the capacity to slide the desk surface out a few inches to expand the available work area.

The cylinder desk is also called "bureau Kaunitz", as it was allegedly introduced in France in the first half of the 18th century by Wenzel Anton von Kaunitz, then the ambassador of the Habsburg Empire to the French court. Regardless of the authenticity of its origin, the French court adopted this type of desk with great enthusiasm.

The difficulty of producing wooden cylinder sections which would not warp over the years ensured that such desks were reserved for the rich. A few variants of this form have slats instead of a one-piece cylinder section.

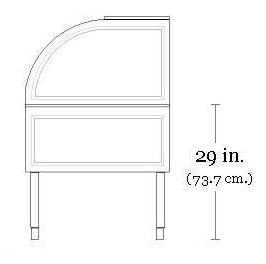

The most famous cylinder desk, and perhaps the most famous desk of all times, is the Bureau du Roi manufactured for the French royalty in the 18th century.

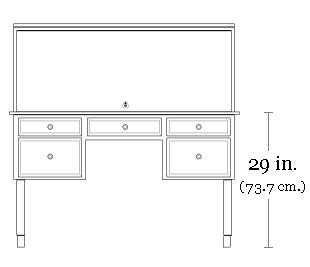
