= Stan Cutler (rugby league) =

Australian rugby league footballer

Personal information
- Full name: Stan Cutler
- Born: 6 August 1952 (age 73) Camperdown, New South Wales, Australia

Playing information
- Position: Fullback, Centre, Wing
Club
Years	Team	Pld	T	G	FG	P
1973–82	Canterbury Bankstown	128	33	58	0	215
- Relatives: Trent Cutler (son)

Stan Cutler nicknamed "Kookaburra" is an Australian former professional rugby league footballer who played in the 1970s and 1980s. He played his entire career for Canterbury in the New South Wales Rugby League premiership. He played in multiple positions across the back line such as fullback, wing or centre.

== Playing career ==
An East Hills junior, Cutler made his debut for Canterbury against Penrith in 1973. In 1974, he played at centre in the grand final defeat by Eastern Suburbs. In 1979, Cutler switched to fullback and played in his second grand final which was won by St George. The following season, Cutler continued to play at fullback but was injured towards the end of the year and missed out on Canterbury's grand final victory in 1980 over Easts. This was Canterbury's first premiership victory in 38 years. Cutler spent a further two seasons with the club but retired at the end of 1982 due to injury. After retirement, Cutler was made a life member of the club. His son Trent also played for Canterbury.
