= Paul Cutler (footballer) =

English footballer (born 1946)

Personal information
- Date of birth: 18 June 1946 (age 80)
- Place of birth: Welwyn Garden City, England
- Position: Winger

Senior career*
Years	Team	Apps	(Gls)
1964–1966	Crystal Palace	10	(1)
1966–1972	Nuneaton Borough		
1969–1970	→ Romford (loan)	23	(2)
1972–1973	Dover		
1972–1973	Ramsgate		
- * Club domestic league appearances and goals

Paul Cutler (born 18 June 1946) is an English former professional footballer who played in the Football League, as a winger.

== Career ==
Cutler was born in Welwyn Garden City and began his youth career with Crystal Palace. He signed professional terms in April 1964 and made his senior debut in November in an away 0–0 draw in the League Cup against Leicester City. He made a scoring league debut in March 1965, in a 1–1 away draw against Northampton Town and made two further appearances that season.

In the 1965–1966 season, Cutler made a further seven appearances, without scoring and at the end of the season, moved into non-league football with Nuneaton Borough. He subsequently played non-league football for Romford, Dover and Ramsgate.
