= Jane Cutler =

American writer

- Born: September 24, 1936 (age 90); Bronx, New York, United States
- Occupation: Writer
- Writing career
- Genre: Fiction
- Subjects: War, cultural difference, and learning disability
- Website: www.janecutler.com

Jane Cutler (born September 24, 1936 in New York) is an American writer, who primarily writes novels for children.

== Biography ==
Cutler was born in 1936 in Bronx, New York, United States. At age 6, she moved to Clayton, Missouri and attended Glenridge School, where she was encouraged to write and participate in sports and drama. She earned a Bachelor of Arts in English at Northwestern University in 1958 and a Master of Arts in creative writing at San Francisco State University in 1982.

After graduating from San Francisco State University, Cutler spent ten years raising her three children before publishing her first book in 1991. Besides her work as a professional book writer, Cutler has taught children's writing and short story writing at San Francisco State University and Foothill College. Cutler currently lives in San Francisco, California. In addition to her children, she also has one grandchild.

== Career and honors ==
Cutler primarily writes books for small children, but she has also written novels for older readers – young adults, including The Song of the Molimo and My Wartime Summers. Though Cutler often chooses serious topics for her writings, such as war, cultural differences, and learning disabilities; her works are described as "never out of reach of her young readers."

In some of her fiction books, Cutler mixes real people and events with imaginary ones. She also does researches about subjects in her works, such as studying about red-legged frog before writing Leap, Frog, and studying about World War II in Europe before writing My Wartime Summers.

Cutler's first picture book for children was Darcy and Gran Don't Like Babies, published in 1993. In 1999, she was chosen by The Bulletin of the Center for Children's Books as one of the rising stars of the year.

Cutler received a Herbert Wilner Award for short fiction in 1982 and a PEN prize for short fiction in 1987. In 1994, her book My Wartime Summers became a Notable Social Studies Trade Book (NCSS/CBC). In 1996, Mr. Carey's Garden garnered her a Show Me Readers Award nomination by Missouri Association of School Librarians. Another book, Rats! was listed among Hawaii’s List of Suggested Titles for the 1998 Nene Award.

The next year, Cutler published Spaceman, which received nominations for a 2000 William Allen White Children's Book Award. Her 1999 children book The Cello of Mr. O was one of her most successful works, receiving a Patterson Prize for Books for Young People, a Zena Sutherland Award for Children's Literature, a New Mexico Land of Enchantment Book Award, and a Golden Kite Award nomination. This book was adapted into a musical in Japan.

Cutler's 1998 book The song of Molimo was nominated for a Lamplighter Award 2001-1002.

== Bibliography ==
Novels

- Family Dinner 1991.
- No Dogs Allowed ("Fraser Brothers" series), illustrated by Tracey Campbell Pearson 1992.
- My Wartime Summers 1994.
- Rats! ("Fraser Brothers" series), illustrated by Tracey Campbell Pearson 1996.
- Spaceman 1997.
- The Song of the Molimo 1998.
- 'Gator Aid ("Fraser Brothers" series), illustrated by Tracey Campbell Pearson 1999.
- Leap, Frog ("Fraser Brothers" series), illustrated by Tracey Campbell Pearson 2001.
- Commonsense and Fowls, illustrated by Lynne Barasch 2005.
- Susan Marcus Bends the Rules 2014

Picture books for children

- Darcy and Gran Don't Like Babies, illustrated by Susannah Ryan 1993.
- Mr. Carey's Garden, illustrated by G. Brian Karas 1996.
- The Cello of Mr. O, illustrated by Greg Couch 1999.
- The Birthday Doll, illustrated by Hiroe Nakata 2001.
- Rose and Riley, illustrated by Thomas F. Yezerski 2005.
- Rose and Riley Come and Go, illustrated by Thomas F. Yezerski 2005.
- Guttersnipe, illustrated by Emily Arnold McCully 2009.
