= Hudson Palmer Homes =

David Cutler Group
- Type: Privately Held
- Industry: Construction
- Founded: 1980
- Headquarters: Plymouth Meeting, Pennsylvania, U.S.
- Key people: David Cutler, Chairman, CEO
- Products: Homes
- Website: www.hudsonpalmerhomes.com

David Cutler Group, renamed Hudson Palmer Homes in 2017, is a Plymouth Meeting, Pennsylvania-based company and the largest privately held residential builder of new luxury homes and luxury communities in the Philadelphia metropolitan area.

== Overview ==
Hudson Palmer Homes, formerly known as the David Cutler Group, is a leading regional homebuilder. Most of its homes are single-family luxury residences and communities in Berks County, Pennsylvania; Bucks County, Pennsylvania; Chester County, Pennsylvania; Montgomery County, Pennsylvania and Delaware County, Pennsylvania. They are one of the few large homebuilders that still practices the building process of "stick-building." A stick-built home is one where the building is completely constructed on site piece-by-piece rather than by pre-fabricated frames.

== New home communities and markets ==
Cities:

- Ambler, Pennsylvania
- Blue Bell, Pennsylvania
- Chalfont, Pennsylvania
- Chester Springs, Pennsylvania
- Collegeville, Pennsylvania
- Doylestown, Pennsylvania
- East Norriton Township, Pennsylvania
- Gwynedd, Pennsylvania
- Harleysville, Pennsylvania
- Hilltown, Pennsylvania
- Horsham, Pennsylvania
- Huntingdon Valley, Pennsylvania
- Jamison, Pennsylvania
- Lansdale, Pennsylvania
- Lower Gwynedd, Pennsylvania
- Malvern, Pennsylvania
- Montgomeryville, Pennsylvania
- Norristown, Pennsylvania
- North Wales, Pennsylvania
- Penllyn, Pennsylvania
- Royersford, Pennsylvania
- Southampton, Pennsylvania
- Thornton, Pennsylvania
- Warrington, Pennsylvania
- Worcester, Pennsylvania

Counties:

- Bucks County, Pennsylvania
- Chester County, Pennsylvania
- Delaware County, Pennsylvania
- Montgomery County, Pennsylvania
- Northampton County, Pennsylvania

== Primary subsidiaries and divisions ==
- HPH Financing
- HPH Conveyancing Division
- HPH Service and Warranty Division

== Principal competitors ==
Companies often competing in the same markets include Centex, D.R. Horton, KB Home, Lennar Corporation, Pulte Homes, Ryland Group Inc, and Toll Brothers.
