= Jon Cutler (musician) =

American house DJ from Brooklyn

Jon Cutler (born 1969) is an American house musician from Brooklyn, New York.

Cutler has lived in New York City all his life. He began DJing at the age of 15, and studied photography at the School of Visual Arts before returning to house music full-time. Cutler began releasing 12-inch remixes on his own Distant Music record label in 1997.

In 2001, Cutler produced the track "It's Yours" (featuring E-Man) for Chez Music, which hit No. 38 on the UK Singles Chart. In 2004, he was featured on the compilation album Afterdark: New York City, which peaked at No. 23 on the U.S. Billboard Top Electronic Albums chart. In 2012, Mat Zo sampled this song for his song "It's Yours" on his Bipolar LP.
