= Arizona serial killer =

Arizona serial killer may refer to:

- The Baseline Killer, an identified serial killer who operated in 2006 in Phoenix, Arizona
- Dale Hausner and Samuel Dieteman, two serial killers who operated from 2005 to 2006, targeting residential homes in drive-by shootings.
