= Doc Willing =

Doc Willing may refer to:

- George M. Willing (c.1829–1874), American physician, prospector, and political lobbyist.
- Oscar Willing (1889–1962), American amateur golfer
