= 8th Arizona Territorial Legislature =

Session of the Arizona Territorial Legislature (1875)

←	7th	9th	→

Overview
- Legislative body: Arizona Territorial Legislature
- Jurisdiction: Arizona Territory, United States

Council
- Members: 9
- President: King S. Woolsey

House of Representatives
- Members: 18
- Speaker: John T. Alsap

The 8th Arizona Territorial Legislative Assembly was a session of the Arizona Territorial Legislature which convened from January 4, 1875, till February 12, 1875, in Tucson, Arizona Territory.

== Background ==
The Indian Wars continued throughout the territory, but General George Crook's strategies were showing clear progress. Beginning in April 1873, a majority of the territory's Apache population began converging on Camp Verde to seek amnesty. In exchange for food and protection, the surrendering Apache agreed to live on reservations and follow the instructions of Indian agents. A secondary benefit of the military action was that the General had ordered his scouts to map the trails they discovered. As a result, many areas previously unknown to American settlers were mapped.

While the 5th Arizona Territorial Legislature had approved building a prison near Phoenix, no funds had been appropriated for its construction. As a result, the territory still lacked a place to incarcerate convicted criminals.

== Legislative session ==
The legislative session began on January 4, 1875.

=== Governor's address ===
Governor Anson P.K. Safford gave his address to the session on January 6, 1875. As with his previous addresses, he gave an overview of the Indian Wars within the territory. Thanking the area military commander for his progress in this conflict, the Governor said, "General Crook, in the subjugation of the Apache, has sustained his former well earned military reputation and deserves the lasting gratitude of our people."

Economically, Safford reported the territory's mines were doing well but that low prices for grain was constraining the prosperity of area farmers. As there was a persistent shortage of qualified candidates willing to work for the offered salary, the Governor recommended doing away with the position Attorney General. Finally he requested creation of voter registration laws and creation of a territorial insane asylum to remove the need of contracting with California to handle the territory's mentally ill.

=== Legislation ===
Representative Granville H. Oury, representing Maricopa County, seeking to rectify an oversight by a previous session, introduced a bill to finance the previously authorized prison in Phoenix. He was outmaneuvered by José M. Redondo, a prominent cattle rancher and irrigation pioneer, and Representative R. B. Kelly, both from Yuma County, who managed to amend the bill to replace "Phoenix" with "Yuma." Thus the resulting US$25,000 bond authorization resulted in the territorial prison being built in Yuma.

In other action, the session permanently located the territorial capital in Tucson, imposed a bullion tax on mined minerals, and created Pinal County from sections of Pima, Maricopa, and Yavapai counties.

== Members ==
House of Representatives
Name	District	Name	District
John T. Alsap (Speaker)	Maricopa	Andrew L. Moeller	Yavapai
Levi Bashford	Yavapai	John Montgomery	Pima
Gideon Brooke	Yavapai	W. J. O'Neill	Yavapai
Samuel H. Drachman	Pima	Granville H. Oury	Maricopa
Jesús M. Elías	Pima	Samuel Purdy Jr.	Yuma
H. Goldberg	Yavapai	Hugo Richards	Yavapai
F. M. Griffin	Pima	Alphonso Rickman	Pima
C. P. Head	Yavapai	George H. Stevens	Pima
R. B. Kelly	Yuma	S. W. Wood	Mohave

Council
Name	District
Peter R. Brady	Pima
John G. Campbell	Yavapai
A. E. Davis	Mohave
Sidney R. DeLong	Pima
J. P. Hargrave	Yavapai
José M. Redondo	Yuma
Lewis A. Stevens	Yavapai
King S. Woolsey (President)	Maricopa
William Zeckendorf	Pima
