= James D. Monihon =

American businessman and politician (1837–1904)

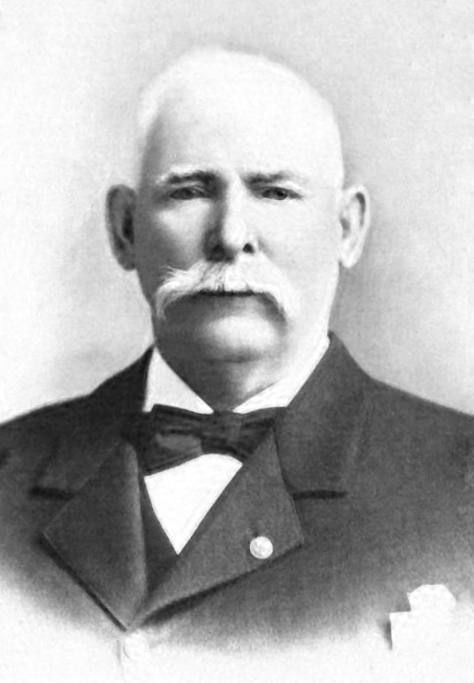

12th and 16th Mayor of Phoenix
- In office 1894 – May 11, 1895
- Preceded by: P. J. Cole
- Succeeded by: R. L. Rosson
- In office June 4, 1896 – 1897
- Preceded by: Frank B. Moss
- Succeeded by: John C. Adams

Personal details
- Born: November 6, 1837 Oneida County, New York, US
- Died: September 2, 1904 (aged 66) Phoenix, Arizona Territory
- Party: Republican
- Spouse: Josie C. Linville (m. 1877)

James D. Monihon (November 6, 1837 – September 2, 1904) was an American businessman and politician. He was a signatory to the formation of the Salt River Valley Town Association, the first government of the area that became Phoenix, and later served on the board of supervisors and as mayor of Phoenix.

== Early years, mining, military service ==
Monihon was born to James and Ann (Martin) Monaghan, Irish immigrants, in Oneida County, New York on November 6, 1837. When he was two, his family moved to St. Lawrence County where he grew up on a farm and attended local schools. Monihon joined the California Gold Rush in 1854, traveling by sea via the Isthmus of Panama. After reaching San Francisco, California, he became involved in placer mining often around Howland Flat, Sierra County until 1861.

At the beginning of the Civil War, Monihon enlisted in Company F of the 1st California Infantry Regiment. While in the military, he served throughout the area that composes modern day Arizona and New Mexico. As Chief of the Howitzer division he fired a celebratory salute in Tucson on July 4, 1862. Ten days later he saw action during the Battle of Apache Pass when his unit of 64 soldiers was attacked by over 450 Apache Indians led by chief Cochise.

Following the battle, his unit spent two months in Mesilla before being redeployed to Fort Craig. In late 1863, Monihon's unit was ordered to Fort Wingate. From there they continued to the Chino valley where they established Fort Whipple. Monihon served as Provost Sergeant at his new posting until his discharge at the end of the war.

He remained in central Arizona, where he worked in mining again for several years and ran a livery stable in Prescott. Much of his mining work was as engineer of the mill at the Big Bug mine. In 1868, Monihon sold the livery business, the Plaza Feed and Livery Stable, to Gideon Brooke and Jacob Linn.

George M. Willing tried to sell him half ownership in the fraudulent Peralta land grant for $250 (~$5,759 in 2025) in 1867. Willing suggested that the two of them could reap a sizable profit by selling nearby mines back to their owners. Monihon was incensed by the offer and rebuffed Willing who quickly left town. Almost 30 years later, Monihon testified as a principal witness for the government about this in court after the fraud was exposed. Monihon relocated to Wickenburg and in March 1869, opened the Wickenburg Feed and Sale Stable.

== Phoenix ==
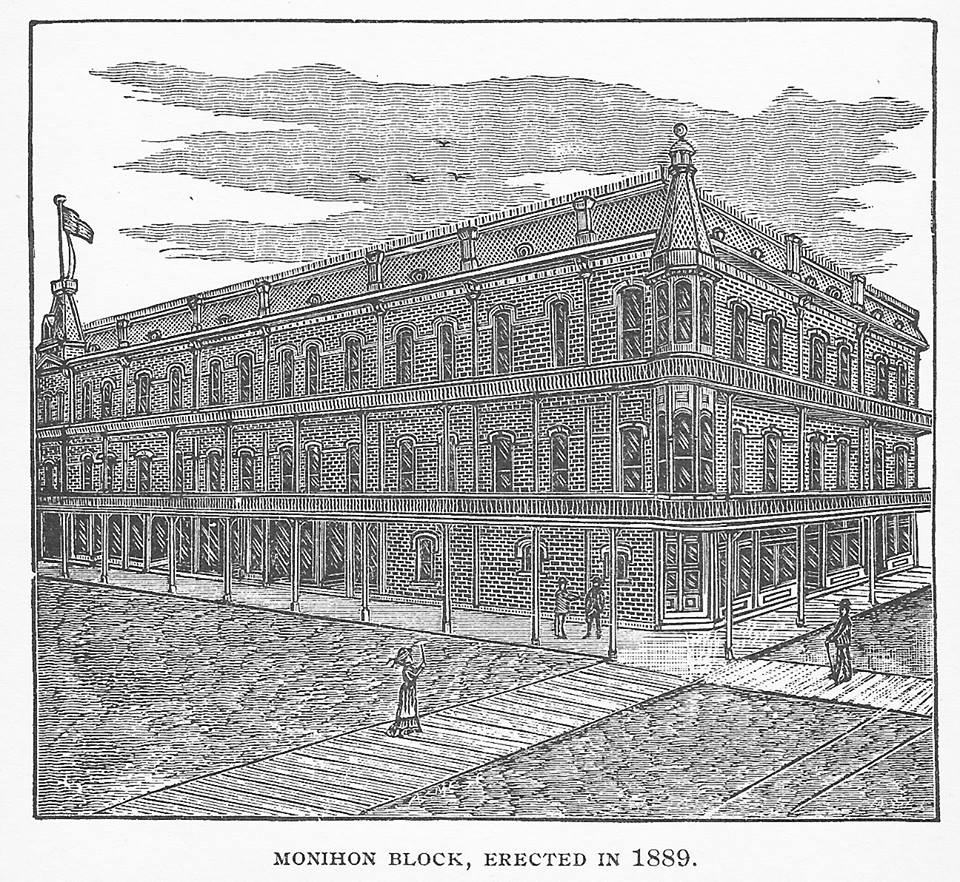
The Monihon Building, as depicted in the 1892 Phoenix Directory

A year later, he was in Phoenix where he built what is claimed to be Phoenix's second house. He was one of the first builders in the area, using adobe techniques suited for the available materials.

In 1870, he was a signatory to the formation of the Salt River Valley Town Association, the first government of the area that became Phoenix. On January 17, 1871, he planted the first Cottonwood tree in the town.

He partnered with Captain Hancock in 1871 to erect the first Maricopa County Courthouse which they rented to the county as the seat of the county government. The city's first public school was located there and the first District Court for Maricopa County held its initial session in the building which also acted as the civic center of the city. When the county moved out in 1875, the building was used as a Justice of the Peace office for many years.

In May 1872, he built a barn and corral for the Starar Brothers, from which they ran the Phoenix Livery, Feed, and Sales Stables on the corner of Washington Street and First Avenue. Monihon was paid with a one-third ownership interest in the business. At some point, Monihon bought out his partners and became sole owner. He operated the business for ten years. (Note: another source says Monihon sold the business in 1875, only four years after opening)

He was on the board of supervisors in 1874, and was nominated to run in the first mayoral election as the Republican candidate after Phoenix was incorporated in 1881. He lost by seven votes (Note: another source says the vote was 127-102) but was elected councilman the next year.

He left Phoenix for a period of six years but returned from the east in 1889 and became chairman of the board of directors of the Insane Asylum of Phoenix which had opened two years earlier. (Note: now the Arizona State Hospital)

The next year, he built a large building on part of the stable grounds. The Monihon building was at the time considered "the finest edifice in Arizona". It was torn down in the mid-1930s.

== Mayor ==
He ran for Phoenix mayor a second time in 1892, being unanimously nominated at the Republican city convention, and was again defeated, this time losing 268 to 198. Monihon continued to be active in the party, and organized "the greatest political gathering in the territory", a rally of the Republican party in Maricopa County in September 1892. He was victorious in his third run in May 1894, winning by a large majority of 388 to 234 and leading a Republican sweep of all positions in the city election. He failed to win the Republican nomination in 1895 to Pierce Evans who lost the election to the Democratic candidate. Monihon regained the Republican nomination and won the next election in June, 1896 by a vote of 268 to 238. He received the party nomination again in 1899, but not the endorsement of the Arizona Republican, which endorsed every other Republican on the ticket for city offices. He lost the election.

As mayor, he spoke at a ceremony marking the completion of the Santa Fe, Prescott and Phoenix Railway in March 1895 and presented a gold key to the Vice President of the railroad in appreciation for connecting Phoenix with the Atchison, Topeka and Santa Fe Railway network via Prescott and on to the mainline at Prescott Junction.

== Personal life ==
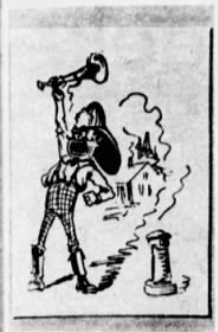
Cover art of a 1891 invitation from Monihon to a Phoenix Fire Department fundraiser masquerade ball

Monihon married Josie C. Linville of Santa Rosa, California on March 15, 1877. The union produced one daughter, Rebecca Ann.

He was a charter member of Phoenix Engine Company #1, Phoenix's first volunteer fire department that was formed in 1886 and was a bucket brigade captain and has been called the "father" of the Phoenix Fire Department.

== Organizations ==
Monihon had an extensive association with Masonry, being a member of the lodge, chapter, commandery, and Mystic Shrine. He served for three terms as grand marshal of the Grand Lodge. He was a member and commander of the Civil War veterans' fraternal organization, Grand Army of the Republic lodge and was a delegate to the 1889 "National Encampment" in Boston.

== Death ==
Monihon died in his home September 2, 1904, in Phoenix.
