= First Security Bank Building =

Building in Salt Lake City, Utah, U.S.

- U.S. National Register of Historic Places
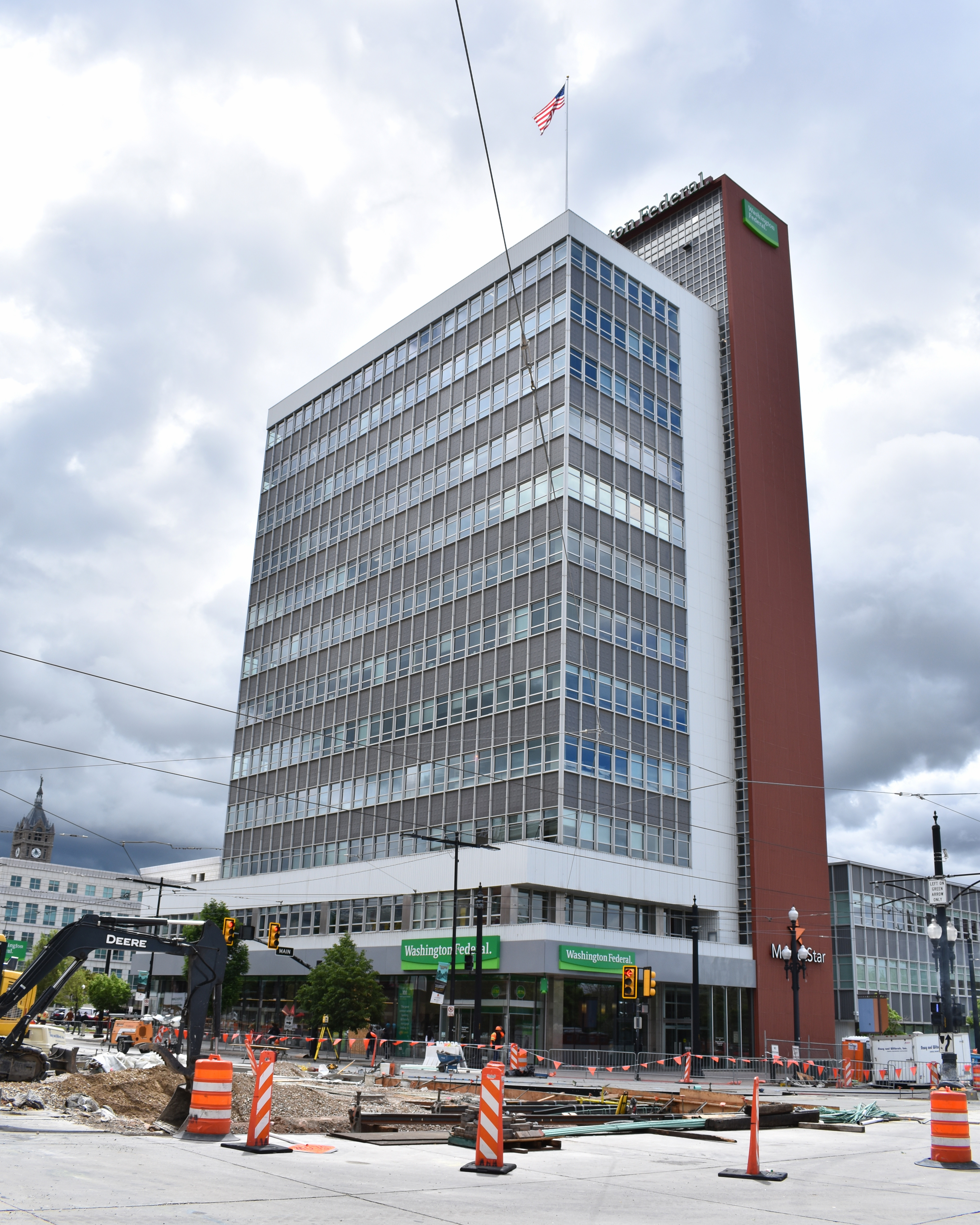
- The First Security Bank Building in 2019

- Location within Utah Location within the United States
- Location: 405 S. Main St., Salt Lake City, Utah
- Coordinates: 40°45′36″N 111°53′23″W
- Area: 1.9 acres (0.77 ha)
- Built: 1954
- Built by: Utah Construction Company
- Architect: Sarmiento, W.A.; Knoebel, W.G.; Winburn, Slack W.
- Architectural style: International Style
- NRHP reference No.: 05001107
- Added to NRHP: September 28, 2005

The First Security Bank Building in Salt Lake City, Utah, is a 12-story International Style commercial structure built in 1954. The building was designed by Wenceslao Sarmiento in consultation with W.G. Knoebel, chief designer for the Bank Building & Equipment Corporation of America, and local supervising architect Slack Winburn. It was listed on the National Register of Historic Places in 2005.

Constructed for the First Security Corporation, the building was the first skyscraper built in Salt Lake City after the Great Depression. In 2000, First Security Corporation was purchased by Wells Fargo, after which the building became largely vacant. Wasatch Property Management purchased the building and rehabilitated it in 2004. After the restoration, Ken Garff Automotive Group moved into the building and its name was changed to the Ken Garff Building. The automotive group left the building in 2017, and the tower was renamed the Washington Federal Bank Building.

The First Security Bank Building has been compared with the United Nations Building, the Lever House, and the PSFS Building because of its glass curtain and cubic shapes, asymmetrical composition, and lack of ornament.
