= Gideon Brooke =

American politician (1814–1881)

Member of the 8th Arizona Territorial Legislature
- In office 1875–1875

Personal details
- Born: c. 1814 Washington, DC
- Died: November 1881 (aged 66–67) San Francisco
- Party: Democratic
- Profession: Politician, Businessman

Gideon Brooke (c. 1814 – November 1881) was an American politician and businessman who was a member of the 8th Arizona Territorial Legislature in 1875. He was a local businessman in Yavapai County, Arizona Territory and served on the Yavapai County Board of Supervisors from 1870 to 1873 and again in 1877–1878. In between, he represented Prescott in the legislature at the territory capital Tucson and was chairman of the Committee on Roads and Ferries.

== Background ==
Brooke was born in Washington, DC in 1814 or 1819. He resided for some time in neighboring Prince George's County, Maryland. He operated a periodical store on Pennsylvania Avenue in Washington called The Literary Depot. It sold a variety of publications including books of literature and other topics including science, medicine, and religion.

== California Gold Rush ==
In 1849, Brooke left for California in pursuit of riches during the gold rush. He was listed as vice-president of the Washington City and California Mining Association (WCCMA), a formal association of 63 individuals who joined together to make the journey to California as a group. The association, or company, had fourteen wagons built and outfitted with provisions for the trip which left on April 2, 1849 from Lafayette Square, adjacent to the White House. They proceeded to the portico of the White House, where Brooke, as one of the company officers, "exchanged courtesies" with President Zachary Taylor. The company then proceeded to the Baltimore & Ohio Railroad depot to travel by train to Cumberland, Maryland, overland to Brownsville, Pennsylvania and then by steamship to Pittsburgh where they stayed for several days until sailing on to Cincinnati, Ohio and then via the Ohio, Mississippi, and Missouri rivers to St. Louis, Missouri where they arrived on April 15. Leaving there on the 20th, passing through Kansas City, they reached St. Joseph, Missouri one week later from where they began the overland trip by mule and wagon. The company crossed the Missouri at Council Bluffs, Iowa and the wagon train, consisting of 13 wagons pulled by 72 mules and four oxen set off across the Great Plains, reaching California seven months later.

In 1851, Brooke was reported to be in Marysville, California and neither he or any of the others from the WCCMA had yet "made fortunes".

== Arizona ==
It is believed that Brooke arrived in the Arizona territory in 1862 or 1863, crossing into the territory over the Colorado River from California. He engaged in placer mining on Lynx Creek for five years.

In 1868, Brooke, along with partner Jacob Linn, purchased the Plaza Feed and Livery Stable from James D. Monihon, located on Goodwin Street, opposite the courthouse plaza. They operated under the name Plaza Feed and Sale Stable. Brooke became sole proprietor of the business in 1876.

Brooke first served as county supervisor from July 15, 1870 through December, 1873. He then was elected to the legislature in the November, 1874 election and served in that position in 1875. He ran again for county supervisor in 1876 and won, having received 416 of the 593 votes cast and was made chairman. He ran as a Democrat.

He was forced to resign from his term as county supervisor in 1878 due to ill health, after which he traveled to San Francisco to seek medical treatment for what he believed was rheumatism. His health also forced him to sell his business for $8,000 which was reported to be a "bargain" price.

He died in November 1881 in San Francisco. His body was shipped to Prescott and was buried in an unmarked grave in Citizens Cemetery.

== Gravestone placement ==
In 2017, the Yavapai Cemetery Association procured a grave marker under its three-year old "Marker Placement Program". The Yavapai County Board of Supervisors provided funding for the gravestone. A ceremony was held on November 8, 2017 to dedicate the gravestone and commemorate Brooke. The current Yavapai County Supervisors attended, as did the Prescott Corral of Westerners International, who provided funding for a grave marker for Jacob Linn. Linn was Brooke's business partner. Linn, a member of the Walker Party was one of the first to arrive in central Arizona in the spring of 1863. Linn died in 1876 in Brooke's home. Brooke and Linn's graves were adjacent.

== Family ==
A brother, Henry H. Brooke, was a prosperous real estate broker in Baltimore, Maryland. A nephew, Robert W. Brooke was a farmer and member of the Maryland Legislature in 1894.
