= Phoenix Financial Center =

High-rise business complex in Arizona

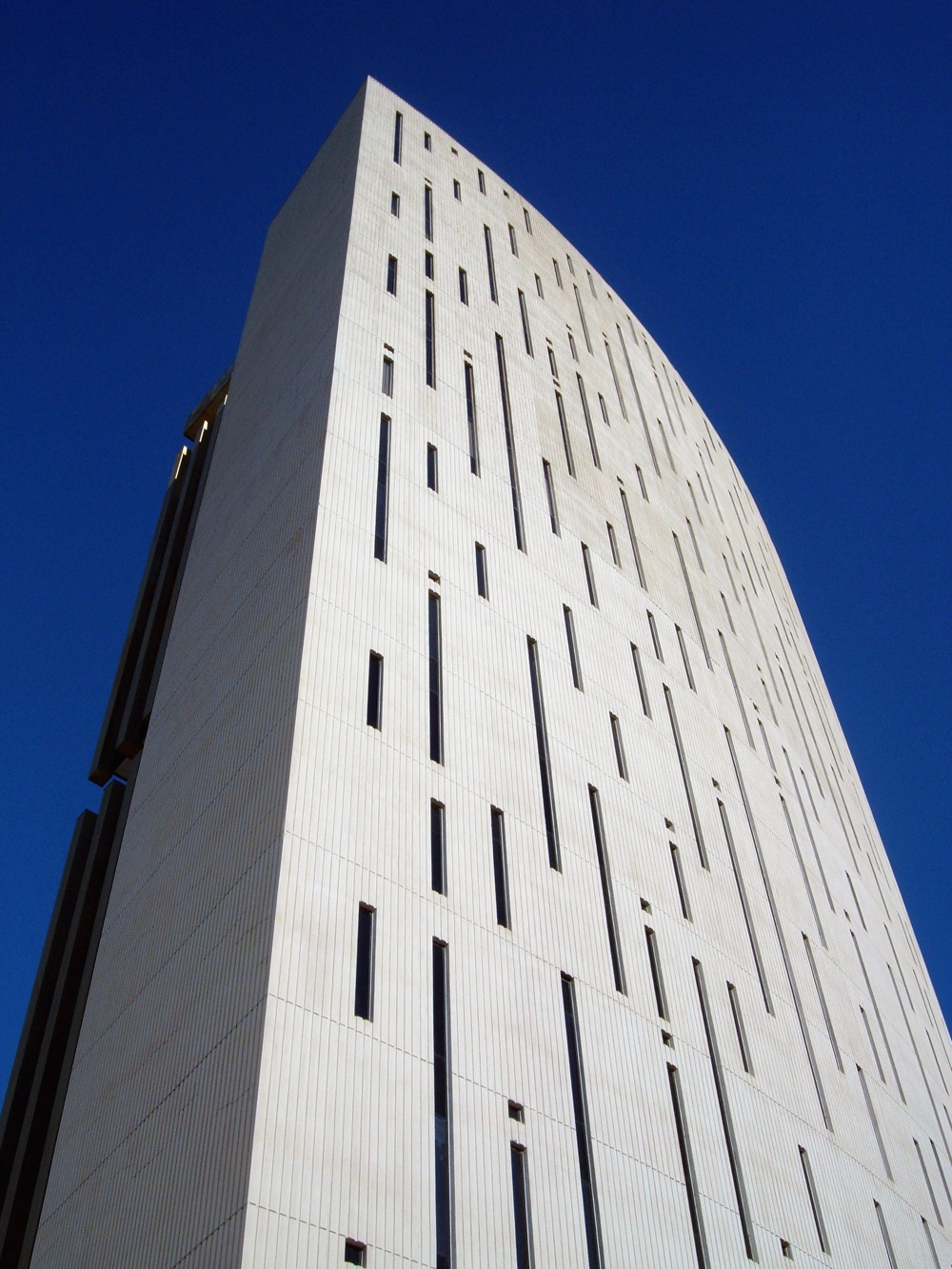
- Phoenix Financial Center looking east from Central Avenue
- Interactive map of the Phoenix Financial Center area

General information
- Status: Completed
- Type: Office
- Location: 3443 North Central Avenue, Phoenix, Arizona
- Coordinates: 33°29′17″N 112°4′23″W
- Construction started: 1964
- Completed: 1968
- Management: Knight & Associates

Technical details
- Floor count: 19

Design and construction
- Architect: Wenceslaus Sarmiento
- Developer: David H. Murdock
- Main contractor: Henry C. Beck Co.

The Phoenix Financial Center consists of a high-rise office building and two adjacent rotunda buildings located along Central Avenue in the Midtown district of Phoenix, Arizona, United States. They were built in 1963 by the Financial Corporation of Arizona. Ground was broken for the facility in September 1963, and the complex was dedicated for opening on September 28, 1964.

The tower fronts Osborn Avenue and is commonly referred to locally as the "Punchcard Building", due to aesthetic similarities between the building's southeastern facade and a computer punch card. Originally, the main tower consisted only of 10 stories; the extra nine were added in 1972. The design included provisions for erecting a second tower that was a mirror image of the first on the north side of the property, but was never built (this area is currently a visitor parking lot). At that time, the building became the headquarters for Western Savings and Loan.

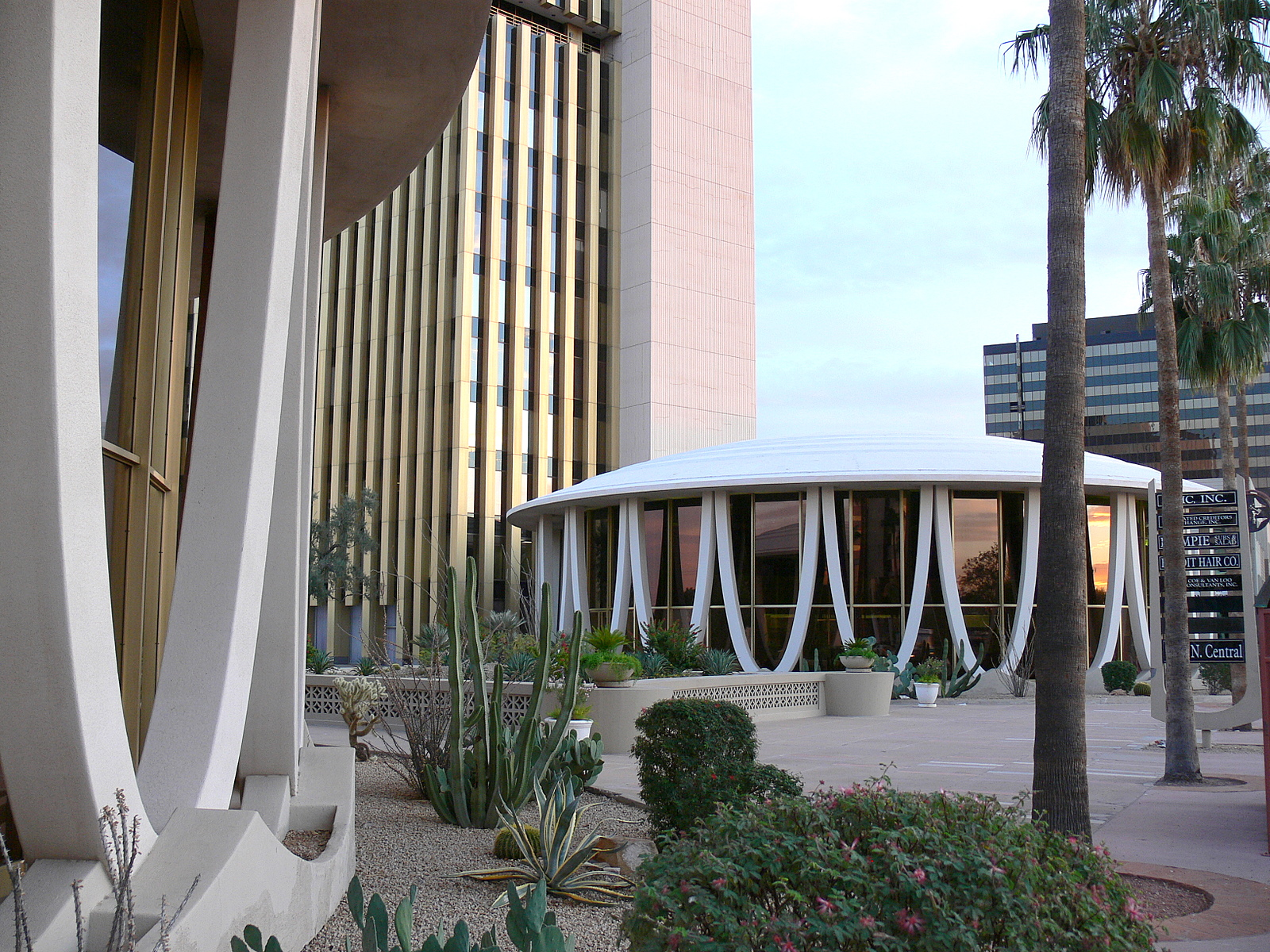
View from Northwest showing the South rotunda. A portion of the tower and North rotunda are also visible.

The two rotundas front Central Avenue and are mirror images of each other. They consist of two stories and a basement, and utilize glass around most of the circumference. Each has a stained glass star at the top of the dome of slightly different designs.

The Phoenix Financial Center is an example of International style architecture, featuring many elements of Googie design. The architect of the building is Wenceslaus Sarmiento. The building is said to be the site of a "fallout-proof" time capsule which was set to be opened in 2012, but the capsule has never been found.

The complex is located close to the Park Central station of METRO Light Rail, which contains displays detailing the history of the Phoenix Financial Center as well as other buildings in the area.

Phoenix Financial Center served as a filming location for the movie What Planet Are You From? which was released in 2000 and directed by Mike Nichols. The film was co-written by, and starred Garry Shandling who grew up in Tucson. The film also featured Ben Kingsley, Annette Bening, John Goodman and Greg Kinnear. Phoenix Financial Center is used as the building where the main character is employed and is featured prominently in many scenes of the film.

Phoenix Financial Center can also be seen briefly in the opening flyover scene of 2016's Bad Santa 2, starring Billy Bob Thornton.

== See also ==
- List of tallest buildings in Phoenix
