= Wenceslao Sarmiento =

American architect

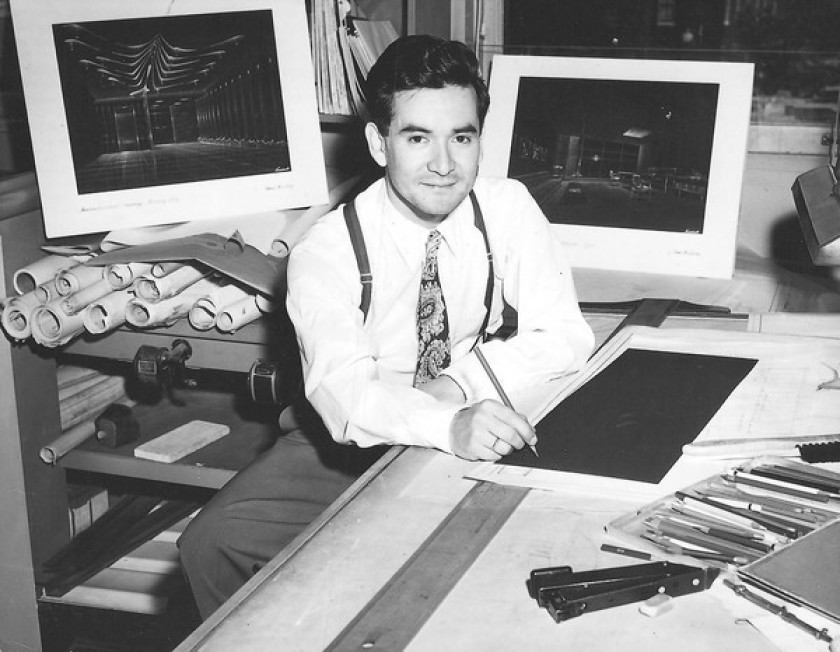
- Sarmiento in 1958
- Born: September 28, 1922; Peru
- Died: November 24, 2013 (aged 91); Santa Monica, California
- Other name: W.A. Sarmiento
- Occupation: Architect
- Practice: Sarmiento Associates
- Buildings: First Security Bank Building, Phoenix Financial Center

Wenceslao Alfonso Sarmiento (September 28, 1922 – 24 November 2013), also known as W.A. Sarmiento, was a Peruvian-born American modernist architect.

Sarmiento studied in various locations in South America, for eighteen months in the office of Oscar Niemeyer, before coming to the United States. In 1951 while visiting his sister-in-law in Missouri he rear-ended an architect who worked for the St. Louis-based Bank Building & Equipment Corporation of America. He was hired soon after and served as the head designer for the corporation from 1951 through 1961, after which he founded his own sixty-person Sarmiento Associates office based in St. Louis, Missouri. He relocated to Santa Monica, California, in the 1970s. He retired in 1980.

Sarmiento designed hundreds of banks and other buildings in the postwar years of bank modernization in downtowns, and the construction of new suburban bank towers. His larger work appears as crisp International Style with a visible influence from Niemeyer, perhaps most obvious in his largest project, the 1968 Phoenix Financial Center on Central Avenue in Phoenix, Arizona. The smaller branch banks tend to be more playful, eye-catching, Googie projects.

Sarmiento lived in Santa Monica, California, and was still active in the preservation of his buildings until his death in 2013.

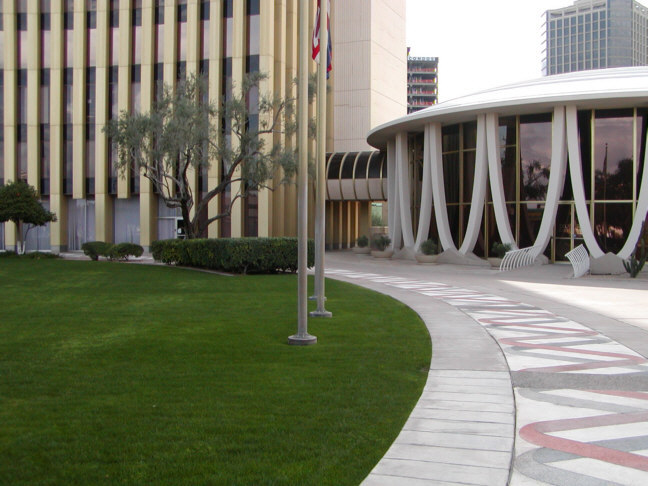
Phoenix Financial Center, Phoenix, Arizona

== Major works ==
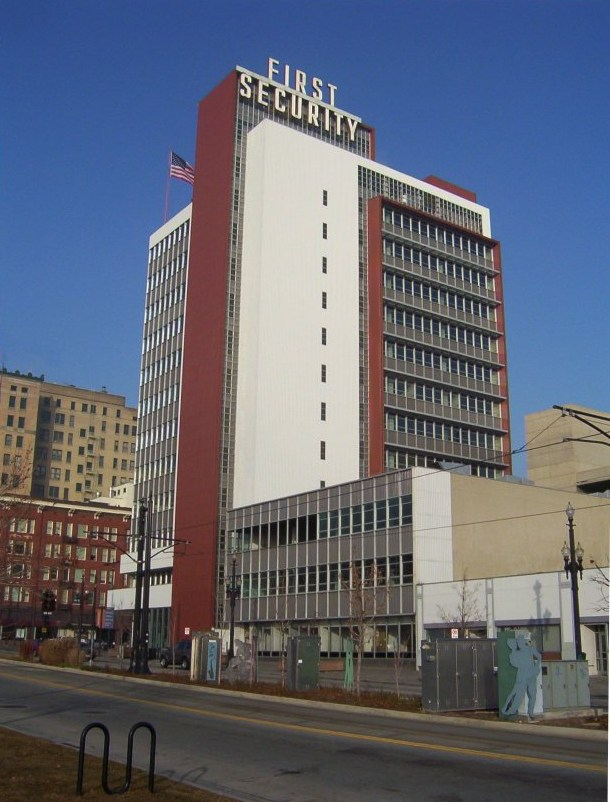
First Security Bank, Salt Lake City, Utah

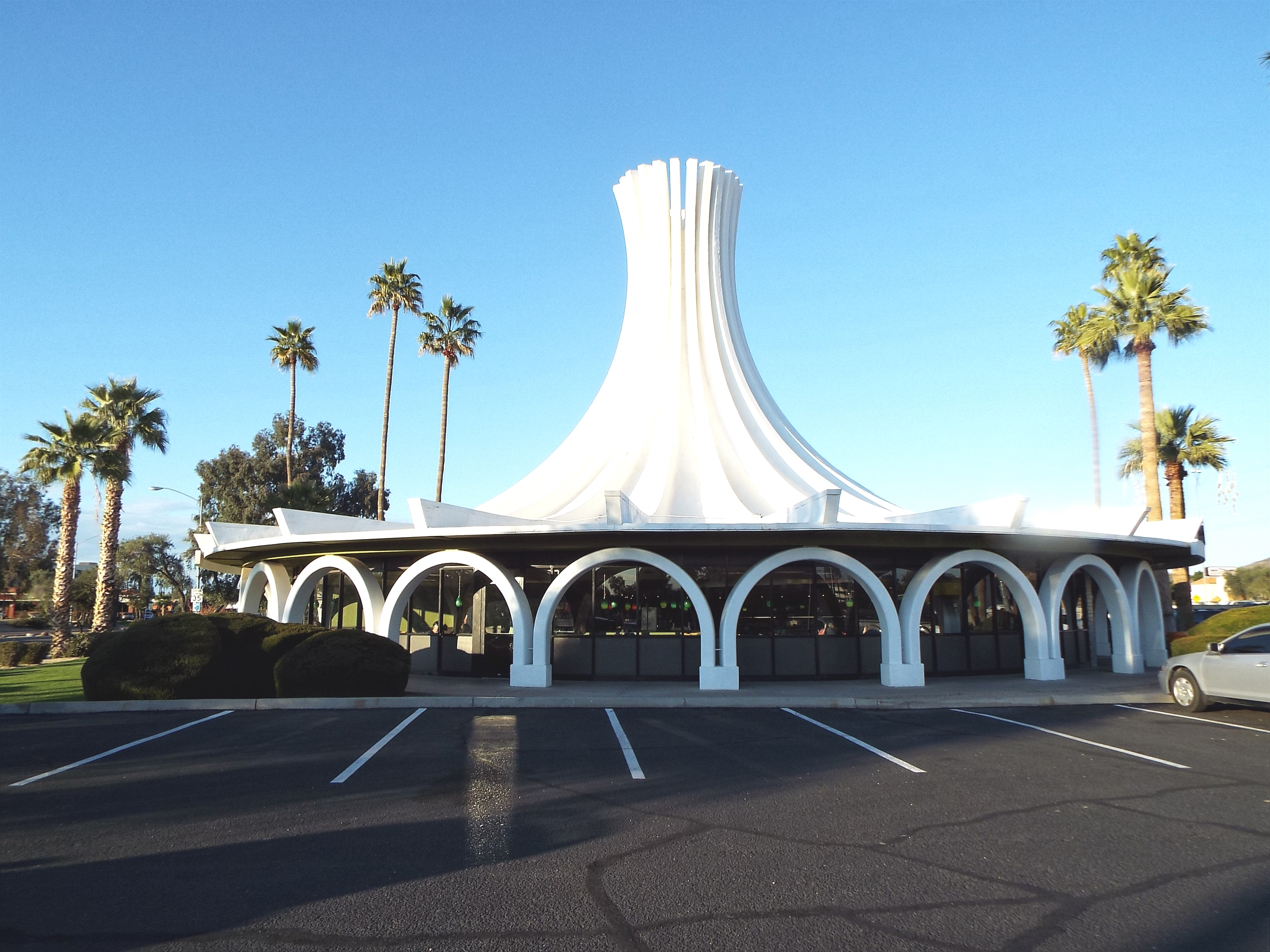
Western Savings, Phoenix, Arizona (now Tombstone Tactical)

- Central Bank of Honduras, Tegucigalpa, Honduras (1952)
- Pioneer Savings Bank Building, 3245 Wilshire Boulevard, Los Angeles, California (1953) - Now Consulate General of the Republic of Korea.
- Newport Balboa Savings, 3366 Via Lido, Newport Beach California, (1954) - Significantly altered.
- First Security Bank Building, 405 S. Main Street, Salt Lake City, Utah (1955) - Now Ken Garff Building, listed on the National Register of Historic Places.
- American Investment Co. of Illinois, 8251 Maryland Avenue, Clayton Missouri (1955)
- Hibernia National Bank, New Orleans, Louisiana (1955)
- Jefferson Bank and Trust Building, 2600 Washington Avenue, St. Louis Missouri (1956)
- Fidelity Federal Savings & Loan Building, 225 E. Broadway, Glendale California (1956) - Now Hollywood Production Center.
- Bank Building & Equipment Corporation of America Headquarters, 1130 Hampton Avenue, St. Louis, Missouri (1957) - Now Salvation Army Midland Division.
- Great Western Savings Bank, 8201 Van Nuys Boulevard, Panorama City, California, (1957) - Now LA Furniture Center.
- Crenshaw Savings & Loan, 4401 Crenshaw Boulevard, Los Angeles, California (1958) - now Chase Bank)
- Firestone Bank, 1115 S. Main Street, Akron, Ohio (1958) - Now Verge Building.
- Glendale Federal Savings and Loan, 401 N. Brand Boulevard, Glendale, California (1959) - Now Hollywood Production Center.
- Liberty National Bank & Trust Building, 416 W. Jefferson Street, Louisville, Kentucky (1960) - Now Chase Bank.
- Security Federal Savings & Loan, (Skyline Building) 2600 Dr. M.L.K. Jr. N. Street, St. Petersburg, Florida (1961)
- Salinas Valley Savings & Loan, 425 Main Street, Salinas, California (1962) - Now Chase Bank.
- Salinas Valley Savings & Loan, 1725 Saratoga Avenue, San Jose, California (1962) - Now Chase Bank.
- Newport Balboa Savings Headquarters Building, 3366 Via Lido, Newport Beach, California (1963) - Significantly altered.
- Phoenix Financial Center, 3443 N. Central Avenue, Phoenix, Arizona (1964-1968)
- Chancery Building, on the grounds of the Cathedral Basilica of St. Louis, 4445 Lindell Boulevard, St. Louis Missouri (circa 1965)
- Ozarks Federal Savings, 2 E. Columbia Street, Farmington, Missouri (1970)
- Clayton Federal Savings and Loan, 135 N Meramec Avenue, Clayton, Missouri (1970) - Now Midwest Regional Bank.
- First National Bank and Trust Building, 233 S 13th Street, Lincoln, Nebraska (1970) - In association with Russell McCaleb. Now US Bank Tower.
- Lemay Bank and Trust Co. 2568 Telegraph Road, St. Louis, Missouri (1972) - Demolished.
- Western Savings at El Con, 3480 E. Broadway Boulevard, Tucson, Arizona (1972) Now Bank of America.
- Western Savings at Metrocenter, 10005 Metro Parkway N., Phoenix, Arizona (1974) - Now Tombstone Tactical.
- Lemay Bank and Trust Co. 5575 Telegraph Road, St. Louis, Missouri (1976) - Now Midwest BankCentre
- American Automobile Association Building, 3940 Lindell Boulevard, St. Louis, Missouri (1977)
