= George M. Willing =

American politician and charlatan (1829–1874)

- In office 1859–Unknown

George Maurice "Doc" Willing, Jr. (c. 1829 – March 12 or 13, 1874) was an American physician, prospector, and political lobbyist. He is known for his time as an unelected delegate to the United States Congress for Jefferson Territory and as the person who introduced James Reavis to the fraudulent Peralta land grant.

== Biography ==
Willing was born to an affluent Philadelphia family. Educated as a physician, he married the daughter of successful merchant, Mary Ann. The young medical practitioner got into trouble by performing abortions, and to escape potential legal problems moved to California in the early 1850s.

By the late 1850s, Willing had resettled in St. Louis, Missouri. He left there in April 1859 to become part of the Pike's Peak Gold Rush. Upon his arrival to the area, he worked in the "Goose Pasture Diggings" for several months. Described by the Rocky Mountain News as a "good geologist and a most polished gentleman", Willing became a candidate for delegate for Jefferson Territory in October 1859. Despite losing the election, he still traveled to Washington D.C. to lobby for the interests of the Pikes Peak area.

While working as a delegate, Willing claimed to have created the name "Idaho." While there is no definitive proof to either confirm or refute this claim, the earliest known usage of the name was within a Congressional committee during 1860. The earliest published account of his claim was in a December 11, 1875 New York Daily Tribune article by Willing's friend, William O. Stoddard. Despite the choice of "Colorado" as the name for the territory organized around the Pikes Peak area, the name "Idaho" became popular in the area and was used as the name for a steamboat, a Colorado town, and a county in Washington Territory before being used for Idaho Territory.

Willing returned to Denver in August 1860. His next confirmed sighting came in Prescott, Arizona Territory during 1867. Willing claimed to have purchased the rights to a large Spanish land grant from a man named Miguel Peralta on October 26, 1864. The transaction had supposedly occurred at a primitive campsite to the southeast of Prescott without the benefit of the typical documentation. Instead of a notarized deed, the conveyance was recorded on a piece of greasy camp paper bearing the signatures of several witnesses. Willing had arrived in Prescott for the purpose of registering the deed. He was at the time low on funds and offered to sell a half interest in the grant to livery stable owner James D. Monihon in exchange for US$250 and the amount of the bill he owed. After filing Willing's papers, the two of them could then use the Spanish claim to sell land back to the settlers currently residing in the area. Monihon refused the offer and informed Willing that he was liable to be lynched if local residents learned of his plans. Willing responded by quickly settling his affairs and joining a governmental survey party leaving town the next morning for Santa Fe.

To assist in development of his land grant, in 1871 Willing sought the aid of James Reavis, a St. Louis real estate agent with forgery skills. The two began meeting with William W. Gitt, a man known as the "Old Spanish Land Title Lawyer" following a series of questionable land transactions, on a regular basis to study Willing's papers. Willing and Reavis eventually decided to form a partnership and Willing left for Arizona Territory in January 1874. He filed his deed in the Yavapai County Courthouse upon his arrival in Prescott and was found dead the next morning. No official investigation as to the cause of Willing's death was ever performed. Suggested causes include poison, "exposure and privation", or simply "strange and unwitnessed circumstances".
