= Samuel Dieteman and Dale Hausner =

American serial killers

Samuel Dieteman
- Born: Samuel John Dieteman; October 17, 1975 (age 50)
- Status: Incarcerated
- Conviction: First degree murder (2 counts)
- Penalty: Life imprisonment without parole

Details
- Victims: 8 killed; 19 injured
- Span of crimes: May 2005 – July 30, 2006
- Country: United States
- State: Arizona
- Date apprehended: August 3, 2006

Dale Hausner
- Born: Dale Shawn Hausner; February 4, 1973; Arizona, U.S.
- Died: June 19, 2013 (aged 40); Florence State Prison, Arizona, U.S.
- Known for: Serial shooting murders
- Convictions: First degree murder (6 counts); Attempted first degree murder (17 counts); Conspiracy to commit first degree murder; Aggravated assault (15 counts); Arson of occupied structure (2 counts); Animal cruelty (9 counts); Conspiracy to commit animal cruelty (2 counts); Drive-by shooting (24 counts); Unlawful discharging of a firearm (4 counts)
- Penalty: Death

Details
- Victims: 8 killed; 19 injured
- Span of crimes: May 2005 – July 30, 2006
- Country: United States
- State: Arizona
- Date apprehended: August 3, 2006

Samuel John Dieteman and Dale Shawn Hausner were a duo of serial killers and arsonists who committed several drive-by shootings and arsons in Phoenix, Arizona, United States, between May 2005 and August 2006. They targeted random pedestrians and animals, mostly doing so while under the influence of methamphetamine, and also set multiple objects on fire. Investigators believe they were responsible for eight murders and at least 29 other shootings. The investigation of their crimes coincided with the search for the Baseline Killer, who was also committing random murders and sexual assaults in the Phoenix area.

After being found guilty of 80 of 88 felony charges in one single trial including murder, attempted murder, arson, animal cruelty and drive-by-shootings, Hausner was sentenced to death. He killed himself in prison in 2013. Dieteman was sentenced to life imprisonment without the possibility of parole. Hausner's brother Jeff had assisted in some of the shootings, and was himself sentenced to 25 years in prison.

== Crimes ==
In addition to several dozen non-fatal shootings of people and fatal shootings of animals, Hausner and Dieteman were found guilty of the following murders:

- David Estrada (20), shot to death on June 29, 2005, in Tolleson, Arizona.
- Nathaniel Shoffner, (44) murdered on November 11, 2005, while attempting to protect a dog from being shot.
- Jose Ortiz (44) and Marco Carillo (28), murdered on December 29, 2005.
- Claudia Gutierrez-Cruz (20), shot and killed by Dieteman on May 2, 2006, as Hausner drove in Scottsdale, Arizona.
- Robin Blasnek (22), the serial shooters' last victim, shot and killed on July 30, 2006, in Mesa, Arizona.

Though not included in the fatalities, injured survivor Paul Patrick was shot in his Maryvale neighborhood while attempting to go to the local supermarket to buy cigarettes on June 8, 2006. He would live for 12 years, before dying from causes attributed to his gunshot injuries on November 13, 2018.

Phoenix police originally believed that the serial shooter was a single individual responsible for four murders and 25 shootings beginning in May 2005, and that a series of 13 shootings in the same area were the work of another offender. However, on July 11, 2006, investigators revealed that they believed the two series of shootings were related. On August 3, Phoenix police released a statement linking Blasnek's murder to the serial shooters, citing forensic evidence and other similarities to the shooters' past crimes.

== Perpetrators ==
- Dale Shawn Hausner, 33, had worked as a custodian at Phoenix Sky Harbor International Airport since 1999 as well as a boxing photojournalist for RingSports and Fightnews.com.
- Samuel John Dieteman, 31, had a history of petty crimes such as shoplifting and drunk driving and had relocated to Arizona a few years prior from Minnesota.

== Capture ==
Hausner and Dieteman were initially identified as suspects on July 31, 2006. The most important tip came from Ron Horton, a friend of Dieteman, who said Dieteman had confessed to being involved with the shootings while drinking. Horton was at first uncertain whether Dieteman's confession was serious. Horton went to police after the shooting death of Robin Blasnek, which he said "affected me quite a bit" due to a belief Horton might have prevented her death had he contacted police earlier.

On August 3, 2006, police arrested both suspects outside of their apartment in Mesa. On the morning of August 4, 2006, Phoenix police announced that two arrests had been made in connection with the serial shootings. Authorities also linked Hausner and Dieteman to two arson fires at Wal-Mart stores on June 8 in Glendale, Arizona, started 45 minutes apart from each other, that caused approximately $7 to $10 million in damages.

A few weeks prior to his capture, Hausner interviewed former Heavyweight boxing champion Mike Tyson as part of his sports journalism job. Police questioned Tyson regarding his brief meeting with Hausner, and the boxer later described Hausner as "...a small guy, but a nice guy."

== Trial ==
Hausner was charged with 88 crimes in five different indictments attributed to the serial shooter investigation, including 8 murders, 18 attempted murders, 17 aggravated assaults, 26 drive-by shootings, four firearms charges, 10 animal cruelty charges and two arson of an occupied structure charges. Hausner was convicted on 6 of 8 murders, and 80 charges overall on March 13, 2009.

Hausner's former roommate, Samuel Dieteman, pleaded guilty to two murders, plus conspiracy to commit several others. In July 2009, Dieteman received a sentence of life without parole.

On March 27, 2009, Hausner was sentenced to six death sentences. Hausner had instructed his attorneys not to oppose a death sentence, saying his execution would help the victims' families heal. After a mandatory appeal, Hausner waived further appeals and requested to be put to death "as soon as possible." During Hausner's half-hour statement to the jury before sentencing, he apologized to several people, including his family, and compared himself to Charles Manson.

On June 19, 2013, Hausner was found unresponsive in his cell and died later that day. His autopsy revealed no physical trauma. The medical examiner determined that he had killed himself by overdosing on an anti-depressant.

== Suspected victims ==
Although Hausner was convicted of murdering six people, he is suspected to have killed two more people in 2005:

Tony Mendez (39), shot to death on May 17, 2005.

Reginald Remillard (56), was shot to death on May 24, 2005.

== See also ==
- List of serial killers in the United States
- 2015 Phoenix freeway shootings, a series of shootings along Interstate 10 in Phoenix
