= Mark Goudeau =

American serial killer and rapist on death row

- Goudeau's 2006 mug shot
- Born: September 6, 1964 (age 62); Phoenix, Arizona, U.S.
- Status: Currently on death row, awaiting execution
- Other names: The Baseline Killer; The Baseline Rapist
- Convictions: First degree murder (9 counts); Attempted first degree murder; Kidnapping (13 counts); Attempted kidnapping; Sexual assault (23 counts); Attempted sexual assault (7 counts); Sexual abuse (6 counts); Aggravated assault (14 counts); Armed robbery (12 counts); Attempted armed robbery (2 counts); First degree burglary
- Penalty: Death x9 + 1,762 years and 3 months

Details
- Victims: 9 killed
- Span of crimes: August 6, 2005 – June 29, 2006
- Country: United States
- State: Arizona
- Date apprehended: September 4, 2006
- Imprisoned at: Arizona State Prison Complex – Eyman

Mark Goudeau (born September 6, 1964), also called the Baseline Killer and the Baseline Rapist, is an American serial killer and kidnapper who committed the rape, robbery, and murder of nine victims in the Phoenix metro area between August 2005 and June 2006. In addition, his extensive crime spree included 77 other felony crimes, totaling 86 felonies over the ten-month period. The term "Baseline Killer" was adopted since most, but not all, of his victims were found along Baseline Road.

Goudeau was active at the same time as two other Phoenix serial killers, jointly known as the "Serial Shooters." Goudeau faced two separate trials—one for 19 charges related to an attack on two sisters whom he raped and sexually assaulted, and another related to 58 more charges including murder, robbery, rape, kidnapping, sexual abuse and/or assault of minors and adults. All but one of his victims were female. Goudeau was convicted on a total of 76 of 93 crimes, and was sentenced to death 9 times (one for each murder conviction) and given a sum total of 1,762 years and 3 months in Arizona state prison.

== Background ==
Goudeau was first referred to as the Baseline Rapist when Phoenix Police announced that a light-skinned black male was sexually assaulting females as young as 12 years old at gunpoint near Baseline Road. Goudeau would later be dubbed the Baseline Killer in the spring of 2006 after investigators linked him to a series of murders and armed robberies. The crimes later spread north, primarily in the North Central area of Phoenix, Arizona.

Goudeau is believed to have committed nine counts of first degree murder (the victims were eight women and one man), in addition to 15 sexual assaults on women and young girls, 11 counts of kidnapping, and a number of armed robberies. Although not initially linked, the crimes were distinguished by having no apparent motive, and the murders were particularly brutal, with the killer often shooting the victims in the head. The criminal was often described wearing various disguises such as a Halloween mask as well as attempting to impersonate a homeless man or drug addict.

Police say that the shell casings found at each of the crime scenes all came from the same gun. Phoenix police spent thousands of hours patrolling and following up on hundreds of tips during the summer of 2006. As residents of Phoenix became increasingly alarmed by the random nature of the violent crimes, community meetings were called by the police to distribute a sketch based on the description given by the surviving victims. Frustration and fear blanketed the city as posters and billboards displayed the sketch of the Baseline Killer, offering a $100,000 reward for information leading to an arrest. It took the police over a year to finally come up with a viable suspect.

Mark Goudeau was at the time on community supervision (parole) with the Arizona Department of Corrections and supervised out of the Northeast Parole Office. In August 2006, parole officers in the Northeast Parole Office provided information to the Phoenix Police Department task force suggesting that Goudeau matched the sketch of the Baseline Killer. Parole officers searched Goudeau's residence and found a ski mask and a realistic "toy" handgun. Police used this information to obtain a search warrant for Goudeau's residence and found additional items that linked him to crimes committed by the Baseline Killer.

On September 4, 2006, Mark Goudeau was arrested in connection to the sexual assault of two Phoenix sisters, an attack which was tied to the Baseline Killer investigation. The sisters, one of whom was visibly pregnant, were assaulted in a Phoenix city park on September 20, 2005. Goudeau was linked to the attack by DNA evidence collected shortly following the time of the crime. On September 7, 2007, Goudeau was tried and convicted of all 19 charges relating to the attack on the two sisters. He was sentenced on December 14, 2007, to 438 years in prison for the sexual assault charges. On November 30, 2011, a Phoenix jury sentenced him to death on the murder charges relating to the Baseline Killings. Goudeau is held on death row in ASPC Florence, awaiting execution.

== Timeline ==
- August 6, 2005, two sexual assaults
  - 9:45 pm, 7202 S. 48th Street, Phoenix. Police say Goudeau forced three teenagers behind a church near Baseline Road, and molested two of the girls.
- August 14, 2005, combined sexual assault and robbery
  - 4:10 am, 2425 E. Thomas Rd, Phoenix.
- September 8, 2005, homicide
  - 1:00 am, 3730 S. Mill Ave, Tempe, Georgia Thompson, 19.
- September 15, 2005, sexual assault
  - 9:40 am, 4512 N. 40th St, Phoenix.
- September 20, 2005, sexual assault
  - 10:30 pm, 3100 W. Vineyard Rd, Phoenix. While walking home from a Phoenix city park at night, two sisters (one of whom was clearly pregnant), were approached by Goudeau who was armed with a gun. He sexually assaulted one of the sisters while pushing the gun into the other sister's pregnant belly. He was arrested, one year later, when DNA evidence found on the women matched his profile. This was the breakthrough that led to the arrest in the Baseline Killer investigation.
- September 28, 2005, robbery
  - 1425 W. Baseline Rd, Tempe.
- September 28, 2005, combined sexual assault and robbery
  - 9:30 pm, 7202 S. Central Ave, Phoenix.
- November 3, 2005, robbery and sexual assault
  - separate robbery at 8:01 pm, 4019 N. 32nd St, Phoenix, then sexual assault at 8:10 pm, 3131 E. Indian School (across the street from the robbery), Phoenix. A robbery occurred on North 32nd Street. A man with dreadlocks and a fisherman's hat walked into a shop and robbed it at gunpoint for $720. Less than 10 minutes later, he abducted a woman placing items in a parking lot donation receptacle, across the street. He sexually assaulted her in her car and demanded she drive him to the corner because he just committed a robbery. The victim said he wore a Halloween costume and black plastic glasses.
- November 7, 2005, three separate robberies
  - 8:08 pm, 2950 N. 32nd St, Phoenix. A string of robberies occurred starting with four people at gunpoint inside Las Brasas, a Mexican restaurant. He then went next door to a Little Caesar's Pizza restaurant and robbed three people inside. Immediately before entering the pizza restaurant, he robbed four people outside on the street. He reportedly stole $463 and fired a round into the air as he fled.
- December 12, 2005, homicide
  - at 6:55 pm there was a homicide on 6005 S. 40th Street, Phoenix. Tina Washington, 39, was on her way home from a preschool where she worked. A witness spotted a man with a drawn gun standing over her body behind a fast food restaurant. She had been shot in the head.
- December 13, 2005, robbery
  - 4:00 pm, a woman was robbed at 700 E. South Mountain Avenue, Phoenix.
- February 20, 2006, two homicides
  - 7:38 am, the bodies of 38-year-old Romelia Vargas and 34-year-old Mirna Palma-Roman were found shot to death inside their snack truck at 91st Avenue and Lower Buckeye Road. Initially, police did not connect this crime to the Baseline Killer and believed that the murders were drug-related. The murders were officially linked by police in July 2006.
- March 15, 2006, two homicides
  - at 9:00 pm, a double homicide was discovered on 4102 N. 24th Street, Phoenix. Two employees of Yoshi's restaurant at 24th Street and Indian School Road were on their way home in the same vehicle. Liliana Sanchez-Cabrera, age 20, was found dead in the parking lot of another fast-food restaurant while the body of Chao Chou was discovered about a mile away. Both victims were shot in the head.
- March 29, 2006, homicide
  - 12:00 am, 2502 N. 24th St, Phoenix. A body was discovered on North 24th Street. A local businessman noticed streaks of blood on the gravel of a parking lot. The police were called, but a search of the area turned up nothing of real value. A week later, the businessman discovered the badly decomposed body of Kristin Nicole Gibbons as he was investigating a horrible odor in the area. She had been shot in the head.
- May 1, 2006, sexual assault
  - at 9:00 pm, 2950 N. 32nd St, Phoenix. A man in a latex Halloween mask abducted a woman in a car and sexually assaulted her at gunpoint. She was taken from outside the same restaurants where the November 7, 2005 crimes occurred.
- May 5, 2006
  - Phoenix police went public with a list of 18 crimes that they believed were the work of the Baseline Killer. This number has since risen to 23, as of August 2, 2006.
- June 29, 2006, homicide
  - at 9:30 pm, a homicide occurred on 2924 E. Thomas Rd, Phoenix. Carmen Miranda, 37, was abducted from a self-serve carwash, located half a block from May 1 and November 7 crimes, while she was on her cellular phone. She was found dead from a gunshot to the head behind a barbershop about 100 yards (91 m) away. The attack was captured on closed-circuit television. This is the last crime attributed to the Baseline Killer.

== Investigation ==
=== Documents release ===
Phoenix police released hundreds of pages of documents that detailed their investigation into the Baseline Killer. The paperwork obtained by ABC15 News revealed that police had at least 10 names of possible suspects that they had looked into, and that they had already ruled out some of those people. The 20,000 pages of police reports were primarily of other suspects with very little mention of Mark Goudeau. The documents revealed information on nine cases ranging from a double homicide to sexual assaults, robberies and kidnappings. The new information included police reports and narratives that described where and who police were looking at in the investigation. They also discussed investigative leads; however, much of the information was redacted.

According to the documents, the Baseline Killer posed as a homeless person in one incident, pushing a shopping cart toward a woman in a parking lot near 32nd Street and Thomas Road. He forced himself into her car and told her to perform oral sex upon him or he would kill her. She fought him off, the records said. In that incident, the man believed to be the Baseline Killer was wearing gloves, a mask and clothing that covered his entire body. The records show police worked to obtain partial hand prints, DNA and ballistics reports to build their case; but those results were redacted/blacked out on the paperwork.

=== False confession ===
While being interviewed by police in Kentucky on a burglary case, James Dewayne Mullins claimed responsibility for the murder of Georgia Thompson on September 8, 2005. Mullins told police he shot Thompson as she attempted to rob him outside the Scottsdale strip club where she worked. However, Thompson's body was found almost 10 miles (16 km) away in Tempe at her apartment complex. Police do not believe she was killed elsewhere.

Mullins changed his story when police definitively linked the homicide to the Baseline Killer. He told police that he was not in Arizona. Mullins denies any involvement in Thompson's death. On August 3, 2006, murder charges against Mullins were dropped. Authorities stated that Mullins had caused a significant diversion of resources during the hunt for the genuine killer.

=== Mishandling of evidence ===
In April 2009, the Times Publications, a chain of publications in the Phoenix metro area, published a story revealing that the Phoenix Police Department had possessed the key DNA evidence that was eventually used to crack the Baseline Killer case nine months before the arrest, but failed to analyze it in a timely manner.

== Suspects ==
=== Arrest of Goudeau as a suspect ===
On September 4, 2006, Phoenix police announced an arrest in connection with a sexual assault previously linked to the Baseline Killer while serving a search warrant at 28th Street and Pinchot Avenue.

Police arrested Mark Goudeau, a construction worker living in Phoenix. Goudeau was charged with attacking two sisters on September 20, 2005, while they were walking home from a Phoenix city park at night. Goudeau was linked to the attack by matching DNA evidence found on the victims. Goudeau was tried and convicted on all 19 counts connected to the assault and all murders related to the Baseline Killer investigation.

During the trial, the two sisters gave testimony that Goudeau suddenly approached them with a gun in his hand. They were forced into nearby bushes and told to remove their clothing. The victims said Goudeau sexually assaulted the younger sister as he pointed his gun at the other sister's pregnant abdomen. Prosecutors said Goudeau warned the women not to look at his face during the assault. They also stated he rubbed dirt on one of the women to remove saliva traces, and wore a condom during the assault on one of the sisters.

Maricopa County Attorney Andrew Thomas stated he would seek the death penalty on Goudeau if he were convicted in the murder trial.

Goudeau's wife, Wendy Carr, told The Associated Press that police arrested the wrong man; "My husband is innocent," Carr reportedly said in a telephone interview. "This is a huge miscarriage of justice. And they have an innocent man in prison. This is all a mistake. He shouldn't be in prison for something he didn't do." Goudeau was described as a loving husband and exceptionally friendly neighbor who took meticulous care of his lawn. Friends and family deny any possibility that Goudeau could be the Baseline Killer, saying he was framed by Phoenix police who were desperate for a suspect.

According to Arizona prison officials, Goudeau is an ex-convict who served 13 years of a 21-year sentence for aggravated assault, including beating a woman's head with a barbell, and armed robbery. Goudeau pleaded down to the charge of aggravated assault, but he had also originally been charged with rape and kidnapping. The rape charge was dropped, as there was no physical evidence of rape.

On December 7, 2006, three months after Goudeau was arrested, Phoenix police said they were confident he was responsible for the full series of murders, rapes and robberies that terrorized the city for 13 months. Goudeau is believed to have committed nine murders, one more than originally attributed to the Baseline Killer (the murder of Sophia Nunez on April 10, 2006). Police say ballistics, DNA and circumstantial evidence prove that Goudeau is the Baseline Killer. During the trial, a forensic specialist with the Department of Public Safety told the Maricopa County Superior Court that Goudeau was undoubtedly the source of male DNA found on the left breast of one of the victims with it being 360 trillion times more likely that DNA collected from the crime scene came from Goudeau rather than an unrelated black male.

Corwin Townsend, Goudeau's defense attorney at the time, pointed out that Heath's analysis showed only a partial match. Under cross-examination, Heath agreed that Goudeau's DNA was consistent with only three of 13 genetic markers.

Police recommended that prosecutors charge Goudeau with 74 crimes, including nine counts of first-degree murder, five counts of sexual assault, three counts of attempted sexual assault, 10 counts of kidnapping, 11 counts of armed robbery, four counts of attempted armed robbery, three counts of sexual abuse, nine counts of sexual conduct with a minor, 13 counts of aggravated assault, and three counts of indecent exposure. On October 31, 2011, Mark Goudeau was found guilty of a total of 67 felony counts, including all murders attributed to the Baseline Killer. On November 30, 2011, Goudeau was sentenced to death 9 times for the murders and 1,324 years for the other 58 crimes he was convicted for- while serving a 438-year sentence after being convicted for 19 separate crimes related to the rape and assault of two sisters during this same crime spree. This sentence totals 1,762 years.

In October 2015, Goudeau appealed his nine death sentences, with an appellate attorney arguing to the Arizona Supreme Court that Goudeau should have been tried separately for each of the murders and some other counts. In June 2016, The Arizona Supreme Court upheld nine death sentences and more than 60 other felony convictions against Mark Goudeau.

=== Second suspect ===
In June 2009, a leaked police report indicated another suspect had been questioned in connection to the Vargas and Roman lunch truck murder in February 2006. Terry Wayne Smith, a black male who matched the description of the Baseline Killer and who lived near several of the Baseline Killer crime scenes was documented as a potential accomplice. Smith had a long, violent history of crime in California and Arizona including aggravated assault, armed robbery, and was a suspect in two homicide cases.

Smith was released from prison shortly before the Baseline Killer attacks began, and he was arrested a few days after Goudeau. Smith is currently imprisoned for four years after allegedly holding his family at gunpoint the night before his arrest.

Police officer Rusty Stuart compiled 166 pages suggesting that Smith may have been involved in some of the Baseline murders. However, police spokesmen say that Smith had been properly questioned and dismissed as a suspect, and state that Smith was in jail at the time of one of the murders.

== See also ==
- List of serial killers in the United States
