= William Augustus Hancock =

American pioneer, surveyor, engineer, politician, and jurist (1831–1902)

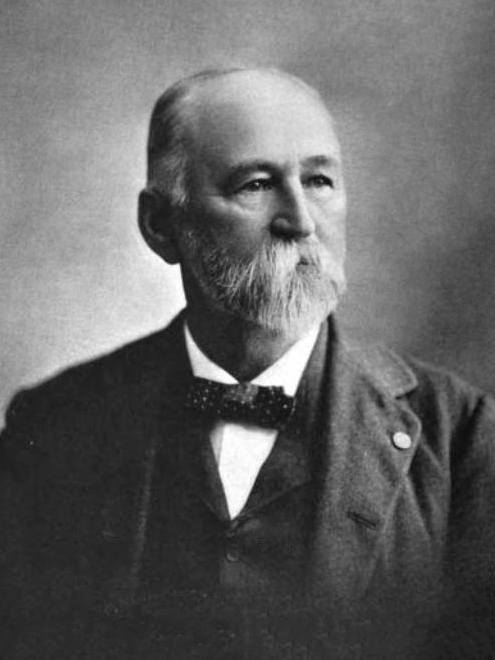
- Born: May 17, 1831; Barre, Massachusetts, US
- Died: March 24, 1902 (aged 70); Phoenix, Arizona, US
- Burial place: Phoenix's Pioneer and Military Memorial Park
- Education: Leicester Academy
- Occupations: Attorney, politician
- Military career
- Branch: Union Army
- American Civil War: 1864–1866
- Rank: second lieutenant
- Unit: 7th Regiment California Volunteer Infantry

William Augustus Hancock (May 17, 1831 – March 24, 1902) was an American pioneer, attorney, and politician. Arriving in Arizona Territory during the American Civil War, he settled in the Salt River Valley. There he performed the survey work required to create the town of Phoenix as well as holding a variety of governmental offices at the city and county levels.

== Biography ==
Hancock was born in Barre, Massachusetts, on May 17, 1831, into a family of New England farmers. He was educated in local schools and at Leicester Academy. In 1853, Hancock joined with two of his brothers and purchased some livestock in Iowa and then drove their herd to California. Upon his arrival, Hancock engaged in ranching and mining in Sacramento County Following an 1857 visit to his hometown, Hancock returned to California with a Thoroughbred stallion and several other horses.

In 1864, during the American Civil War, Hancock enlisted in Company K of the 7th Regiment California Volunteer Infantry. His unit was assigned to Fort Yuma in February 1865. There Hancock was reassigned to the 1st Arizona Volunteers and commissioned a second lieutenant. From Fort Yuma, he was transferred to Fort McDowell, Arizona, and placed in charge of a unit of Pima Indians fighting in the Apache Wars. Hancock left the military in September 1866 as a first lieutenant and, following the traditions of the day, became known as "Captain" Hancock.

After leaving the military, Hancock operated a trading post near his former post. In May 1870, he moved to the Salt River Valley. There, on November 10, 1870, he was hired by the Salt River Valley Town Association to survey and plat a townsite for the foundation of Phoenix. By December 10, Hancock had completed enough surveying work to allow for initial sale of plots on the eastern side of the new town. The next year Hancock built Phoenix's first adobe home. It is unclear as to whether the structure was the first building in Phoenix or only the first building constructed after the townsite was selected. In addition to being Hancock's home, the building also served as a general store, butcher shop, town hall, county office and general meeting place.

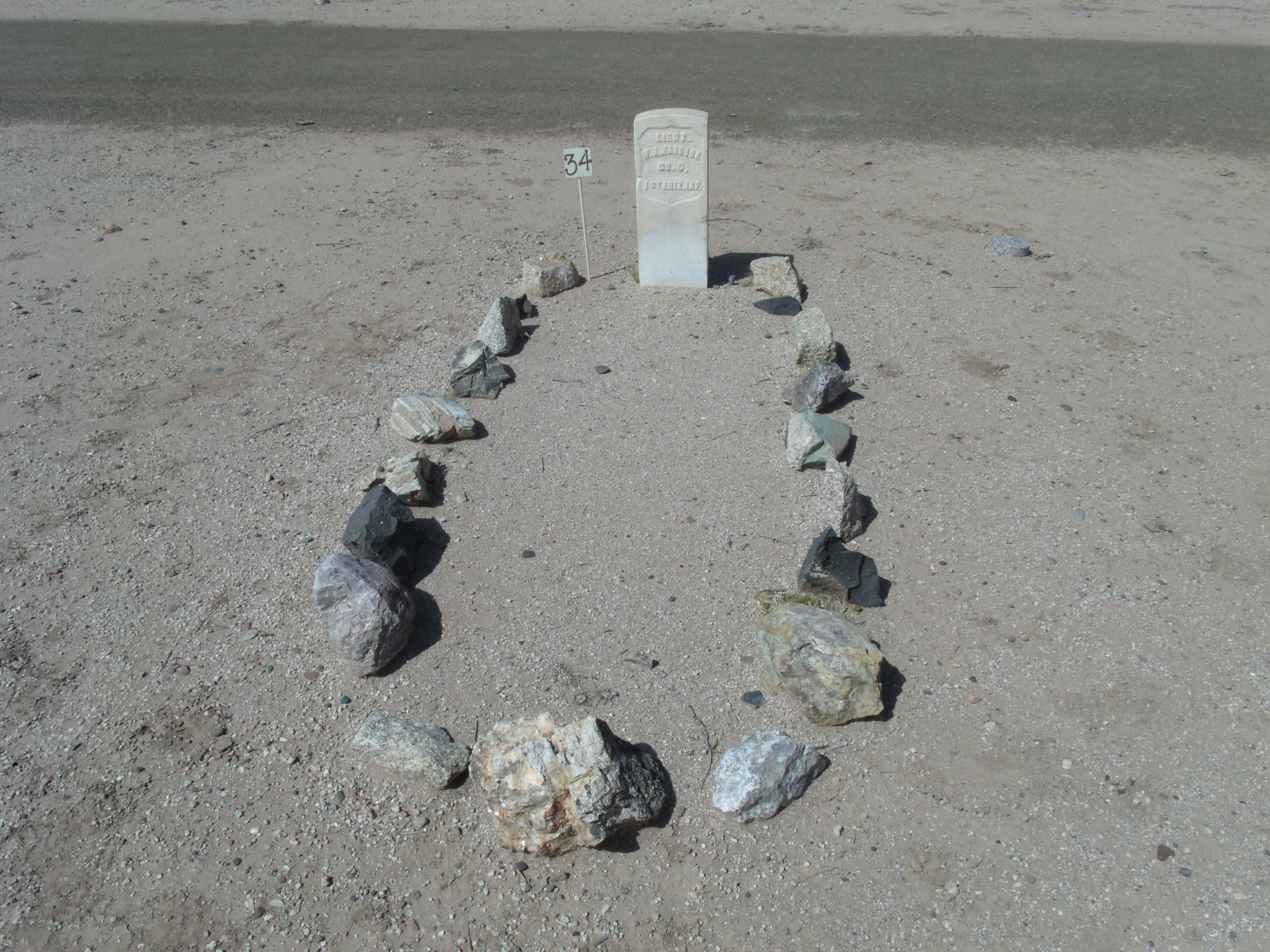
Grave site of William Augustus Hancock

Hancock continued to perform survey and civil engineering work in the Salt River Valley for several years. Before he was done he had completed the initial town site and several irrigation canals and drainage ditches. To this he added several other jobs. Hancock became Phoenix's postmaster in 1871, a position he held for eight years. He was appointed sheriff for Maricopa County when the county was formed. About the same time he was appointed to a four-year term as district attorney. When he was appointed probate judge he became the ex officio superintendent of the county school board. For several years he was a partner of Charles Austin Tweed in a law firm which they established. He continued to practice after the death of his partner. In 1886, Hancock won election to another term as county attorney.

When the Maricopa and Phoenix Railroad reached Phoenix in 1887, Hancock drove the final spike in the new rail line. He was also active in several irrigation projects. In 1900, Hancock proposed a company that would build flood control dams and provide irrigation water to 275,000 acres (1,110 km^{2}) of land in the Salt River valley. The proposal would eventually result in the creation of the Salt River Valley Water Users' Association His final years were additionally spent representing another dam project on the Agua Fria River.

Hancock died in Phoenix from nephritis on March 24, 1902, and was buried in Phoenix's Pioneer and Military Memorial Park. He was widely respected and mourned at the time of his death. Hancock Butte, near the north rim of the Grand Canyon, is named in his memory.

== See also ==
- History of Phoenix, Arizona
- Pioneer and Military Memorial Park
