= Hancock Butte (Arizona) =

Landform in the Grand Canyon, Arizona

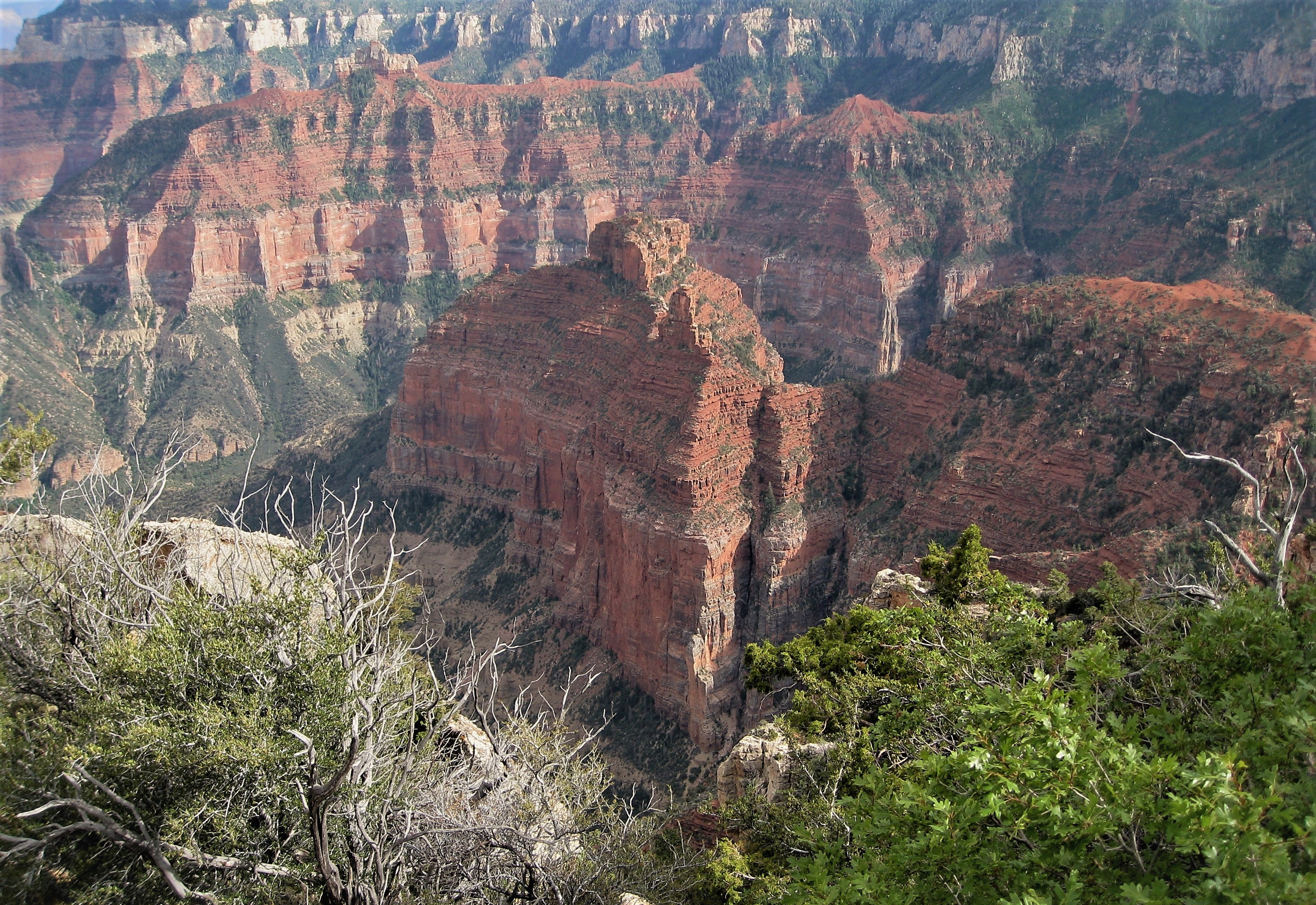
- North aspect centered, from Point Imperial

Highest point
- Elevation: 7,683 ft (2,342 m)
- Prominence: 463 ft (141 m)
- Parent peak: Mount Hayden (8,362 ft)
- Isolation: 0.81 mi (1.30 km)
- Coordinates: 36°15′42″N 111°58′29″W

Naming
- Etymology: William A. Hancock

Geography
- Location within Arizona Location within the United States
- Country: United States
- State: Arizona
- County: Coconino
- Protected area: Grand Canyon National Park
- Parent range: Kaibab Plateau; Colorado Plateau
- Topo map: USGS Point Imperial

Geology
- Rock age: Permian

Climbing
- First ascent: Alan Doty, October 1976
- Easiest route: class 5.1 climbing

Hancock Butte is a 7,683-foot-elevation (2,342-meter) summit located in the Grand Canyon, in Coconino County of northern Arizona, US. It is situated one mile south of the Point Imperial viewpoint on the canyon's North Rim, where it towers 3,700 feet (1,100 meters) above Nankoweap Canyon. Its nearest higher neighbor is Mount Hayden, one mile to the north-northeast, Kibbey Butte is one mile to the south-southwest, and Brady Peak is 1.5 mile to the southeast. Hancock Butte is named after William A. Hancock (1831–1902), a pioneer and politician of the Arizona Territory known for performing the survey work required to create the town of Phoenix and erecting the first building there in 1870. This geographical feature's name was officially adopted in 1932 by the U.S. Board on Geographic Names. According to the Köppen climate classification system, Hancock Butte is located in a Cold semi-arid climate zone.

== Geology ==
Hancock Butte is a butte topped by Esplanade Sandstone, part of the Pennsylvanian-Permian Supai Group overlaying the cliff-forming Mississippian Redwall Limestone. Precipitation runoff from this feature drains east into the Colorado River via Nankoweap Creek.

== Gallery ==
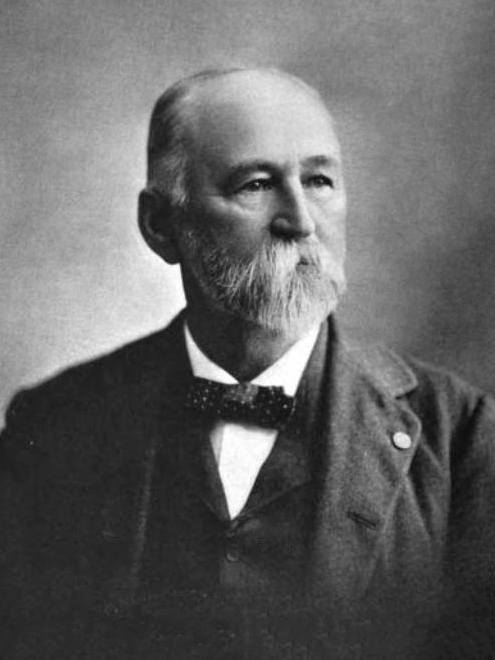
William Augustus Hancock

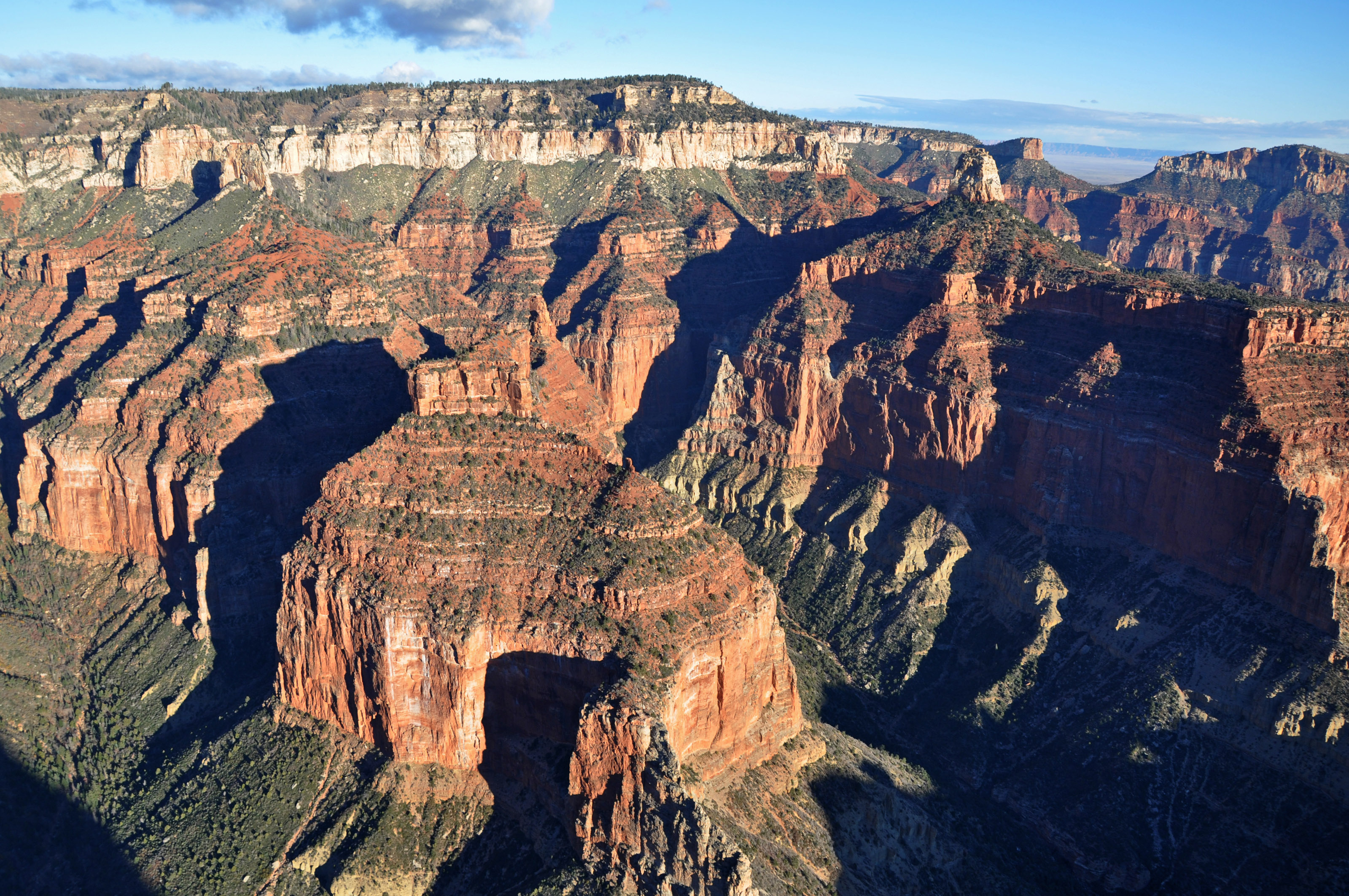
Aerial view with south aspect front and center, Mt. Hayden to right, Point Imperial centered at top

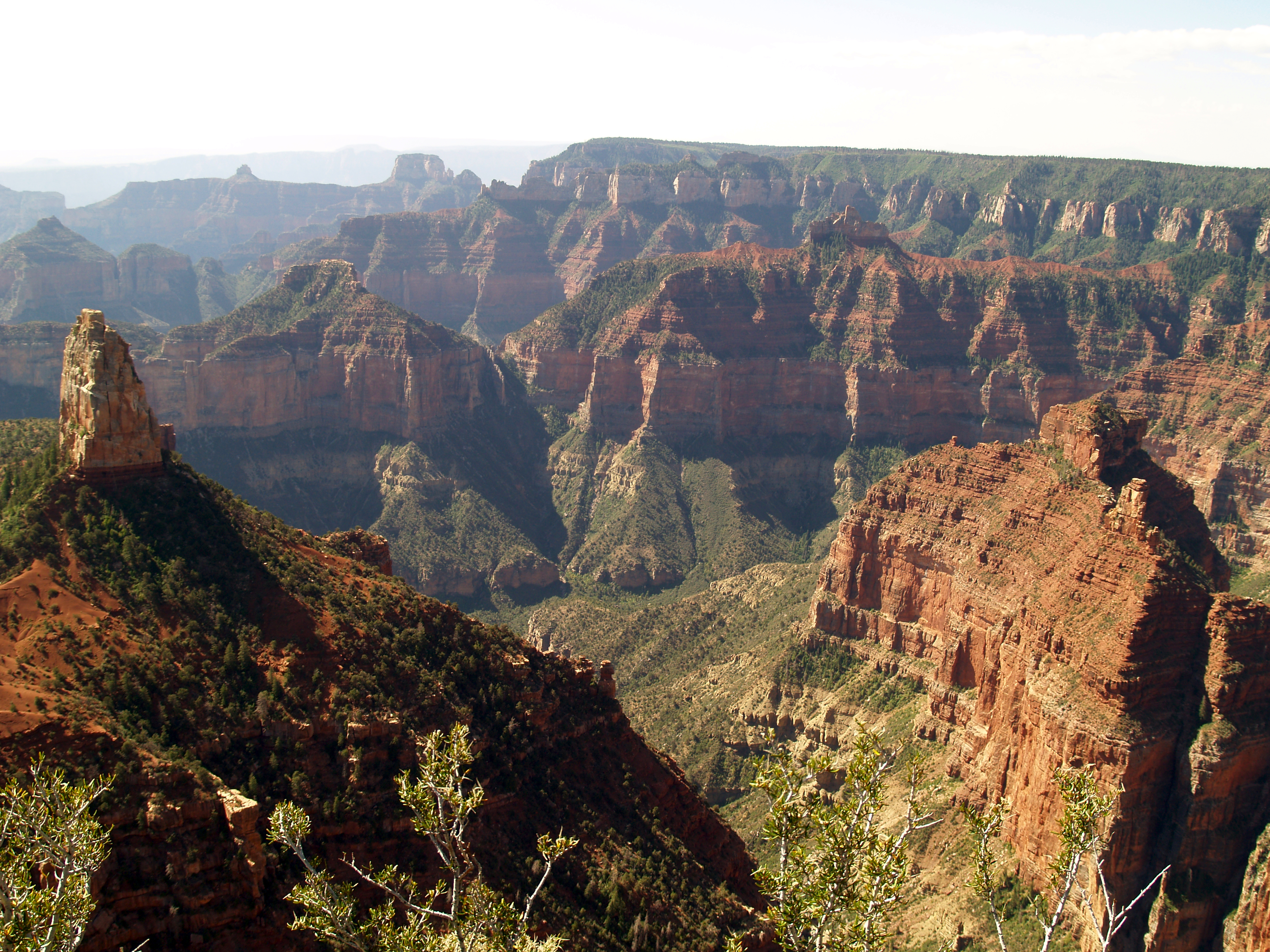
Mt. Hayden to left, Hancock Butte lower right

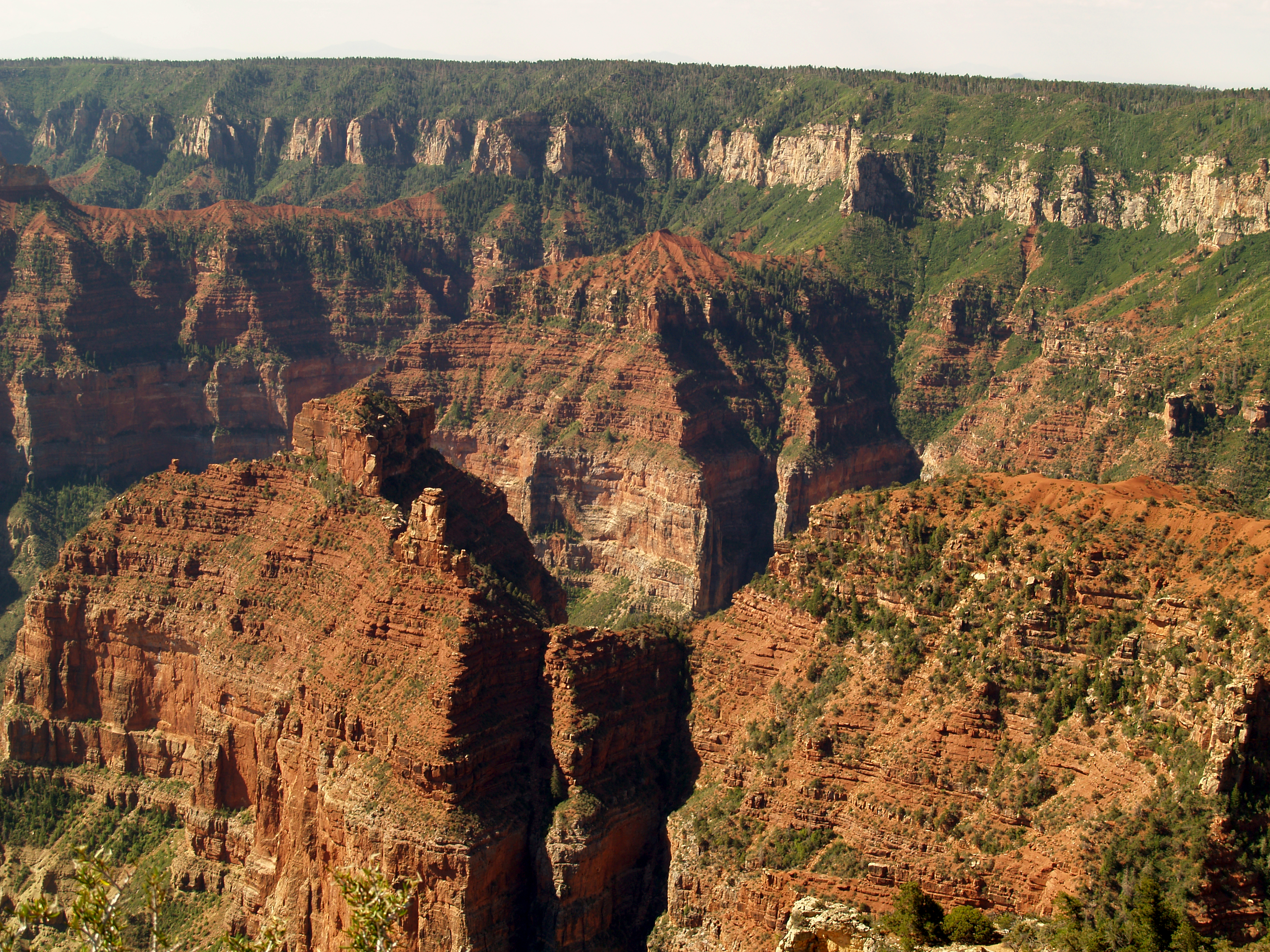
Hancock Butte lower left

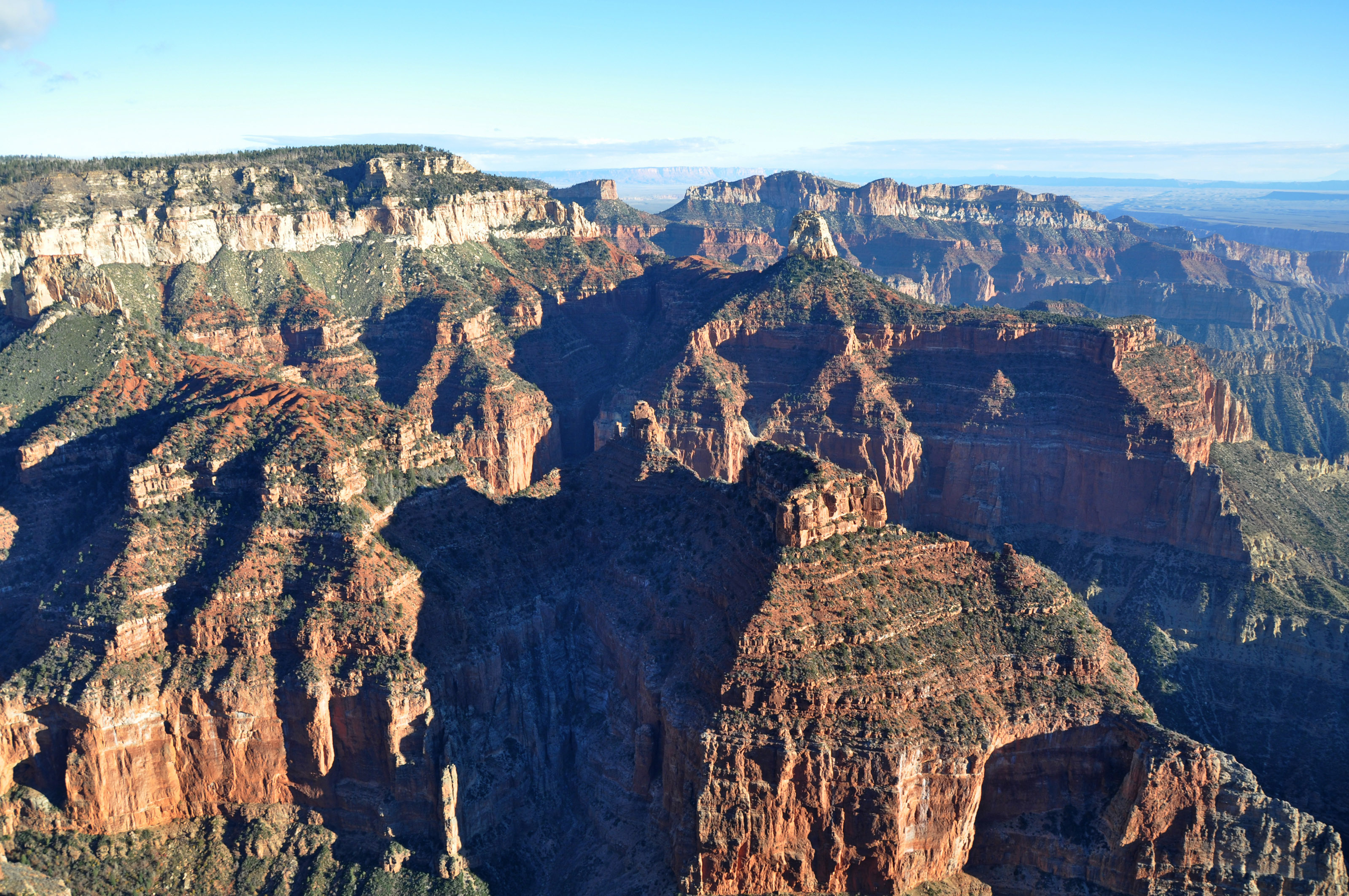
Aerial view of Hancock Butte with Mt. Hayden behind it.

== See also ==
- Geology of the Grand Canyon area
