= Pioneer and Military Memorial Park =

United States historic place in Phoenix, Arizona

- U.S. National Register of Historic Places
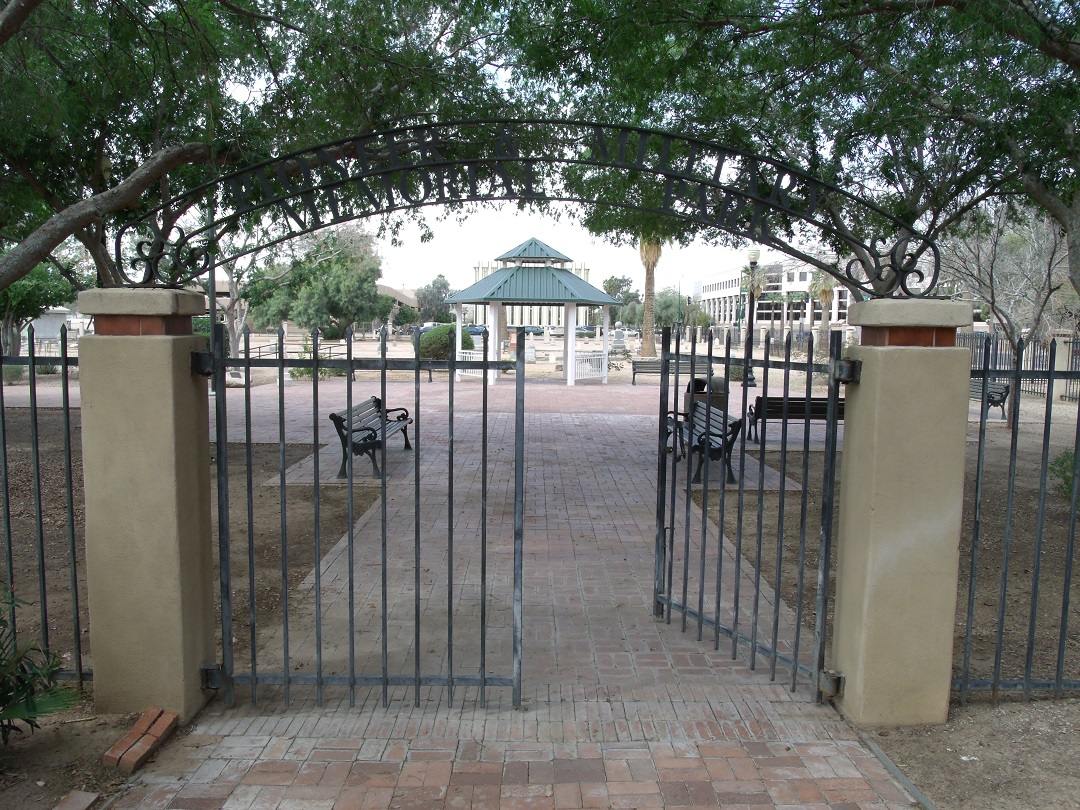
- Main entrance of the Pioneer and Military Memorial Park

- Location within Arizona Location within the United States
- Location: 1317 W. Jefferson Street Phoenix, Arizona
- Coordinates: 33°26′47″N 112°5′25″W
- Built: 1884
- Website: Pioneers' Cemetery Association
- NRHP reference No.: 06001317
- Added to NRHP: February 1, 2007

Pioneer and Military Memorial Park in Phoenix, Arizona is the official name of a group of nine historic cemeteries that were established between 1884 and 1898 and closed in 1914. The 11.6-acre park is located between 15th and 13th Aves. from W. Jefferson St. south to W. Harrison St. Both the park and the Victorian era Smurthwaite House on site are listed on the National Register of Historic Places. Pioneer Military and Memorial Park is the final resting place of various notable pioneers of Arizona.

== History ==
The earliest European-style cemetery in Phoenix was in the original townsite established in 1870. Although no provision for a cemetery was made on the townsite plat, four blocks in the southwest corner soon came to be used for the residents’ burial needs. The lack of planning and maintenance resulted in a burial ground described as “a disgrace to a city the size and enterprise of Phoenix.” After completion of the Southern Pacific Railroad to Maricopa, Arizona in 1879, the appearance of the cemetery fueled residents’ concerns about Phoenix’s image and reputation. The problem was that the main stage road from the railroad depot in Maricopa ran past the unkempt burial grounds. Arriving visitors and residents were greeted by an unflattering first view of the young town in the desert.

Phoenix’s “cemetery issue” was addressed by Mayor DeForest Porter in 1884. He knew that three fraternal organizations were setting up cemeteries in Block 32 of Neahr’s Addition, a half mile west of the recently incorporated city of Phoenix between Madison and Harrison Streets. The groups had extra land for sale which Porter felt would be ideal for the city to buy and use as a cemetery.

The first seven cemeteries at the park were opened in 1884 and early 1885 in the east half of Block 32. The fraternal organizations who started the cemeteries in June 1884 were the Free and Accepted Masons, the Independent Order of Odd Fellows, and the Knights of Pythias.^{6} Nine months later, the Ancient Order of United Workmen purchased lots from the Knights of Pythias creating the fourth cemetery in Block 32.

In October 1884, the city followed the mayor’s advice and purchased the southern third of the west half of the block for their municipal cemetery. John Loosley, a city councilman and local saloon keeper, bought the upper two-thirds for a public cemetery on the same day. Two months later, he sold a small portion to the County of Maricopa for their use as a potter’s field, the seventh and final cemetery in Block 32.

Once the new cemeteries were opened, the city began to remove graves from the original townsite cemetery but did not declare the area cleared until April 1888. De Forest Porter was again mayor, and it was his responsibility to determine the future uses for the old cemetery. He decided that one of the blocks would be appropriate for a school and the other three could help entice a railroad to build a line between Prescott and Phoenix and a depot on the old cemetery site. The school was built soon afterwards but it wasn’t until 1895 that the Santa Fe railroad satisfied the city’s terms and was given the remaining three city blocks.

The last two cemeteries at the park were located north of Block 32 between Madison and Jefferson Streets. Both had been designated as private family cemeteries by the city in the late 1880s before being converted to public use in the 1890s. Lulu Porter, widow of the former mayor, surveyed her parcel and opened a cemetery in 1891 known today as Porter Cemetery.

George Loring owned land west of Porter’s new cemetery. In 1898, he platted the area around his family burial vault as a cemetery and sold it to Hortense Peery, the 18-year-old cousin of Loring’s partner in the transaction. Today it is known as Rosedale Cemetery.

A combination of poor maintenance, absentee owners, and the departure of two fraternal groups contributed to the future Pioneer and Military Memorial Park becoming an eyesore after the turn of the century. In 1914, Phoenix’s ban on human burials within city limits shut down all nine cemeteries. The burial grounds were abandoned and neglected for over twenty years.

In 1938, the Pioneers’ Cemetery Association was formed to clean and repair the neglected cemeteries. The group accomplished several important improvements but lasted only until late 1940 when one of the principals passed away.

After another forty years of neglect, a second group of concerned residents created the second volunteer Pioneers’ Cemetery Association in the early 1980s. Since then, the new association has documented more than 3800 burials, conserved the 600 plus remaining monuments and conducted cemetery related research on a variety of topics. Pioneer and Military Memorial Park is managed by the Pioneers’ Cemetery Association in partnership with the Parks and Recreation Department of the City of Phoenix.

The Smurthwaite House

- Smurthwaite House
- U.S. National Register of Historic Places
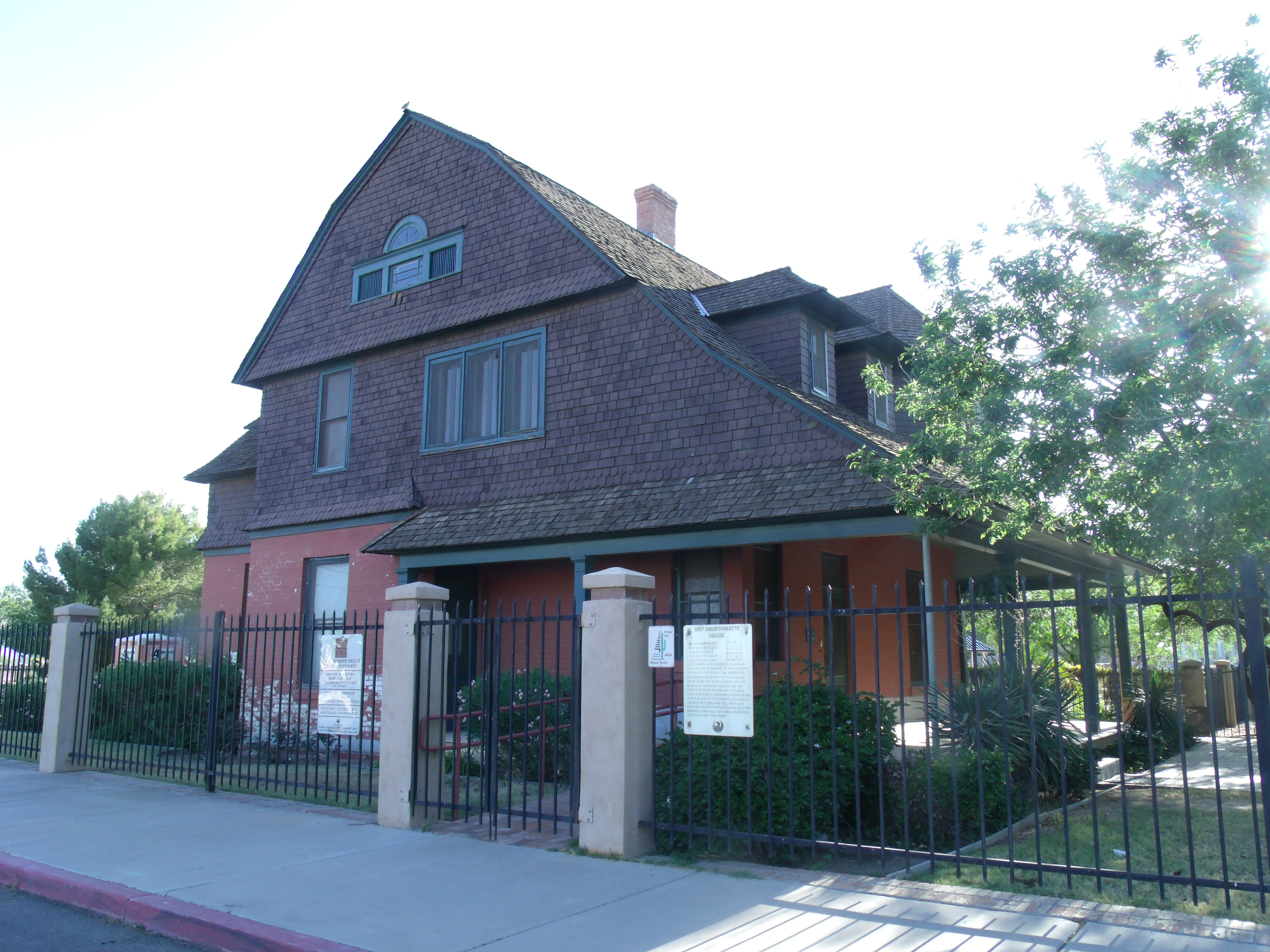
- The Smurthwaite House
- Location: Originally located at 602 N. 7th Street moved to 1317 W. Jefferson Street Phoenix, Arizona
- Built: 1897
- Architect: Creighton & Millard
- Architectural style: Victorian
- NRHP reference No.: 01000479
- Added to NRHP: May 17, 2001

The Smurthwaite House was designed and built in 1897 by the local architectural firm of Millard & Creighton for Dr. and Mrs. Darius Purman. The couple built the house on the lot next to their residence as a rental property, but the Dr.’s failing health and financial difficulties forced a bank sale in 1903. The buyers were Trustrim Connell, Civil War Medal of Honor recipient, and his wife Anne. The Connells and their descendants, daughter Caroline Smurthwaite and granddaughter Carolann, lived in the house until Carolann’s death in 1982. In her will Carolann requested the house be preserved and enjoyed by the public.

In 1991, a Heritage Fund grant of $50,000 enabled restoration and relocation of the Smurthwaite House to its current site at 1317 W. Jefferson St. in Pioneer and Military Memorial Park. It currently serves as the visitor center, office and research facility for the park.

The 1885 Bird’s Eye View of Phoenix by C. J. Dyer is on display in the main room of the Smurthwaite House. Dyer served as mayor pro tem of Phoenix on two occasions in 1899 and 1900. He is buried in the Rosedale Cemetery at Pioneer and Military Memorial Park.

== National Register of Historic Places ==
The Smurthwaite House was listed in the National Register of Historic Places on May 17, 2001, NRHP reference number 01000479. Historic Significance: Architecture/Engineering; Area of Significance: Architecture. The Pioneer Military and Memorial Park was designated as historical and listed in the National Register of Historic Places on February 1, 2007, NRHP reference number 06001317. According to the National Register, the "Periods of Significance" are from 1850 to 1924.

== Notable interments ==
Guided and self-tours are available at Pioneer and Military Park. Among the notable burials included in the tours are the following:

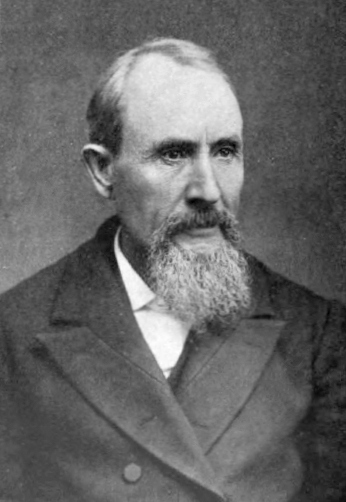
Judge John Taylor Alsap

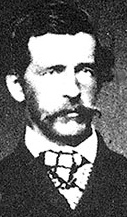
Phillip "Lord" Darrell Duppa

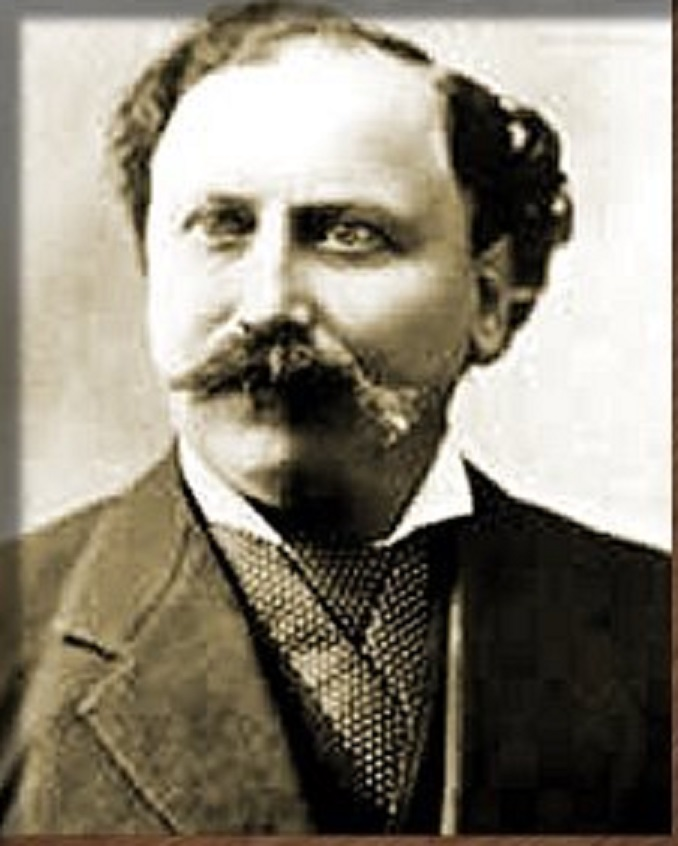
Henry Garfias

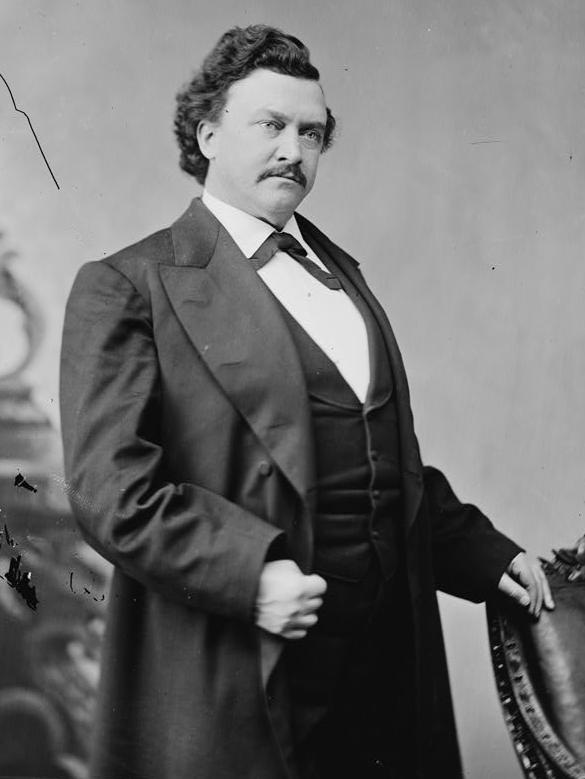
Benjamin Joseph Franklin

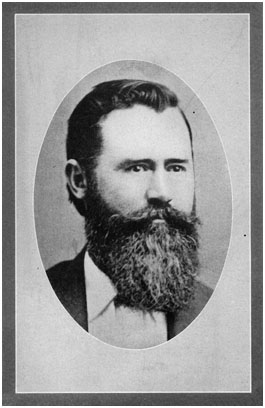
King S. Woolsey

Masons Cemetery
- Judge John Taylor Alsap – Alsap was the first Treasurer of the Arizona Territory. He also served as both Speaker of the House and President of the Council in the Arizona Territorial legislature. In 1881, he became the first Mayor of Phoenix. Alsap died September 10, 1886.
- Phillip "Lord" Darrell Duppa – Duppa was an Englishman who is credited with naming "Phoenix" and "Tempe". He is also the founder of the town of New River, Arizona. Duppa died on January 29, 1892.
City/Loosley Cemetery

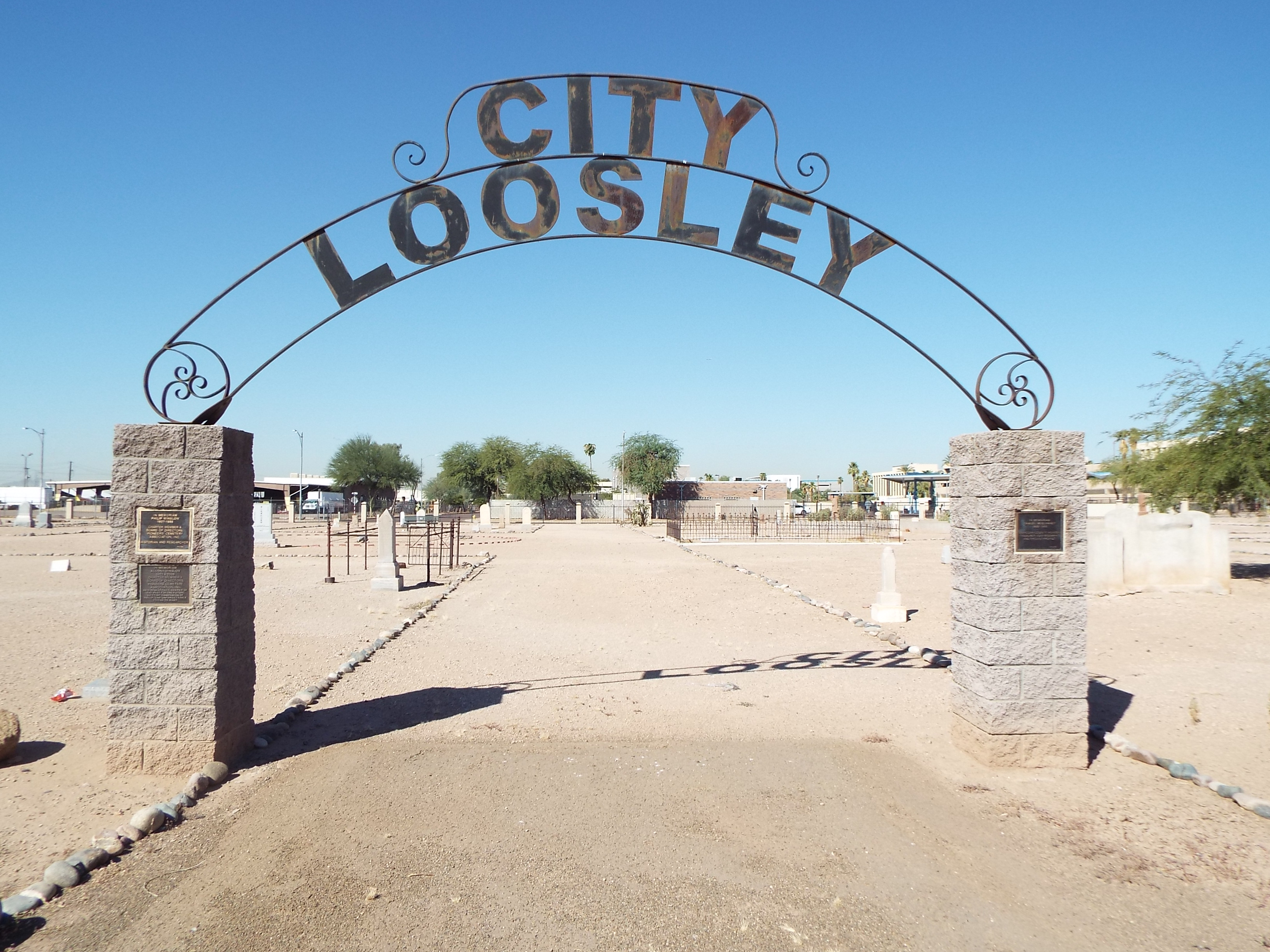
City/Loosley Cemetery entrance

- Henry Garfias – Garfias was a Hispanic who became the first marshal of Phoenix, Arizona. He was also a gunfighter who became the highest elected Mexican American official in the Valley during the 19th century.
- Jacob "Dutchman" Waltz – Waltz was a German immigrant who in the 19th century discovered a gold mine in Arizona and kept its location a secret, hence the name "Lost Dutchman's Mine". The Lost Dutchman Mine is supposedly located in the Superstition Mountains east of Phoenix. Waltz died an itinerant poor farmer on October 25, 1891, at age 81. According to the accounts of the day "A flood came through, he hung onto a tree, he caught pneumonia".
- King S. Woosley – Woosley founded one of the first flour mills in the Salt River Valley. He served in various positions in the territorial legislature and opened the first ice skating rink in Phoenix. Woosley died on June 30, 1879.
Rosedale Cemetery

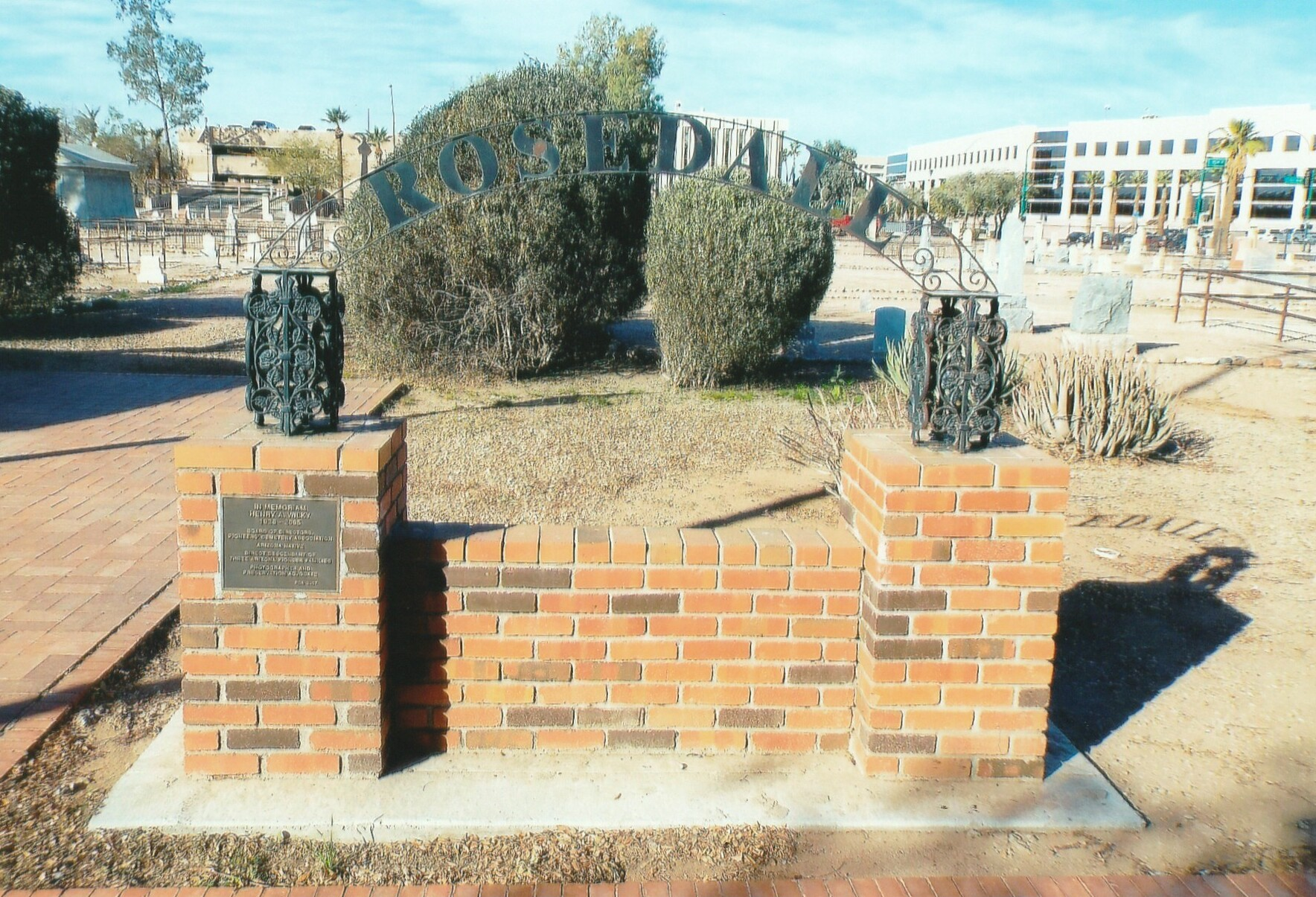
Rosedale Cemetery entrance

- Benjamin Joseph Franklin – Franklin was a Missouri U.S. Congressman and later served as U.S. Consul to China. He moved to Arizona in 1896. President Grover Cleveland appointed Franklin Arizona's 12th Territorial Governor. Franklin died on May 18, 1898.
- Czar James Dyer – Dyer once served as councilman and in 1899 as the acting mayor of Phoenix. Dyer drew the "Bird's Eye view of Phoenix" map which is currently on display in the Smurthwaite House. Dyer died on March 28, 1903.
- Noah M. Broadway – Broadway, who died on November 3, 1905, was one of the original settlers of Phoenix. He was an American Civil War veteran, farmer, and sheriff of Maricopa County. His farm was located between 7th and 23rd Avenues on the south side of what is now "Broadway Road".
- J.W. Bolton – Bolton was a barber who became the first African-American Mail carrier in Phoenix. Bolton died on December 26, 1902.
- Robert Plumridge – Plumridge served in the California Column of the Union Army and fought against the Confederate Forces in the Battle of Picacho Pass during the American Civil War.
Porter Cemetery

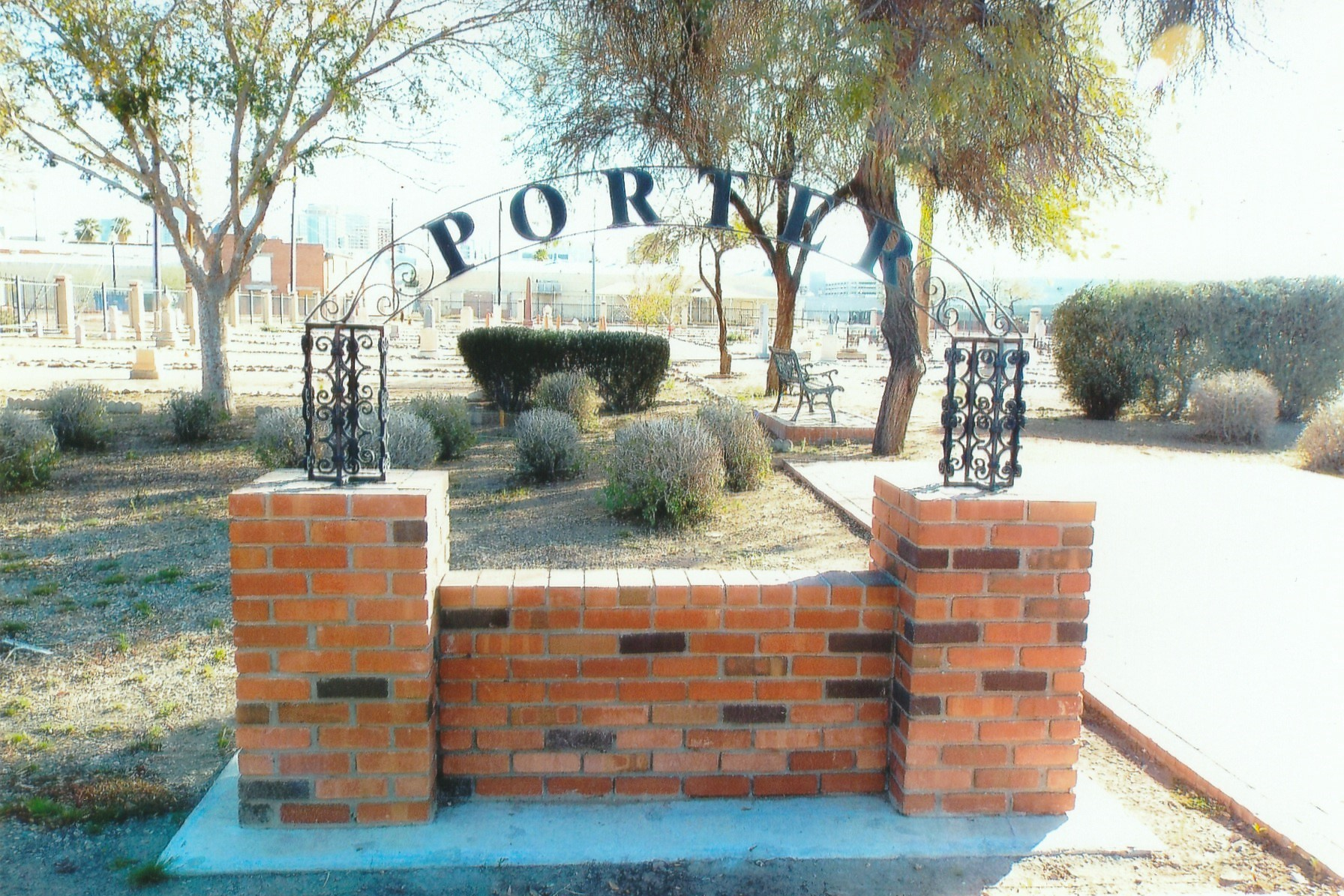
Porter Cemetery entrance

- Clarence Proctor – Proctor was a Buffalo Soldier who was a sergeant in Troop L of the 10th U.S. Cavalry during the Spanish–American War. On March 27, 1900, Proctor committed suicide.
- Millard Lee Raymond – Raymond served as a Rough Rider of Troop F 1st U.S. Volunteers Cavalry in Santa Fe, New Mexico. His unit fought in the Spanish–American War in Cuba under the command of Theodore Roosevelt. Raymond died on January 11, 1899
Knights of Pythias & Ancient Order of United Workmen Cemetery

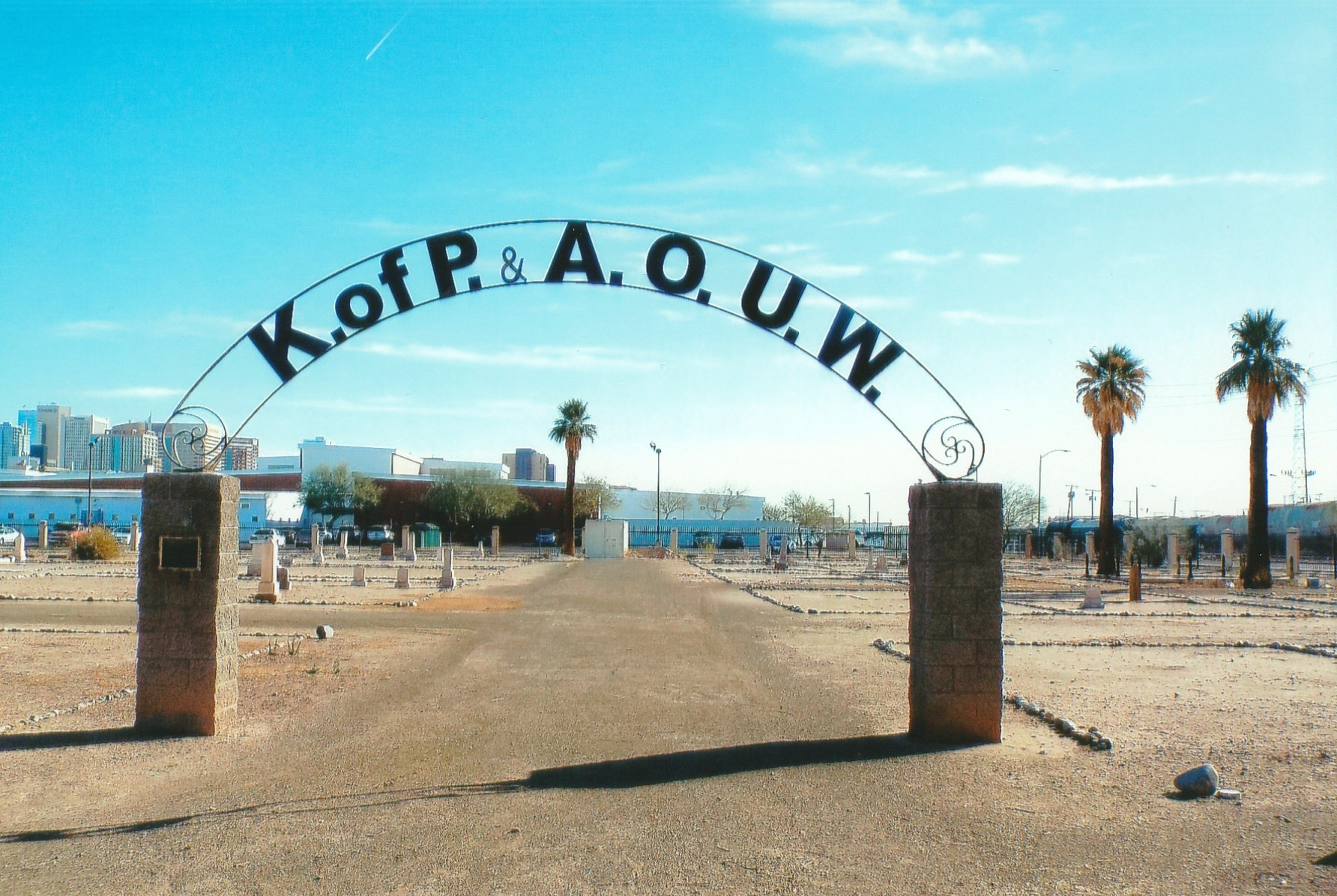
Knights of Pythias & Ancient Order of United Workmen Cemetery entrance

- Frederick E. Tovrea – Tovrea was the 10-year-old son of E. A. Tovrea owner of the "Tovrea Land and Cattle Co." packing house and the "Tovrea Castle" in Phoenix. The child died on July 17, 1898, of appendicitis.
- John Preston Osborn – Osborn arrived in Prescott, Arizona in 1854. While he lived there, he built that town's first hotel. The hotel is also considered to be Arizona's first. Eventually he moved to the Salt River Valley and assisted in the establishment of Phoenix. Osborn died on January 19, 1900. Osborn Road in Phoenix is named after him.
- The Rossen Children – The children of Dr. Roland Rosson, whose house the historic Rosson House in Phoenix is listed in the National Register of Historic Places. Roland Lloyd Rosson died on February 25, 1883, and an "Infant Daughter" on January 7, 1896.
- William Augustus Hancock – Hancock laid out the first town site of Phoenix in 1870. Known as the "Father of Phoenix", he was appointed district attorney in 1871, probate judge in 1875 and was the first sheriff in Maricopa County. Hancock died on March 24, 1902.
- Tom Graham – Graham was the last man killed in the Pleasant Valley War. Ed Tewsbury ambushed Graham near the Buttes when he was traveling to Tempe with a load of grain.
Independent Order of Odd Fellows Cemetery

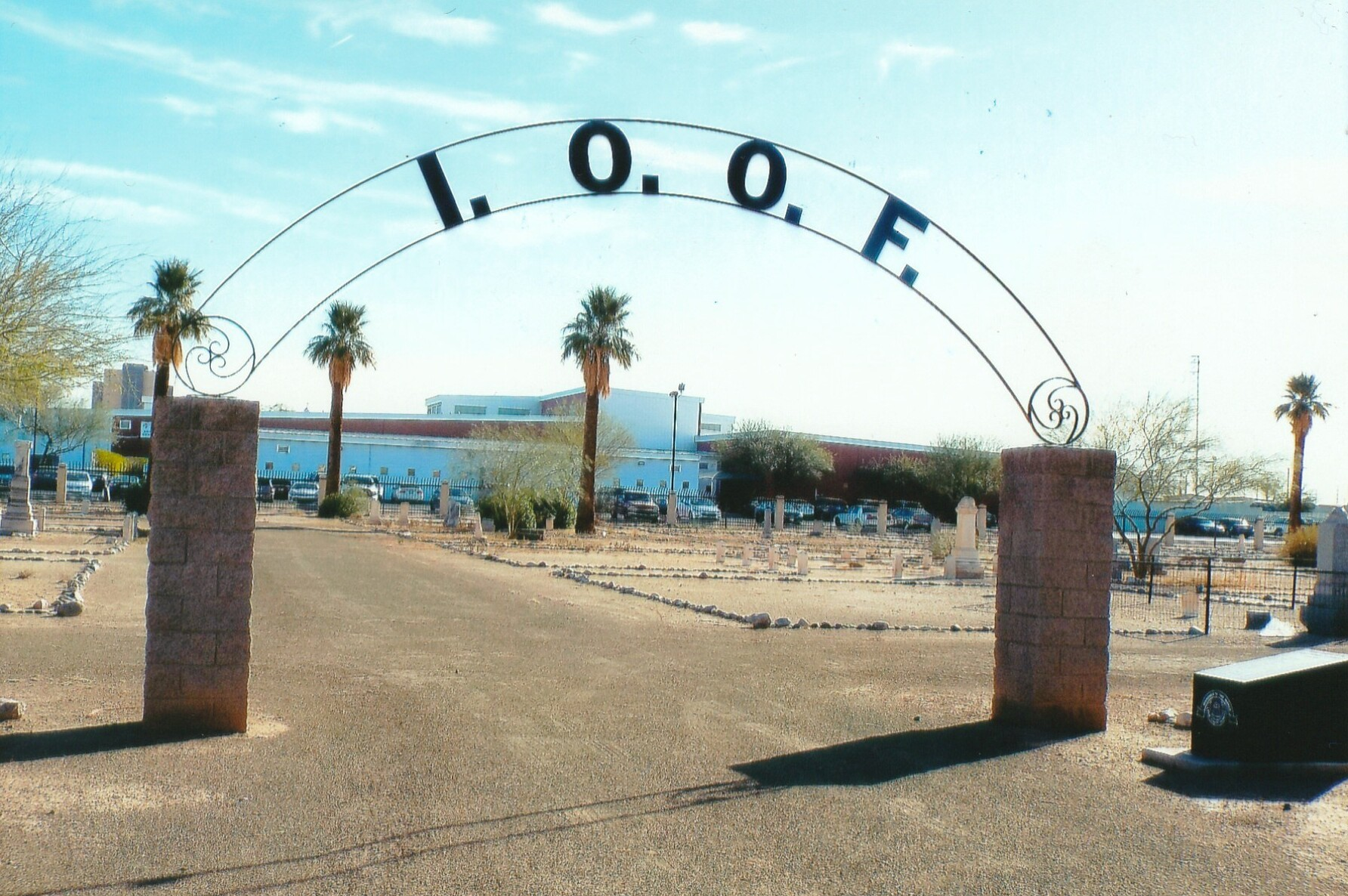
Independent Order of Odd Fellows Cemetery entrance

- Lindley Orme – Orme, a former member of the Confederate Army of America, once served in the Territorial Council and later as Maricopa County sheriff. Orme died on September 24, 1900.
- Frank B. Moss – Moss was the Mayor, Fire Chief and Wagon Maker of Phoenix. He served two terms in office, the first in 1896 and the second 1905–06. He died at the age of 53 from a heart attack while serving as mayor, as he ascended the City Hall stairs.

== Graves ==
Tombstones of notable burials in
the Pioneer & Military Memorial Park
Listed in the National Register of Historic Places
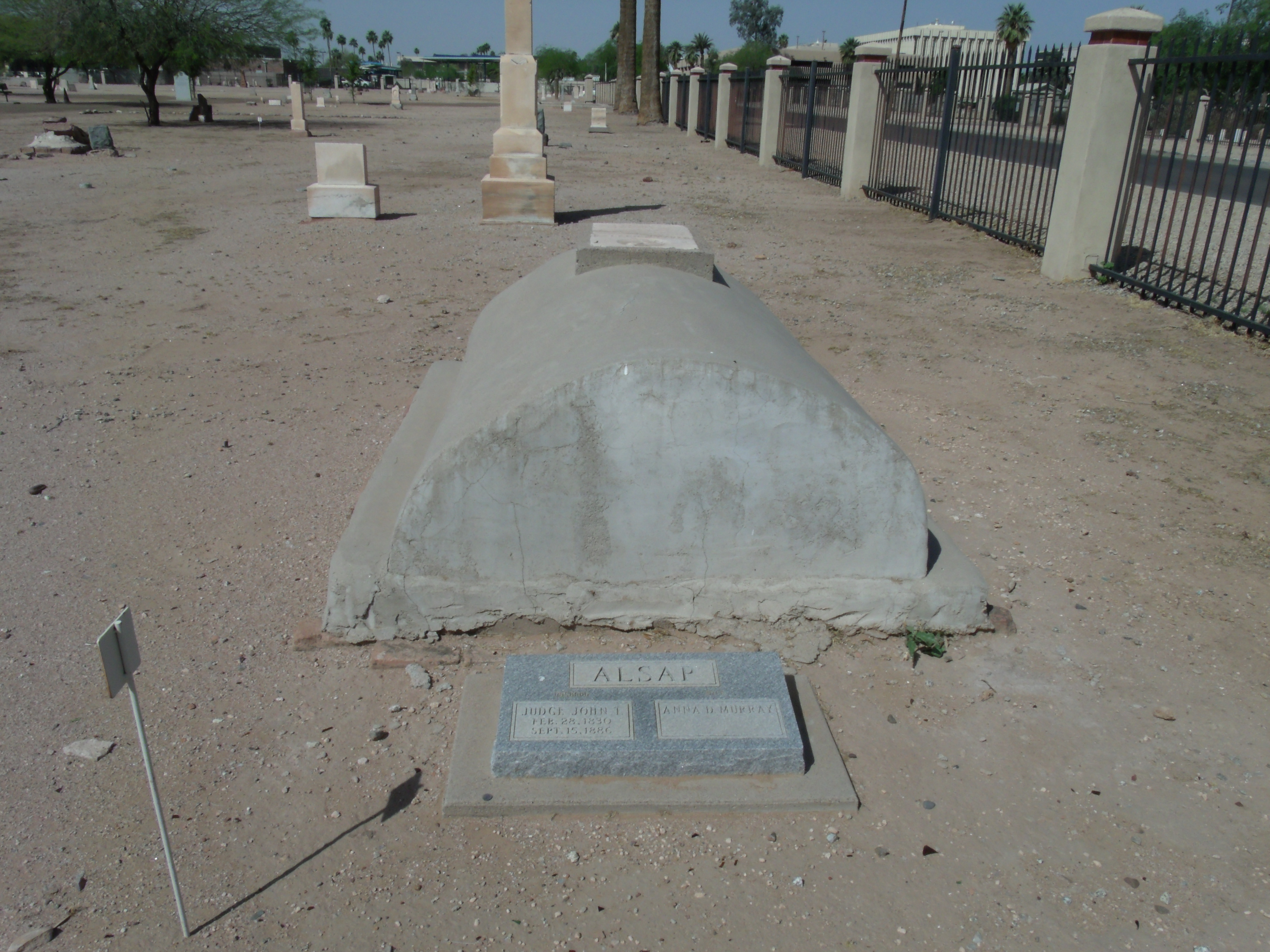
The grave of John T. Alsap in the "Masons Cemetery" section.

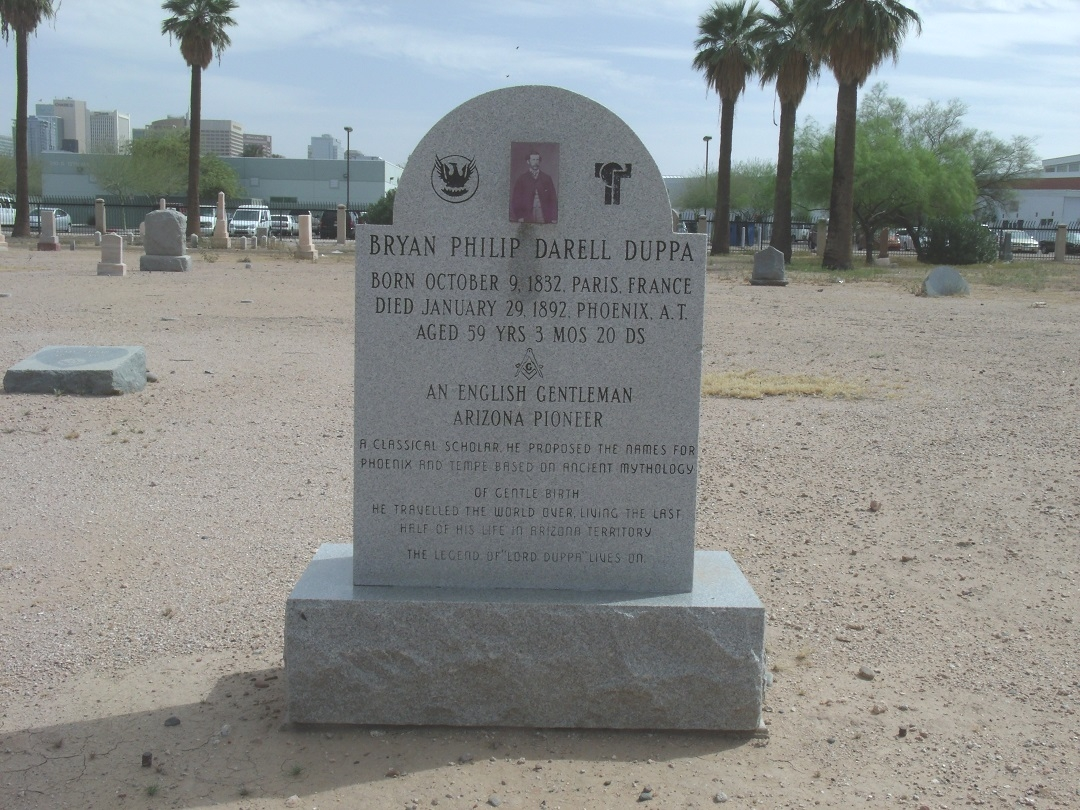
Grave site of Phillip "Lord" Darrell Duppa located in the "Masons Cemetery" section.

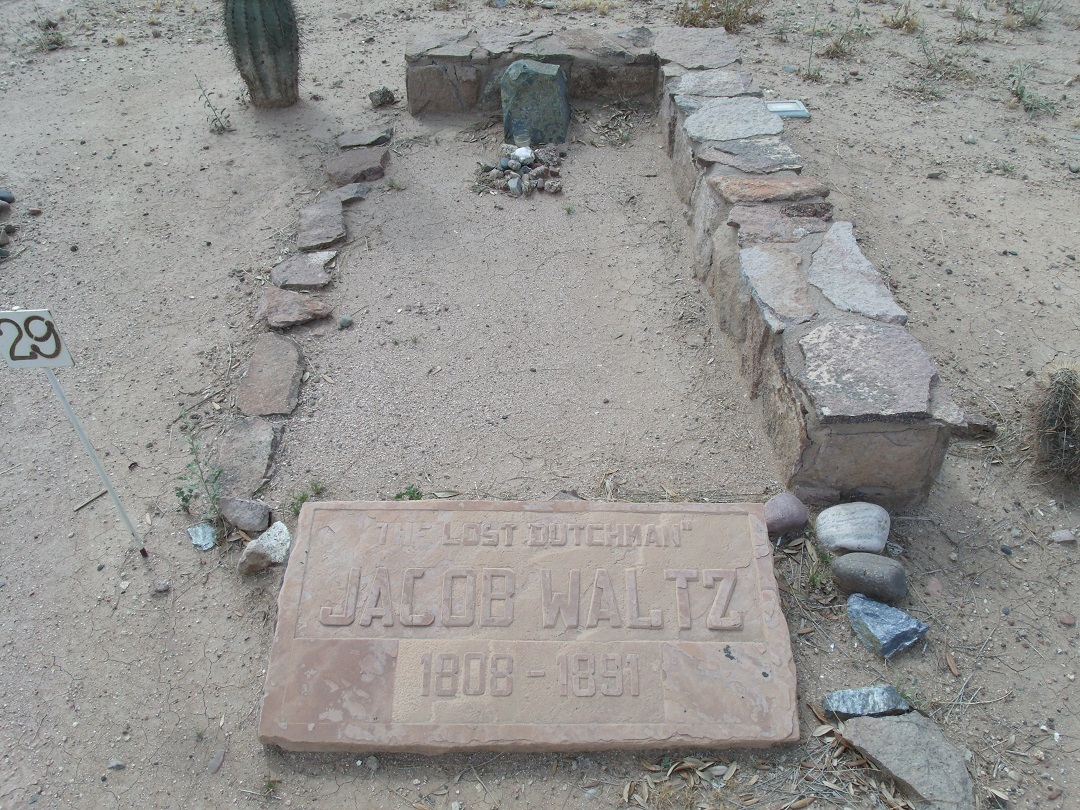
Grave site of Jacob "Dutchman" Waltz located in the "City/Loosley Cemetery" section.

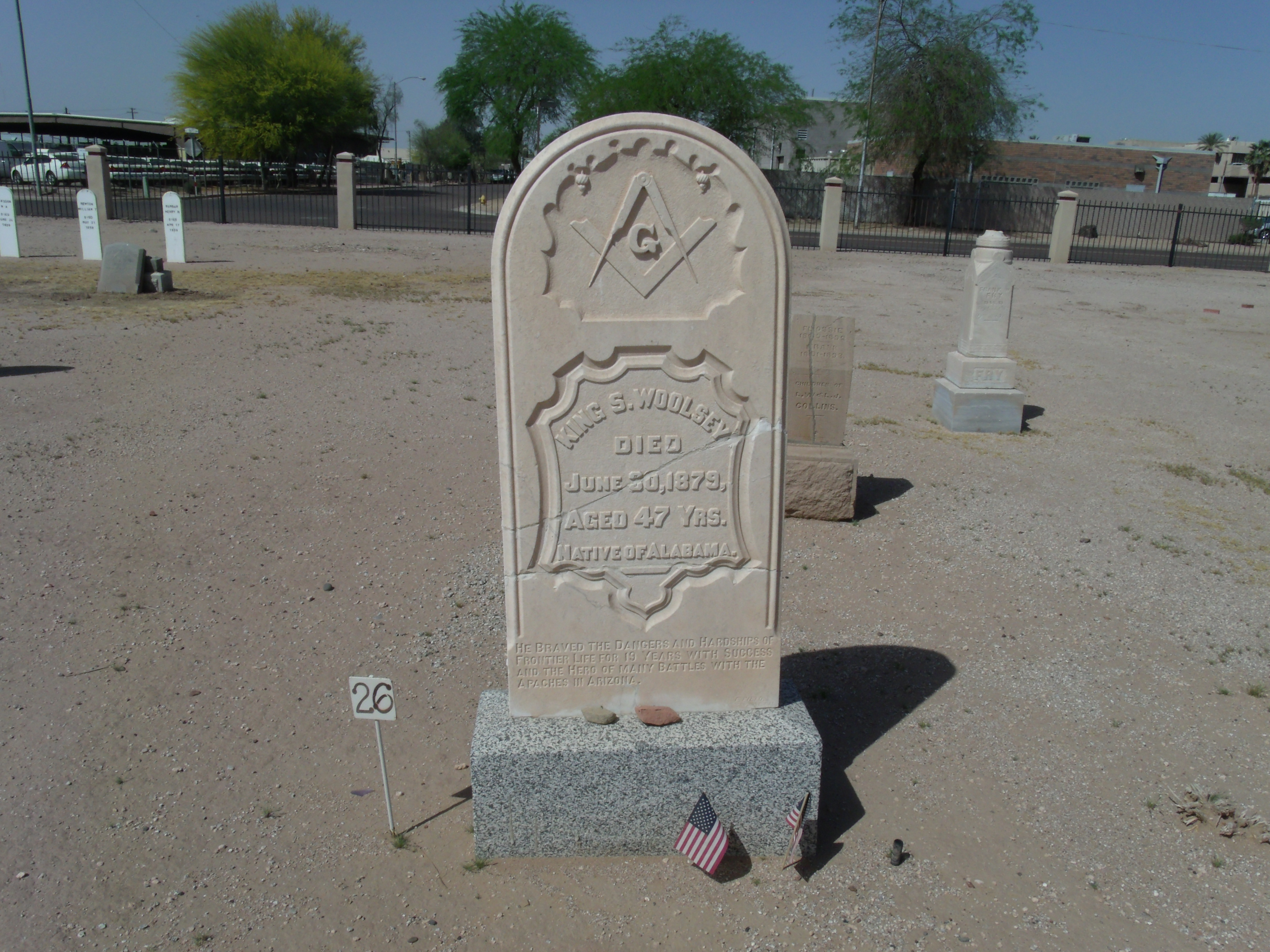
The grave of King S. Woolsey in the "City/Loosley Cemetery" section.

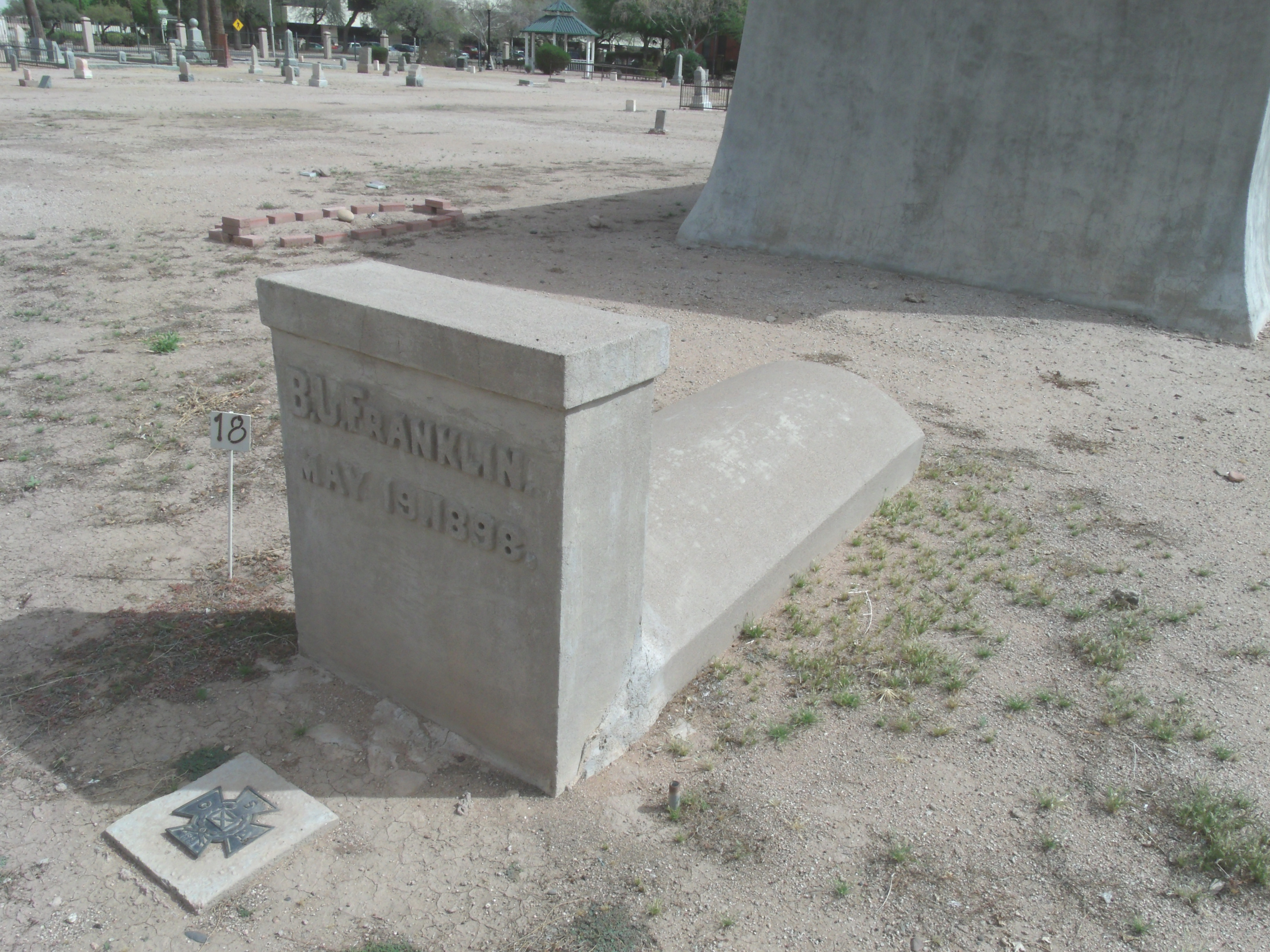
Grave site of Benjamin Joseph Franklin located in the "Rosedale Cemetery" section.

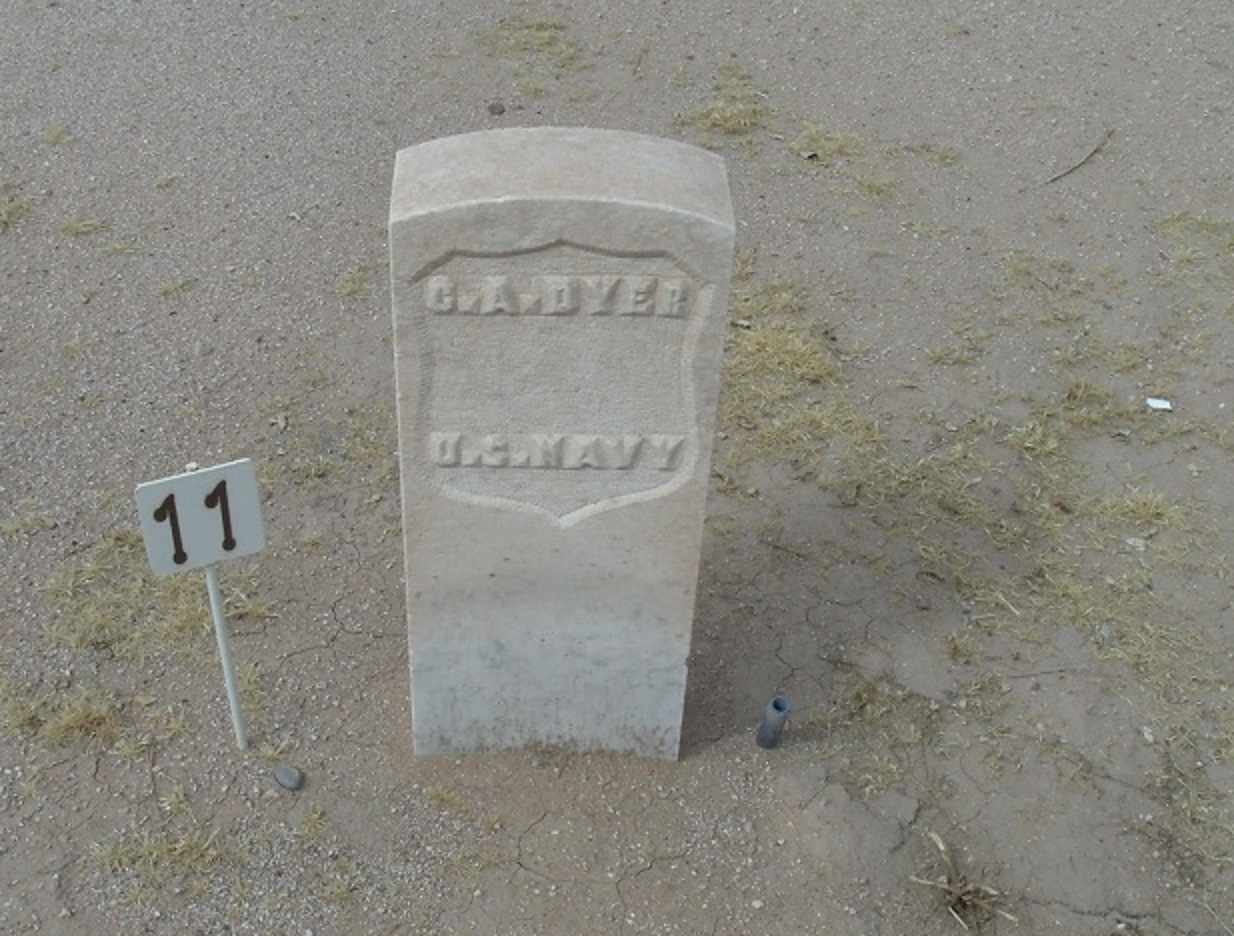
Grave site of Czar J. Dyer located in the "Rosedale Cemetery" section.

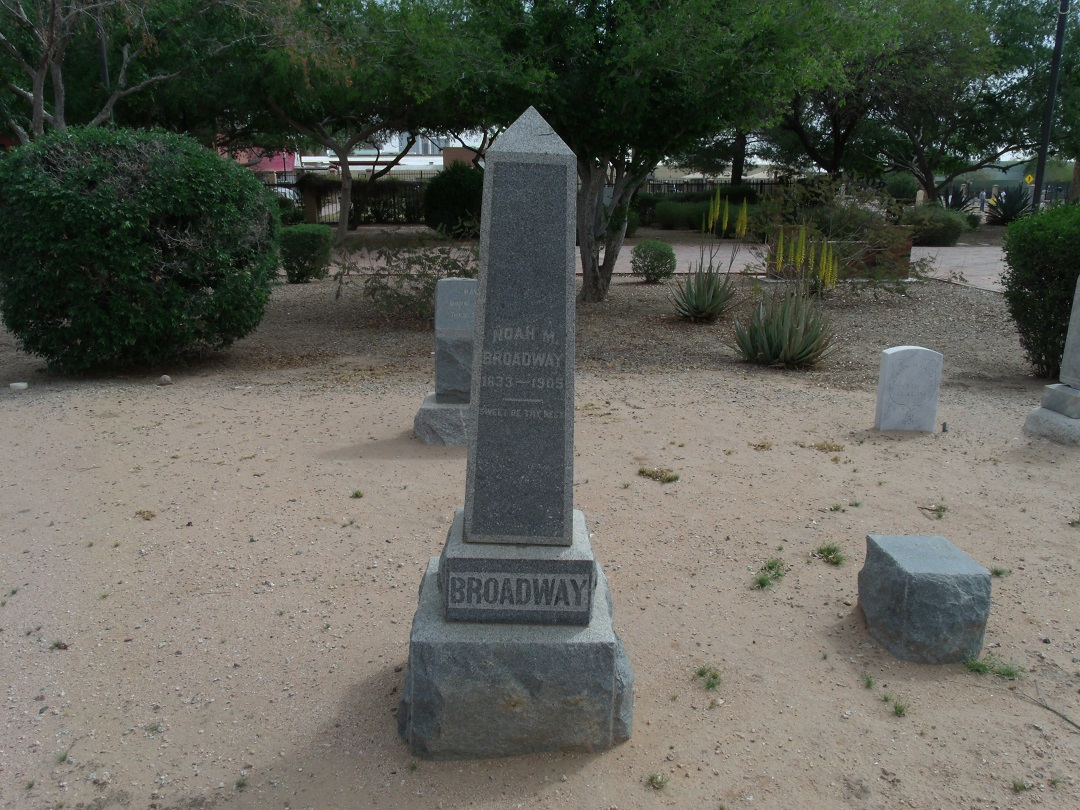
Grave site of Noah M. Broadway located in the "Rosedale Cemetery" section.

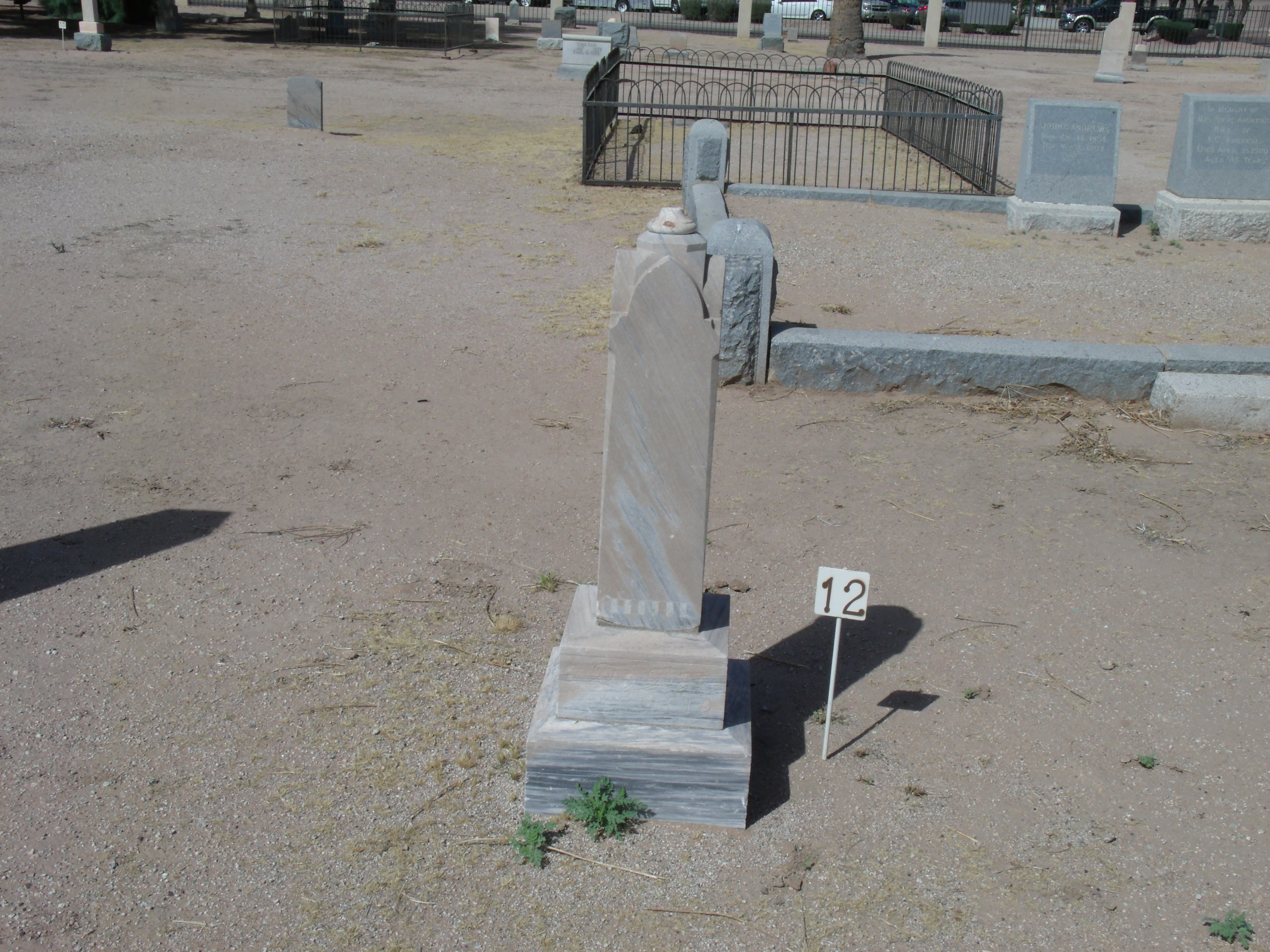
The grave of J.W. Bolton in the "Rosedale Cemetery" section.

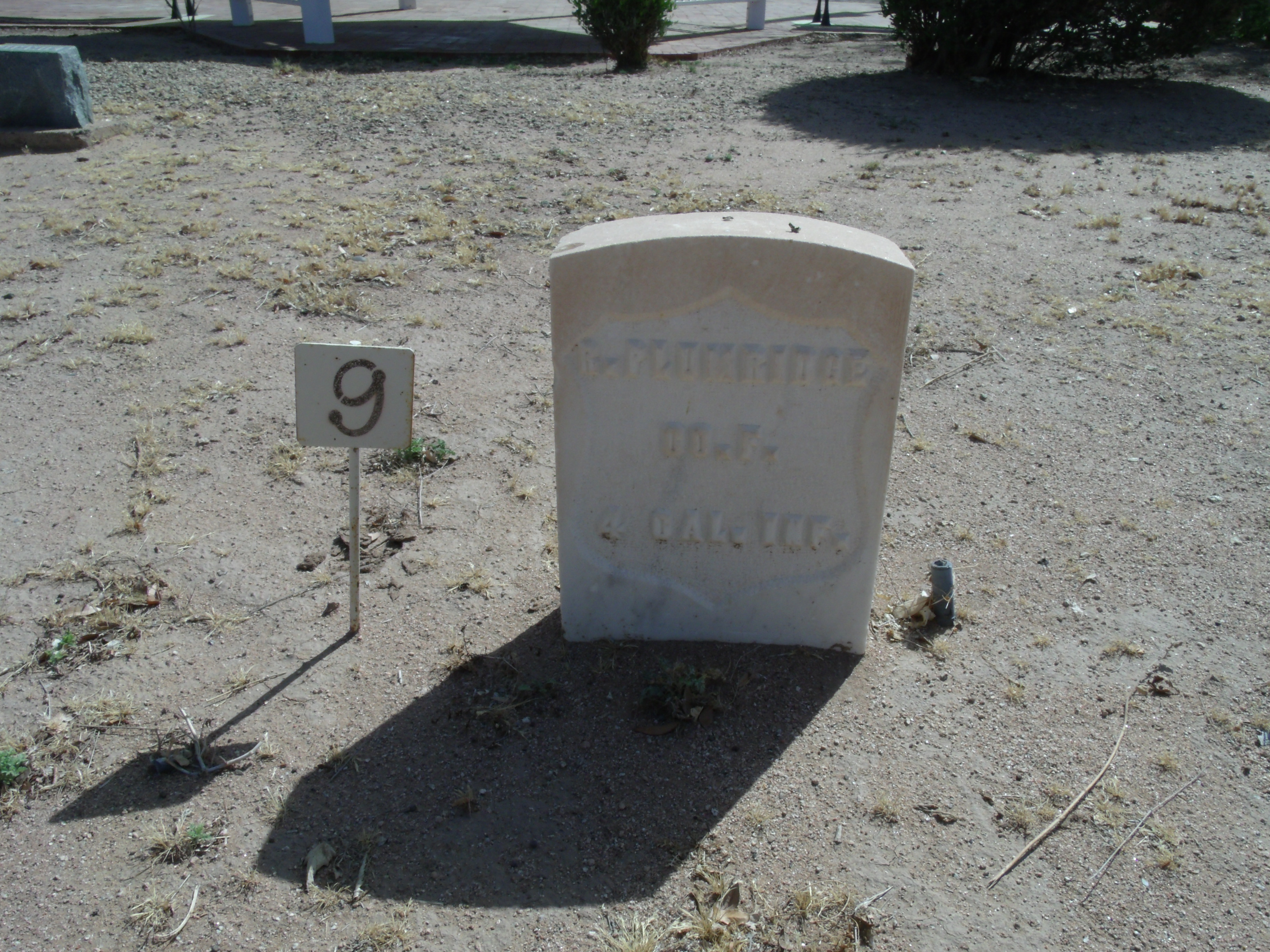
The grave of Robert Plumridge in the "Rosedale Cemetery" section.

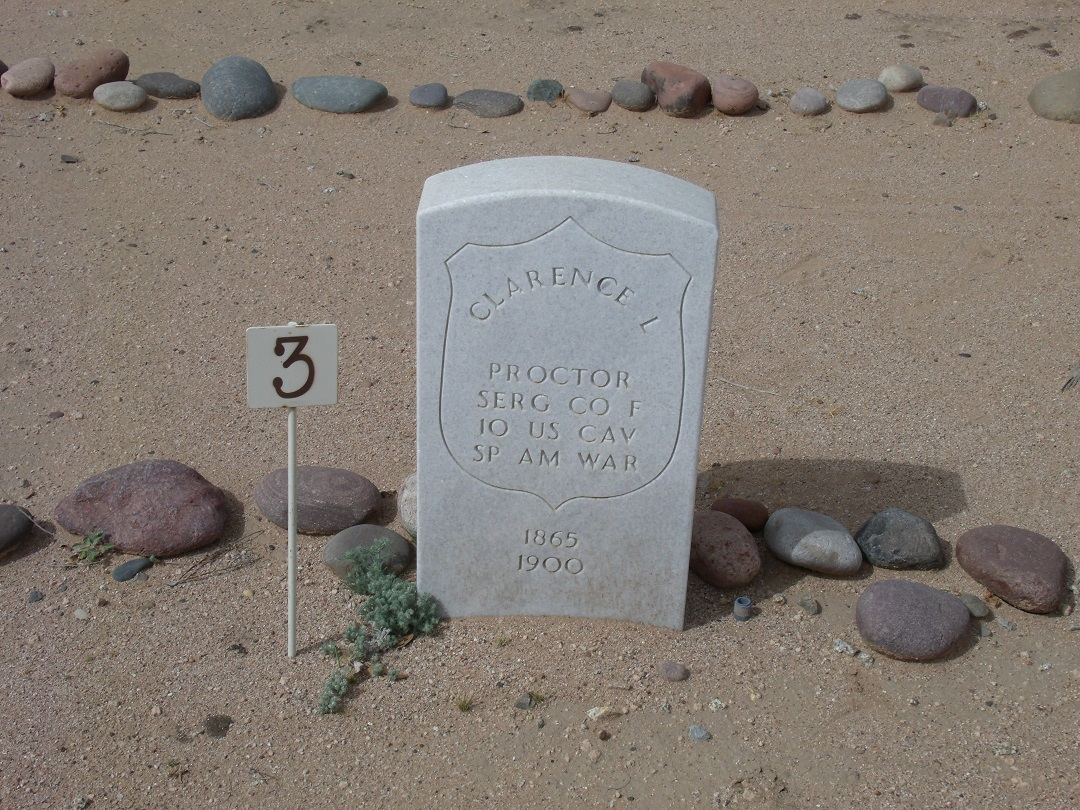
Grave site of Clarence Proctor located in the "Porter Cemetery" section.

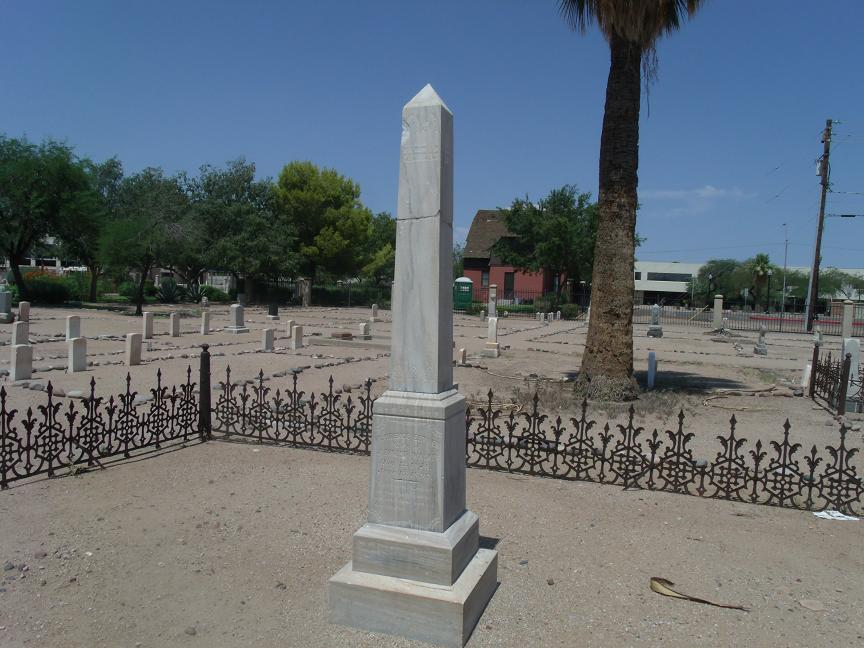
Grave site of Florence Esther Walker, wife of J. Ernest Walker, who died June 13, 1909. Her grave is located in the "Porter Cemetery" section of the cemetery.

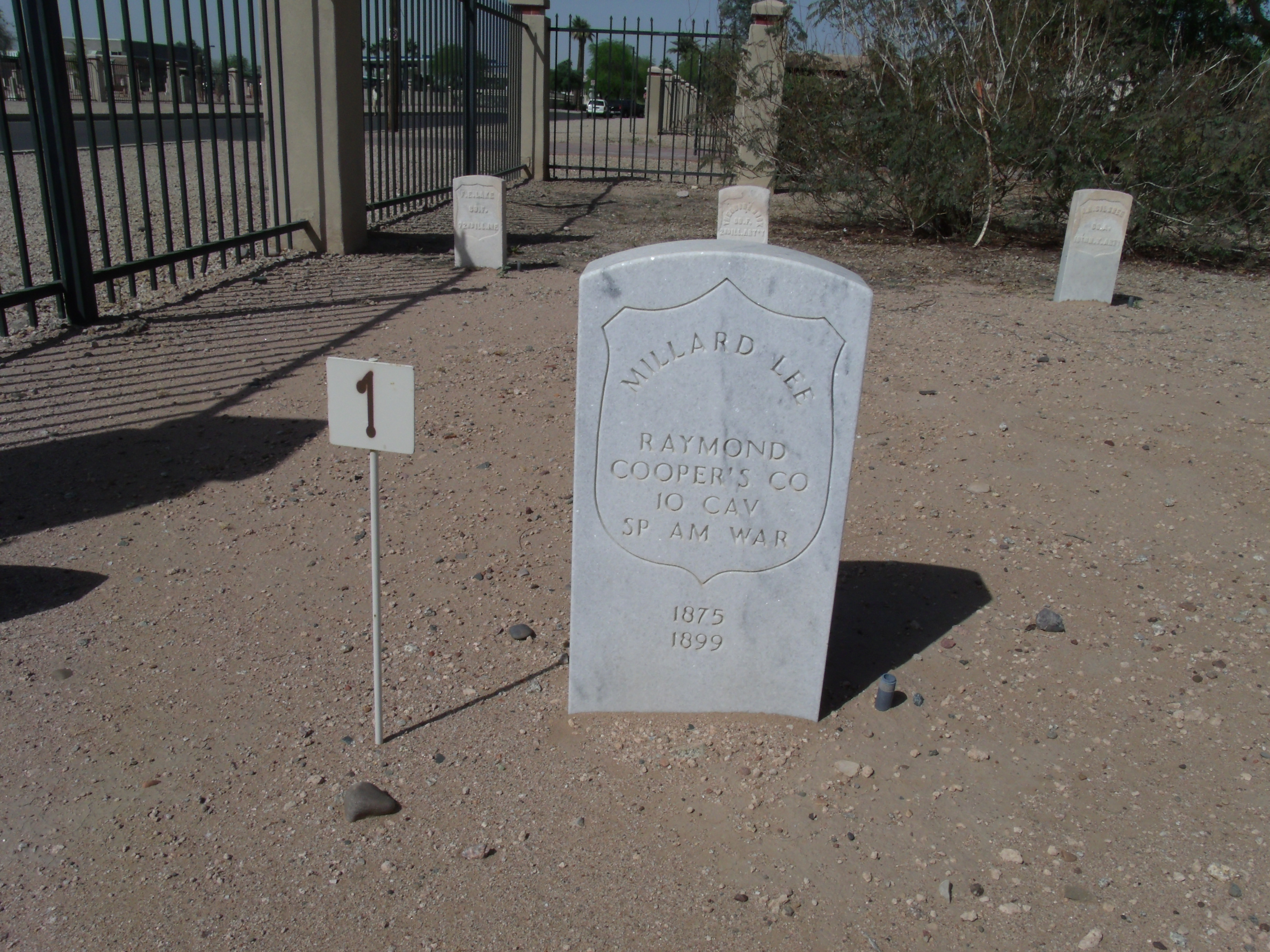
The grave of Millard Lee Raymond in the "Porter Cemetery" section.

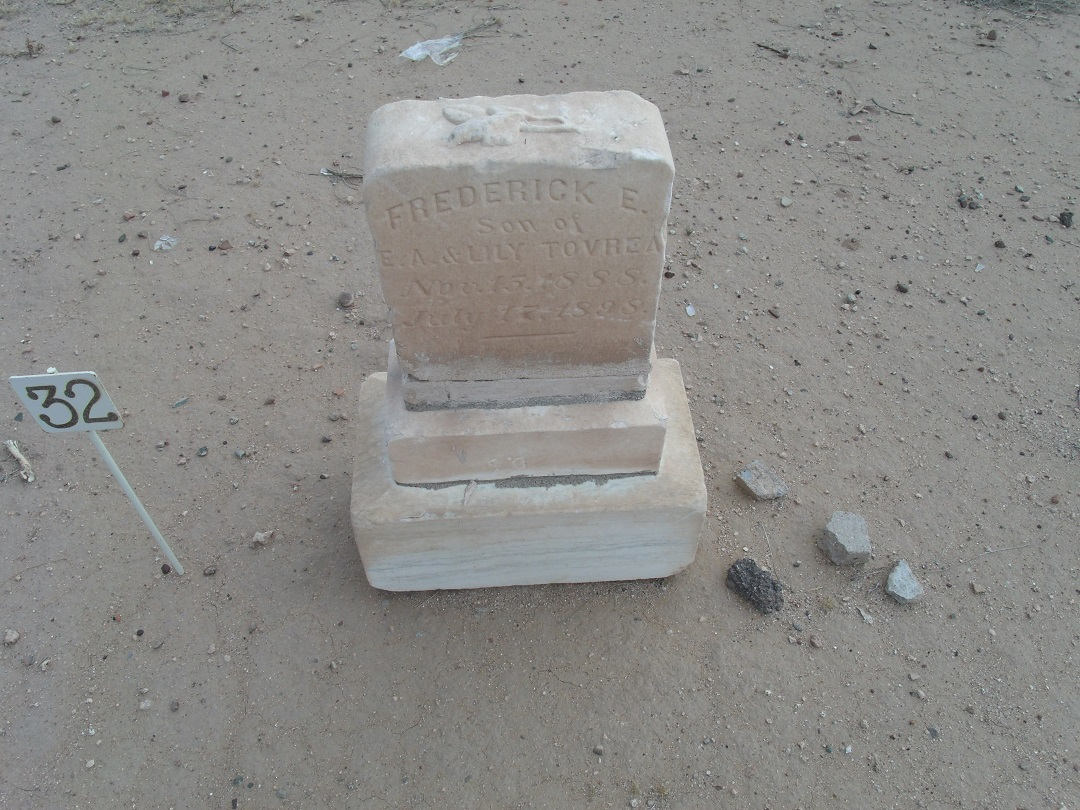
Grave site of Frederick E. Tovrea located in the "K of P & A.O.U.W. Cemetery" section.

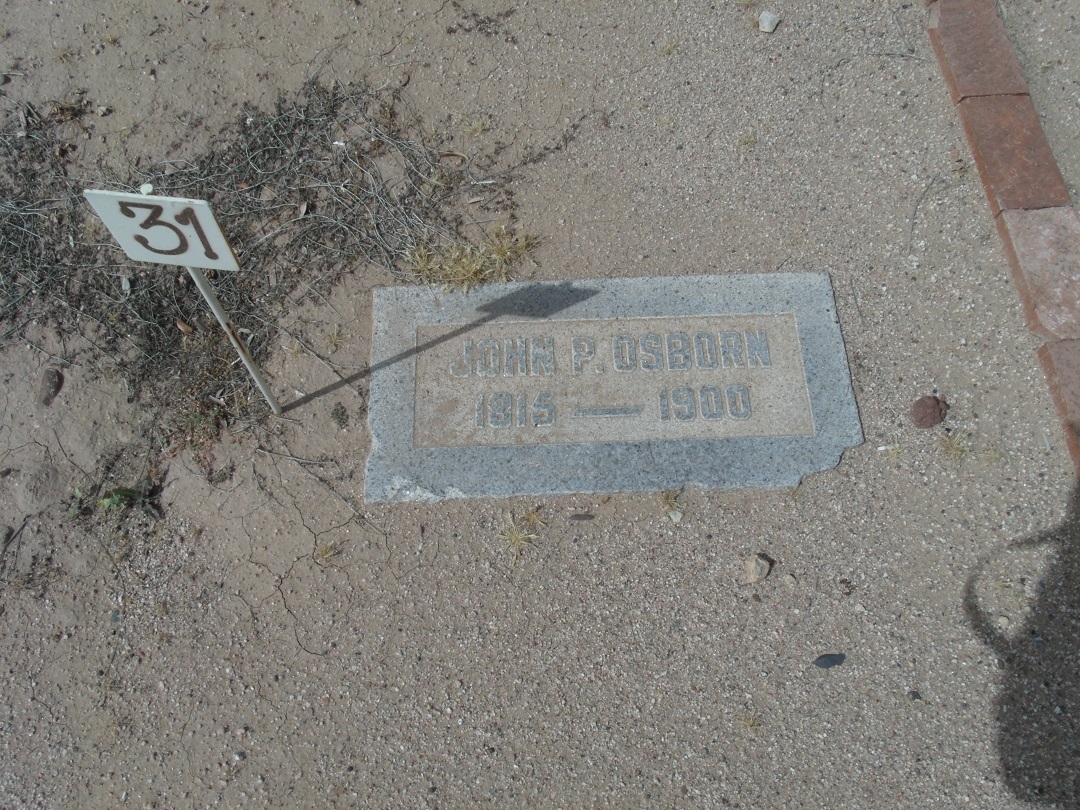
Grave site of John Preston Osborn located in the "K of P & A.O.U.W. Cemetery" section.

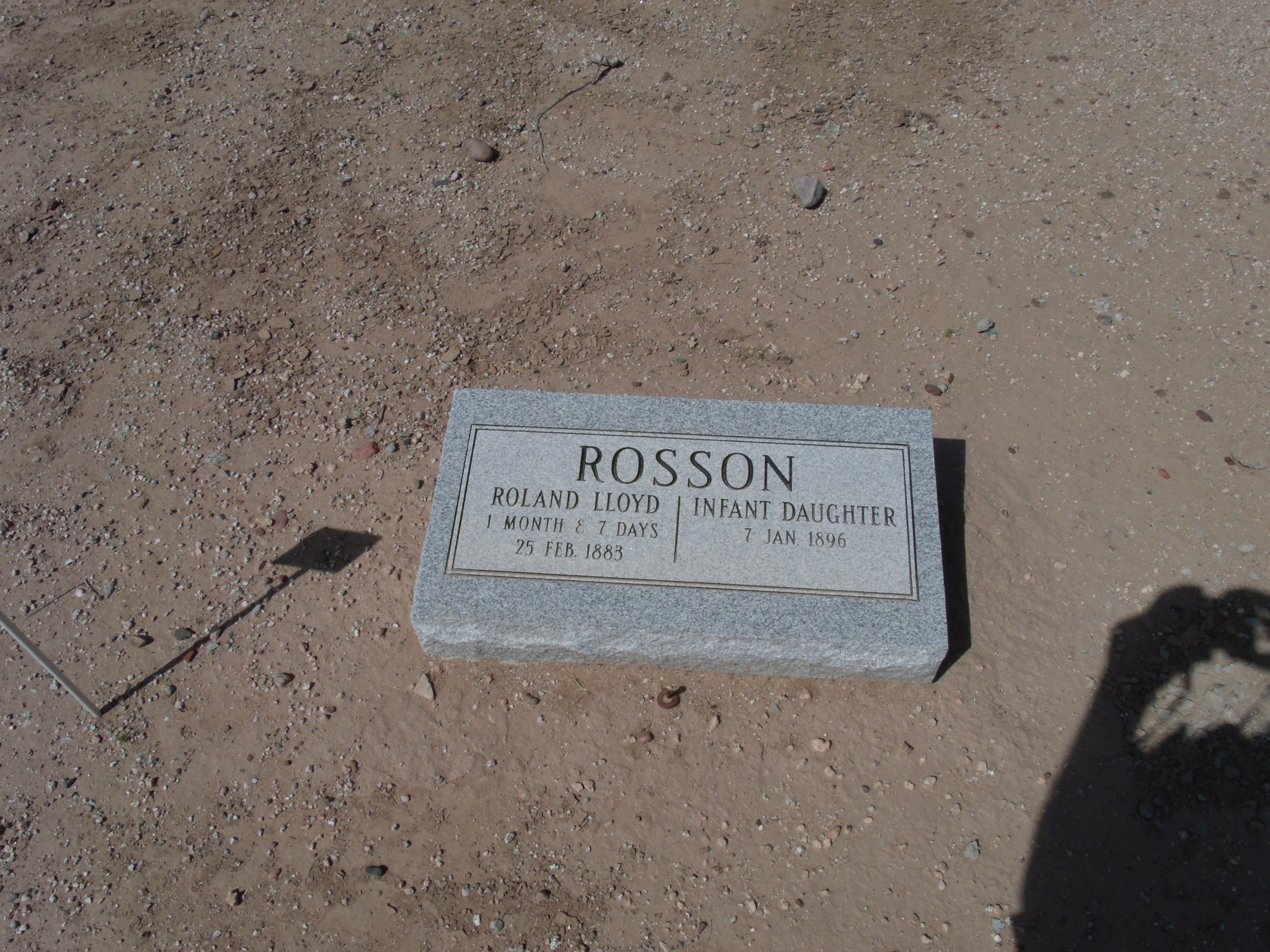
The grave of the Rossen Children in the "K of P & A.O.U.W. Cemetery" section.

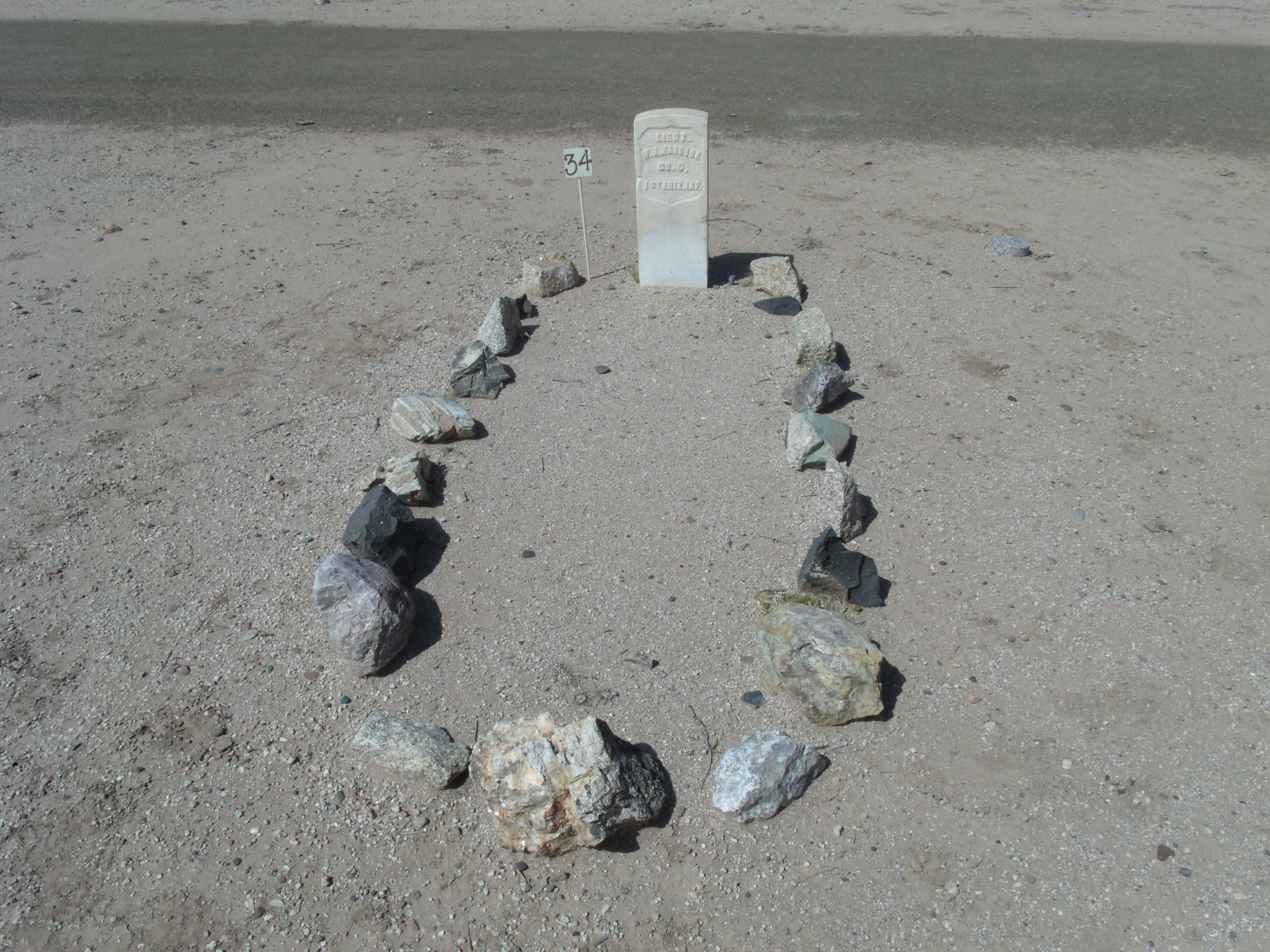
The grave of William Augustus Hancock in the "K of P & A.O.U.W. Cemetery" section.

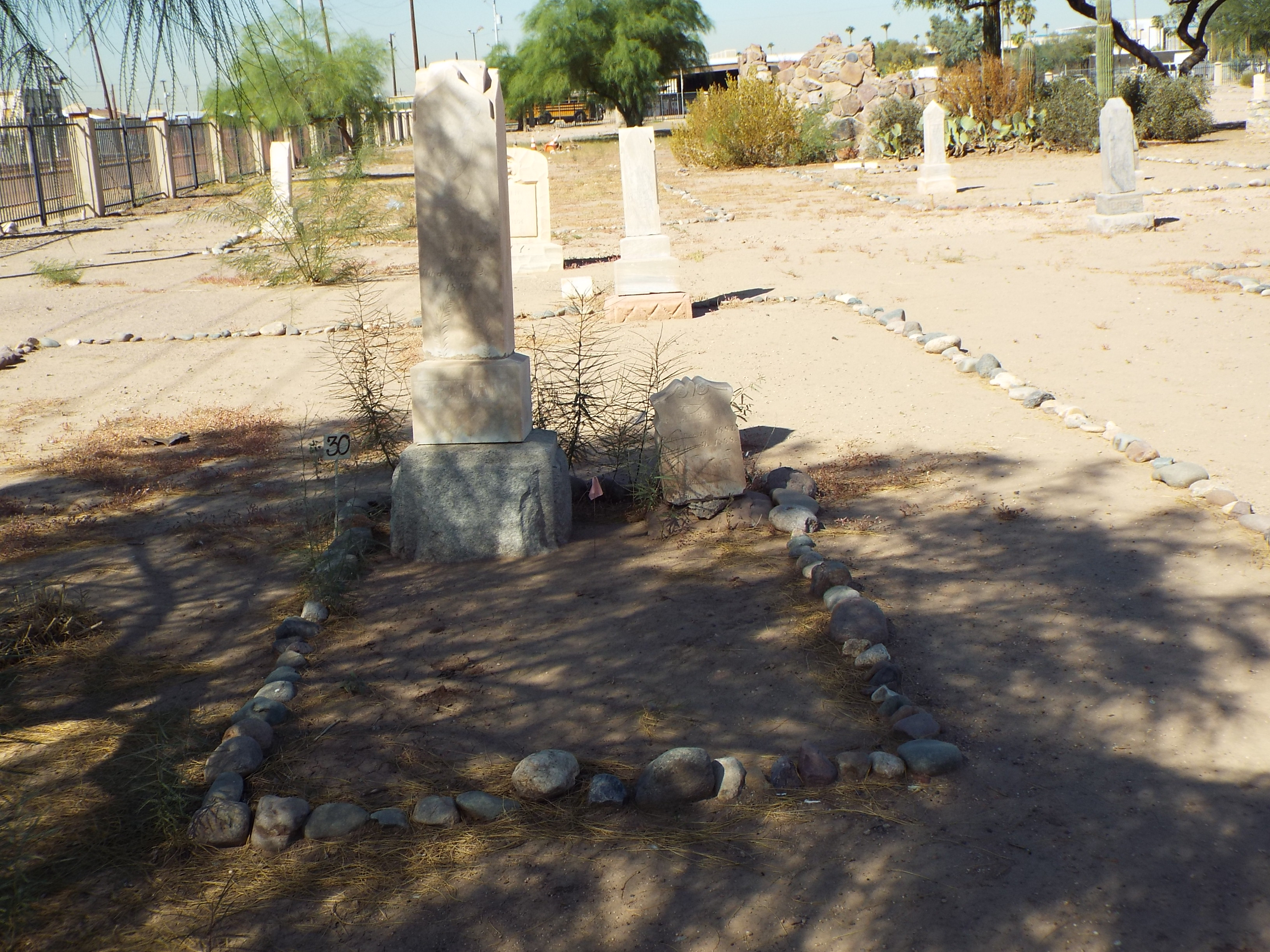
The grave of Tom Graham in the "K of P & A.O.U.W. Cemetery" section.

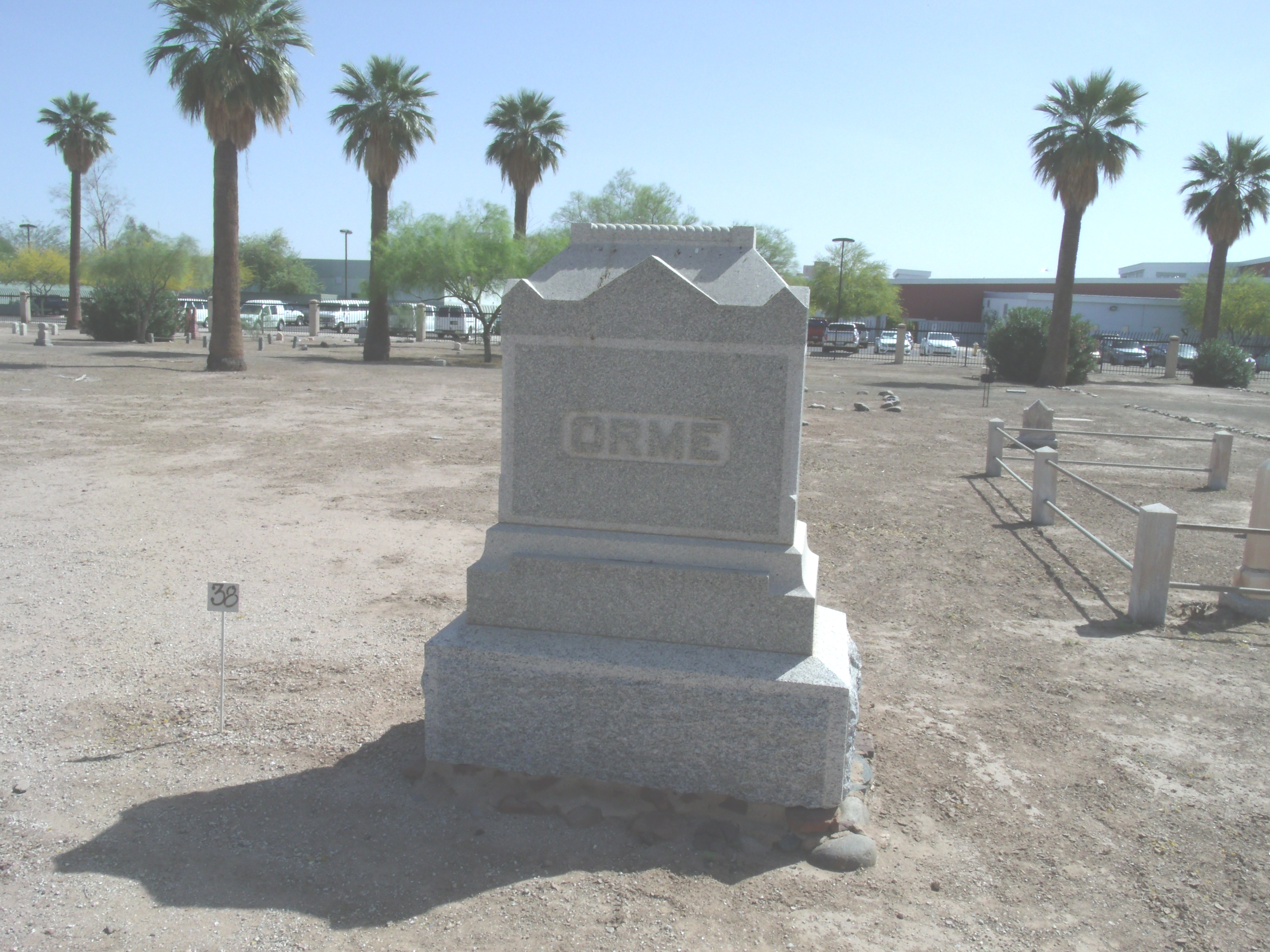
The grave of Lindley Orme in the "Independent Order of Odd Fellows Cemetery" section.

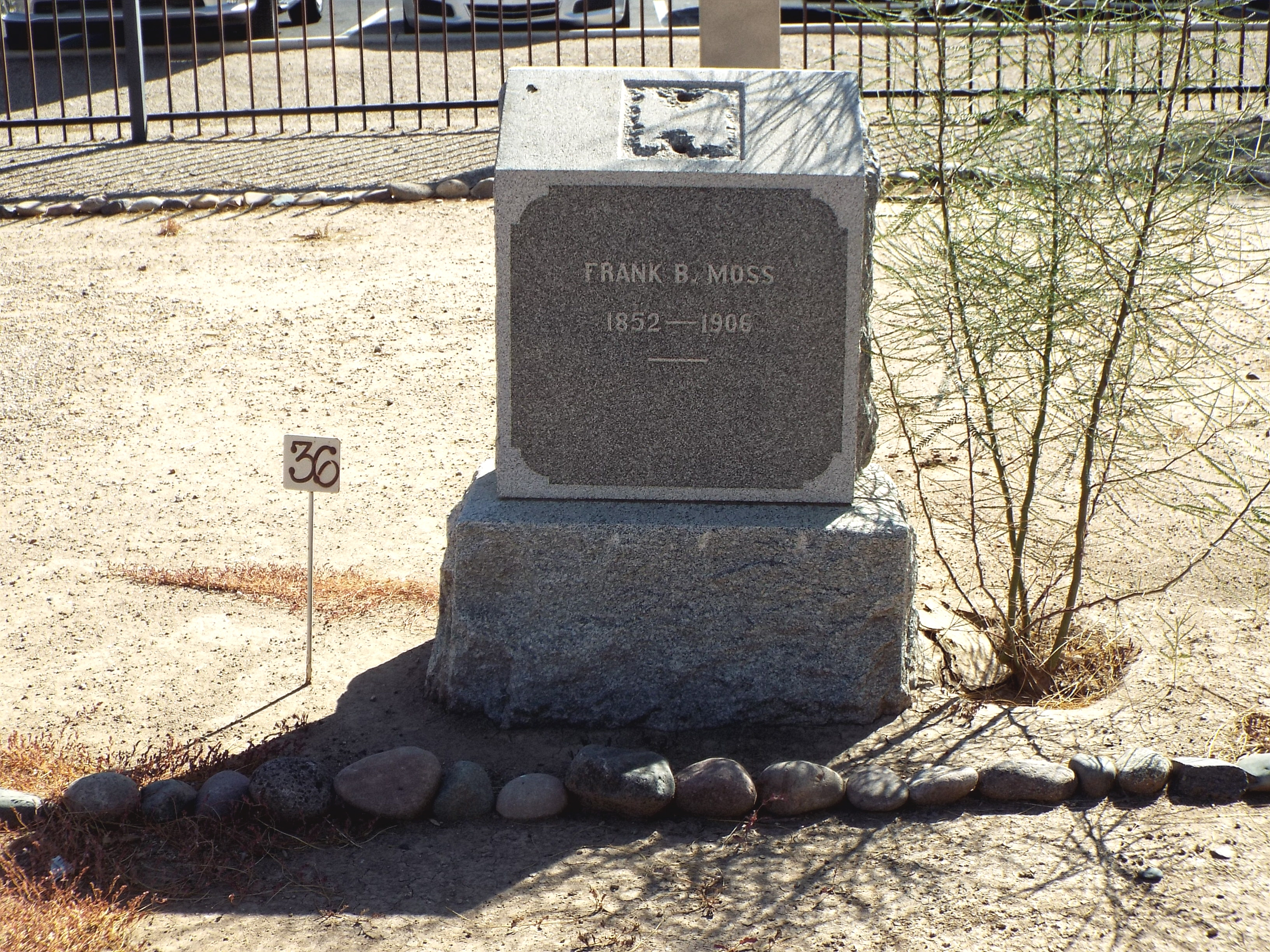
The grave of Frank B. Moss in the "Independent Order of Odd Fellows Cemetery" section.

== See also ==
- Cave Creek Museum
- History of Phoenix, Arizona
- Children's Museum in Phoenix
- Martin Auto Museum
- Phoenix Historic Property Register
- List of historic properties in Phoenix, Arizona
- Adamsville A.O.U.W. Cemetery
- City of Mesa Cemetery
- Home Mission Cemetery
- Double Butte Cemetery
- Greenwood/Memory Lawn Mortuary & Cemetery
- Glendale Memorial Park Cemetery
- Goodyear Farms Historic Cemetery
- St. Francis Catholic Cemetery
- Historic Pinal Cemetery

Other historic Phoenix structures in Phoenix

- Squaw Peak Inn
- El Cid Castle
- Windsor Hotel
- Pioneer Living History Museum
- Phoenix Police Museum
