= Timeline of Mesa, Arizona =

Coordinates: 33.415°N 111.831°W

The following is a timeline of the history of the city of Mesa, Arizona, United States.

== Prior to 20th century ==
- 1878 – Mormon settlers arrive.
- 1883
  - Mesa City incorporated. The townsite's bounded by Broadway Road on the south, Mesa Drive on the east, University Drive on the north, & Country Club Drive on the west.
  - Alexander Findlay Macdonald becomes mayor.
- 1892 – Mesa Free Press newspaper begins publication.
- 1896 – Sirrine House built.

== 20th century ==
=== 1900s–1960s ===
- 1902 – Evans School for Boys opens; later renamed Mesa Ranch School
- 1908 – Granite Reef Diversion Dam is completed; the Salt River Valley Water Users' Association permanently provides water for irrigation canals in Mesa from this point, replacing the earlier Mormon-lead efforts
- 1909 – The original "Old Main" campus of Mesa High School opens
  - Mesa installs potable waterworks system
- 1911 – Roosevelt Dam is completed, regulating the flow of the Salt River for the first time, and providing cheap electrical power to parts of Mesa
  - Mesa takes over irrigation system operation within incorporated city limits
- 1915 – Mesa installs sanitary sewer system and septic tank tract at Riverview
- 1917 – Mesa purchases existing gas and electric utilities from Dr. A.J. Chandler
- 1921 – Mesa Welfare League founded.
- 1923 – Mesa Tribune newspaper begins publication.
- 1927 – Mesa Arizona Temple dedicated (first time).
- 1928 – first production of the Mesa Arizona Easter Pageant
- 1931 – Town area expanded.
- 1937 – City Hall built.
- 1941
  - U.S. Williams Air Force Base established.
  - British Flying Training School at Falcon Field active near Mesa
- 1948
  - Mesa Country Club established.
  - Falcon Field becomes part of Mesa
- 1949 – Modern wastewater treatment plant built at Riverview
- 1950
  - KTYL-FM radio begins broadcasting.
  - Population: 16,790.
- 1953 – General Motors Desert Proving Grounds opens
  - KTYL-TV (channel 12; the current day KPNX) launches. The NBC affiliate continues to be licensed to Mesa, but operates from Phoenix
  - Mesa celebrates 75th anniversary Diamond Jubilee
  - 10 million gallon Pasadena city reservoir completed
- 1962 – Westwood High School opens
- 1965 – Mesa Community College, and Adelante con Mesa established.
- 1966 – An 18-year-old attacks the Rose-Mar College of Beauty, killing five people and injuring two others. The shooting is considered to be the first copycat mass shooting.
- 1967
  - Regional Maricopa Association of Governments established.
  - Original "Old Main" building of Mesa High School burns to the ground
- 1968
  - Tri City Mall in business.
  - KMND radio begins broadcasting.
  - City of Mesa takes over operations of Falcon Field

=== 1970s–1990s ===
- 1970
  - Lehi becomes part of city.
  - Population: 63,049.
- 1971 – Prehab of Mesa (youth-related nonprofit) established.
- 1972
  - Mesa High School reopens at a new location (farther east and south)
  - Mesa Central High School opens at site of original Mesa High campus
- 1973 – Dobson Ranch planned community began selling homes in the first phase of its 26-year development
- 1975
  - After extensive renovations, the Mesa Arizona Temple is rededicated
  - The Park of the Canals is added to the National Register of Historic Places; work then commences for developing park facilities and later the botanical garden
- 1976 – Mountain View High School opens
- 1977
  - Mesa Southwest Museum (later renamed the Arizona Museum of Natural History) founded
  - the original Hohokam Park opens
- 1978 – Western Design Center is founded by Bill Mensch
  - Mesa celebrates 100-year Centennial
- 1979
  - Fiesta Mall in business.
  - Mesa Amphitheatre built.
  - Mesa Weekly News begins publication.
- 1980
  - Population: 152,453.
  - Arizona Museum for Youth opens
  - Used Cars, filmed primarily in Mesa, opens in theaters
- 1981
  - Dobson High School opens
  - Mesa Sister Cities Association and Mesa United Way active.
  - Sister city relationship established with Guaymas, Mexico.
  - Champlin Fighter Museum opens
- 1983
  - Sister city relationship established with Upper Hutt, New Zealand.
  - Mesa Golfland opens, expanding to become Golfland Sunsplash by 1986
- 1984 – Al Brooks becomes mayor.
- 1987
  - Mesa Historical Museum opens
  - Living Word Bible Church active.
- 1988
  - Peggy Rubach becomes mayor.
  - Red Mountain High School opens
- 1989 – Sister city relationship established with Caraz, Peru.
- 1990
  - Population: 288,091.
  - Superstition Springs Center opens
  - first section of Arizona State Route 202 opens; downtown Lehi was removed to make way for it
- 1991
  - East Valley Institute of Technology Main campus opens
  - Mesa Community Action Network active.
- 1992
  - Willie Wong becomes mayor.
  - Mesa Solar Sox is founded
- 1993
  - Sister city relationship established with Kaiping, China.
  - Williams Air Force Base closes, begins transition to Williams Gateway Airport
- 1994
  - Williams Gateway Airport opens
  - Paz De Cristo Community Center opens
- 1995
  - A.T. Still University's Arizona School of Health Sciences opens
  - Heritage Academy (Arizona) opens
  - the current Organ Stop Pizza location in Mesa is opened
- 1996
  - City website online.
  - Wayne Brown becomes mayor.
  - Arizona State University at the Polytechnic campus opens on the former Williams Air Force Base
  - Sun Valley High School opens
- 1997
  - Harkins Superstition Springs cinema in business.
  - Noah Webster School opens.
  - the new HoHoKam Stadium opens
- 1998 – Tri City Mall closes, all existing buildings demolished except for former site of JCPenney store, which remains standing until 2006
- 1999
  - Skyline High School opens
  - AMC Mesa Grand 24 cinema in business.
  - Saint Ignatius of Antioch Church active (approximate date).
  - Sister city relationship established with Burnaby, Canada.
- 2000
  - Keno Hawker becomes mayor.
  - Population: 396,375.

== 21st century ==
- 2002 – Desert Ridge High School opens; it is physically located in Mesa, but is part of Gilbert Public Schools instead of Mesa Public Schools.
- 2003
  - Arizona School of Dentistry and Oral Health opens at A.T. Still University's Mesa campus
  - Champlin Fighter Museum closed
- 2005
  - Mesa Arts Center built.
  - Mesa Miners is founded
  - Mesa adopts city flag
- 2006 – Mesa Preparatory Academy opens
- 2007
  - Mesa Riverview opens
  - Gateway 12/IMAX Theatre (cinema) in business.
  - A.T. Still University School of Osteopathic Medicine in Arizona opens at A.T. Still University's Mesa campus
- 2008
  - October: Immigration raid by Maricopa County Sheriff.
  - Sycamore Drive and Main Street Valley Metro Rail station opens, in front of the former Tri City Mall location; it is the first Metro Light Rail station in Mesa, and is the eastern terminator until future expansions are completed
  - Scott Smith becomes mayor.
- 2009
  - closure of the General Motors Desert Proving Grounds is completed
  - East Valley Mormon Choral Organization established, as part of the Millennial Choirs and Orchestras
- 2010
  - United Food Bank active.
  - Population: city 439,041; metro 4,192,887.
- 2011
  - East Valley Institute of Technology East campus opened, adjacent to ASU Polytechnic
  - Humanist Society of Greater Phoenix active.
- 2012
  - February 22: Republican Party presidential primaries debate held.
  - December 10: Alexander murder trial begins.
- 2013
  - Mesa Grande Cultural Park opens.
  - Matt Salmon becomes U.S. representative for Arizona's 5th congressional district and Kyrsten Sinema becomes U.S. representative for Arizona's 9th congressional district.
  - the inaugural Visit Mesa Gateway Classic annual golf tournament is held
- 2014
  - Cubs Park opens
- 2021 - after renovations and redevelopment of the surrounding area, the Mesa Arizona Temple of the Church of Jesus Christ of Latter Day Saints is rededicated on December, 12th 2021.

== See also ==
- History of Mesa, Arizona
- List of mayors of Mesa, Arizona
- Timeline of Arizona
- Timelines of other cities in Arizona: Phoenix, Tucson

== Bibliography ==
- Ory Mazar Nergal, ed. (1980), "Mesa, AZ", Encyclopedia of American Cities, New York: E.P. Dutton, OL 4120668M
- Otis, Reta Reed (1996). Mesa, desert to oasis. Mesa, Ariz.: Mesa Historical Society.
- Rachowiecki, Rob (1995), "Phoenix: Mesa", Southwest, Lonely Planet, OL 24220208M
