= Timeline of Phoenix, Arizona =

Coordinates: 33.45°N 112.066667°W

The following is a timeline of the history of the city of Phoenix, Arizona, United States.

== Prior to 19th century ==
- 1–300 – Hohokam establish several villages along the Gila River.
- 300 – Ceramics appear in the Hohokam culture.
- 450 – Pueblo Grande settled (approximate date).
- 600–1300 – Hohokam build large network or irrigation canals throughout the area.
- 1300 – Hohokam have largest population in the southwest.
- 1300–1450 – Periods of drought alternate with flooding (approximate date).
- 1450 – Pueblo Grande abandoned due to drought (approximate date).

== 19th century ==
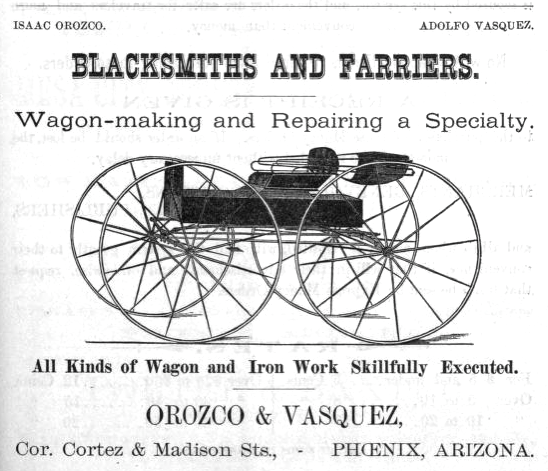
Advertisement for Orozco & Vasquez, Phoenix, 1888

- 1848 – With the end of the Mexican–American War, the area which includes today's Phoenix becomes part of the United States, as part of the New Mexico Territory.
- 1863 – Nearby Wickenburg becomes the first town to be established in what is now Maricopa County, Arizona.
- 1865 – Camp McDowell (later Fort McDowell) is set up on the Verde River.
- 1867
  - November: Jack Swilling, resident of Wickenburg, establishes the Swilling Irrigating and Canal Company with the intent to develop the Phoenix area, which he became impressed with after viewing the area on a visit to Camp McDowell.
  - December: Swilling leads a group of 17 miners from Wickenburg to the Phoenix area and begins the process of developing a canal system.
- 1868
  - May 4: Phoenix is officially recognized by the Board of Supervisors of Yavapai County, which at that point contained Phoenix.
  - June 15: First post office established, in the Swilling homestead, with Swilling as postmaster.
  - Swilling has completed almost 3 miles of his canals.
  - Mary Adeline Gray, the first European woman settler, and her husband Columbus, arrive. They brought with them their African-American domestic servant Mary Green, who would become the Territory's first black settler.
  - Salt River floods for the first of many times during Phoenix's settlement.
- 1870
  - October 20: Town site selected in what is currently downtown Phoenix.
  - Town laid out, original town site consists of 320 acres, or 0.5 square miles.
  - Population of the Salt River Valley reaches 240, the Arizona Territory has 9,658 people.
  - 1700 acres under cultivation in the Salt River Valley.
  - Maricopa Canal completed.
- 1871
  - February 12: Maricopa County is broken out of Yavapai County, Phoenix becomes the county seat.
  - July 4: First wheat ground in Valley at Birchard's Mill.
  - First permanent building, the Hancock residence, is constructed at Washington and First Streets.
  - The second building, a brewery, is constructed.
  - The first store (Hancock's) and the first church (Central Methodist) open in Phoenix.
  - The Tempe Irrigating Canal Co. is created.
  - Tempe founded by Charles T. Hayden.
  - Population of Phoenix reaches 500.
- 1872
  - Adobe schoolhouse constructed.
  - September 5: Public school in session.
  - Phoenix's first wedding, between George Buck and Matilda Murray.
  - Phoenix's first Chinese settlers arrive.
  - The first bookstore and newsstand opened by Edward Irvine.
  - 1873 – Hellings Mill expands to include a hog-slaughterhouse.
- 1874
  - School built on Center Street.
  - Hayden's mill opens. It will remain in operation for more than 100 years.
  - Phoenix's formal patent for the town site is formally granted.
  - Salt River floods.
- 1875 – Salt River floods.
- 1877 – Maricopa Library Association organized.
- 1878
  - Salt River Herald, the valley's first newspaper, begins publication.
  - The first bank, a branch of the Bank of Arizona, opens.
  - Population reaches 1500.
  - Brick factory opens.
  - Grand Canal completed.
  - Mesa is founded.
- 1879
  - Presbyterian church established.
  - Salt River Indian Reservation is formed.
  - The Southern Pacific railroad reaches Maricopa.
- 1880
  - Arizona Gazette newspaper begins publication.
  - Methodist church established.
  - Population: 1,800.
  - First legal hanging in Maricopa County.
- 1881
  - February 25: Phoenix officially incorporated when Governor John C. Frémont signs "The Phoenix Charter Bill", instituting a mayor-council form of government.
  - La Guardia, the valley's first Spanish language newspaper, begins publication.
  - May 3: John T. Alsap defeated James D. Monihon, 127 to 107, to become the city's first mayor.
  - May 9: City Council begins meeting.
  - June 24: Catholic church dedicated.
  - Phoenix Rangers organized in response to hostile Apache activity in Tonto Basin.
- 1883
  - Cotton cultivation is brought to the valley.
  - Two smallpox outbreaks. City creates the position of Health Officer.
  - Mesa City incorporates.

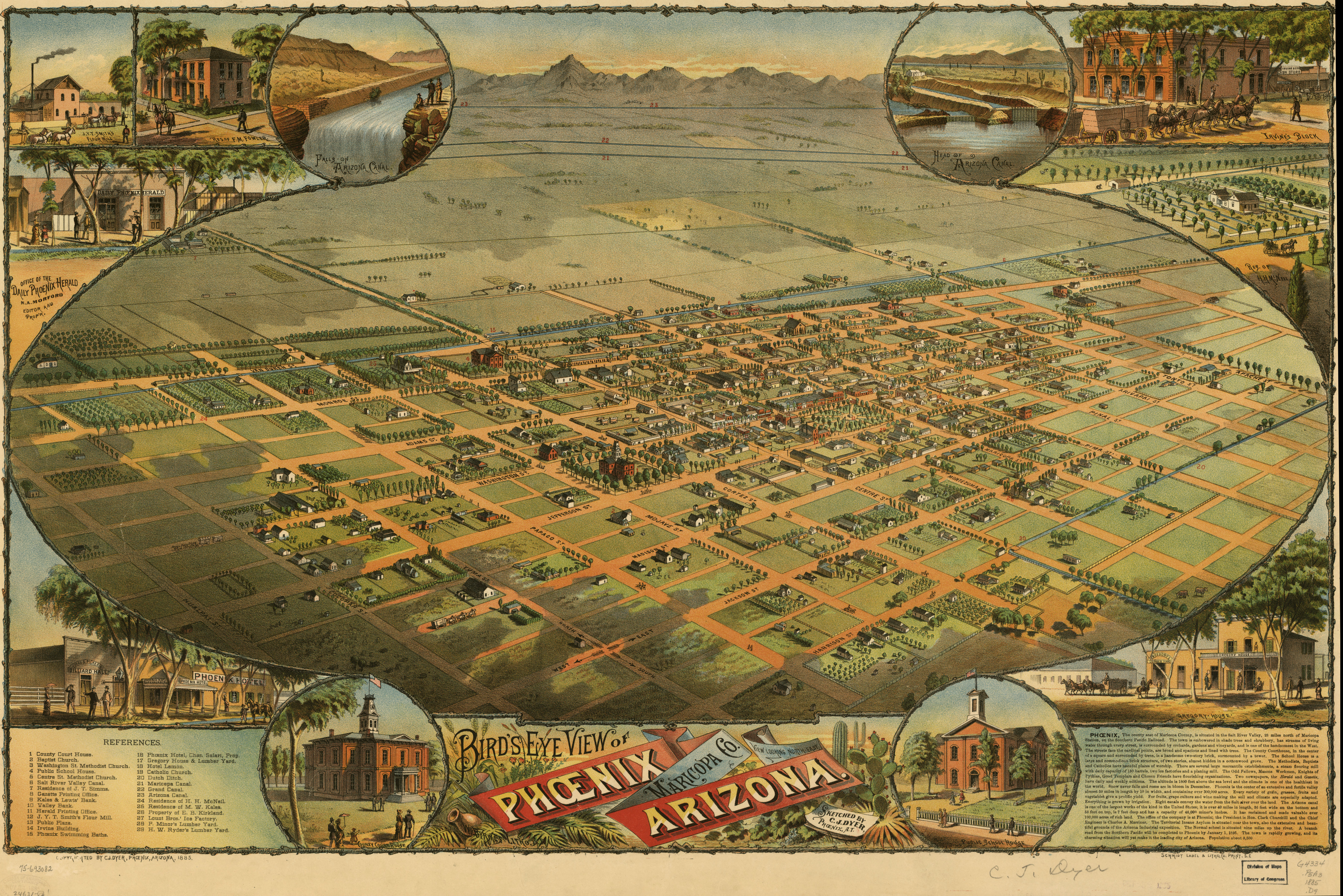
An aerial lithograph of Phoenix from 1885

- 1884
  - Arizona Industrial Exposition begins.
  - Valley Bank founded by William Christy.
  - The Women's Christian Temperance Union opens a Phoenix branch.
  - Phoenix Light & Fuel (electricity and heat) is established
- 1885
  - Arizona Canal completed.
  - Phoenix broken up into four wards, although city officials remain citywide offices.
  - Destructive fire destroys major portions of the town.
  - Arizona Insane Asylum is awarded to Phoenix.
- 1886
  - A second major fire destroys several buildings and results in approximately $100,000 in damage.
  - Phoenix Fire Department established, when bond issue passes establishing 2 fire companies.
  - First private gas lighting company established.
  - First telephone company opens.
  - Phoenix Opera House is completed.
  - Arizona Insane asylum's construction is completed.
- 1887
  - Maricopa-Phoenix railway and horse-drawn Street Railway begin operating.
  - Public water system created.
  - Public Health Department is established.
  - Mule-drawn streetcar system established.
  - Salt River Valley News begins weekly publication.
- 1888
  - Electric power company created.
  - New city hall opens.
  - November 4 – Phoenix Chamber of Commerce established.
  - Peoria is founded.
- 1889
  - Capital of Arizona Territory relocated to Phoenix from Prescott.
  - Citrus cultivation is begun in the valley by the Arizona Improvement Company.
- 1890
  - Arizona Republican newspaper begins publication.
  - Population: 3,152.
  - Walnut Grove dam bursts north of the city, 50 people killed.
  - Ladies Benevolent Society formed.
- 1891
  - Phoenix Indian School opens.
  - Largest flood in valley history occurs.
  - Telephones come to Phoenix.
  - A territorial convention is held in Phoenix. The idea of becoming a state is discussed, but is voted down.
- 1892
  - The Phoenix Sewer and Drainage Department is created.
  - The Phoenix Indian School holds its first classes.
- 1893
  - The Phoenix Street Railway switches over from mule-drawn to electrical streetcars.
  - The Arizona Territory passes a law allowing cities, including Phoenix, to annex land surrounding the city, as long as it obtained the permission of the inhabitants of that area.
- 1894
  - Orangedale (later called Scottsdale) is founded by Winfield Scott.
  - The city passes an ordinance limiting prostitution to a single block area.
  - The city's speed limit is raised to 6 mph.
  - Tempe incorporates.
- 1895
  - Santa Fe, Prescott and Phoenix Railway begins operating.
  - Arizona Gazette newspaper begins publication.
  - Phoenix Union High School opens, and the Phoenix Union High School district is created.
  - Rosson House built in downtown Phoenix.
  - Sisters of Mercy Hospital (today called St. Joseph's Hospital and Medical Center) opens.
  - The New York Store is opened by Sam Korrick; Nathan and Isaac Diamond open the Boston Store; and Baron Goldwater opens a branch of his Flagstaff store, M. Goldwater and Brothers.
- 1896
  - The Adams Hotel opens.
  - Date Palms are introduced into the valley.
- 1897
  - The Friday Club begins a movement to open a public library.
- 1898
  - El Demócrata newspaper begins publication.
  - The block of the red-light district is now illegal.
  - Doris Opera House Opens.
  - First public library opens.
- 1899 – Phoenix Library Association created.
- 1900
  - Dorris Theatre opens (approximate date).
  - City accesses unincorporated lands, area increases from .5 acre to over 2 acres.
  - In spite of efforts by the Women's Temperance Union, Phoenix has 28 saloons and 18 casinos.
  - First automobiles arrive in the city.
  - Population: 5,544.

== 20th century ==
=== 1900s ===
- 1901
  - February 25: The State Capitol building is dedicated, built at a cost of $130,000.
  - Drought hits the city.
  - The Phoenix Women's Club is founded.
- 1903
  - February 7: Salt River Project founded (as the Salt River Valley Water Users' Association).
  - Voters approve a bond to create a municipal waterworks.
- 1905
  - The largest agricultural crop is alfalfa.
  - Flooding once again causes issues in the city.
- 1906
  - Construction begins on the Theodore Roosevelt Dam.
  - Gambling is outlawed in the city.
- 1907
  - St. Luke's Home, a tuberculosis treatment center, opens.
  - The YMCA raises $100,000 to construct a building in town.
- 1908
  - Salt River again floods.
  - Granite Reef dam completed.
  - Carnegie Library is completed and open to the public.
- 1909 – The Central Avenue bridge over the Salt River is approved.

=== 1910s ===
- 1910
  - Speed limit is increased to 12 mph in city limits; city has 329 licensed cars.
  - City schools establish an official segregation policy.
  - The Adams Hotel is destroyed by fire, but is rebuilt.
  - Guidelines concerning surface water rights are established by the Kent decree.
  - Population reaches 11,134.
- 1911
  - May 18: Roosevelt Dam dedicated by Theodore Roosevelt, it is the first multi-purpose (electricity and water) dam built under the National Reclamation Act.
  - Center Street Bridge opens.
- 1912
  - February 14: Arizona becomes the 48th state of the United States; Phoenix becomes the state capital.
  - Women are granted the right to vote.
  - Chandler is founded by Alexander Chandler.
- 1913
  - City adopts council-manager form of government (previously mayor-council), becoming one of the first cities in the country to adopt this form of government.
  - 35% of the votes cast were by women.
  - City has 646 registered automobiles.
  - Ash Avenue Bridge is completed.
- 1914
  - Arizona votes to ban alcohol.
  - William Fairish becomes the city's first manager.
- 1915
  - St. Mary's Basilica dedicated.
  - The city's first sewer treatment plant is completed.
- 1917
  - Arizona adopts its state flag.
  - Litchfield is founded when the Goodyear Tire Company purchases a tract of land.
  - Salt River Valley Water Users Association gains control of the Salt River Project.
  - Migrant workers from Mexico are brought in to pick cotton.
- 1918
  - Alfalfa falls to the number two agricultural product, behind cotton.
  - The Rialto Theatre opens.
  - Spanish flu infects a significant portion of the population.
- 1919 – In anticipation of the upcoming U.S. Census, the city votes to extend the city limits.

=== 1920s ===
- 1920
  - Congregation Beth Israel formed.
  - The Heard Building, the first skyscraper in Phoenix, is constructed.
  - Phoenix Union High School has 2000 students.
  - The entirety of the original Phoenix town site is now completely paved.
  - A precipitous drop in the price of cotton, from $1.35 to $0.35 a pound, creates a financial crisis in the valley.
  - Phoenix has over 11,000 registered vehicles.
  - Chandler is incorporated.
  - Population reaches 29,053.
- 1921
  - Temple Beth Israel, the valley's first synagogue, opens.
  - "Rich, Resolute, Ready, Phoenix, Salt River Valley" becomes the official tourism slogan of Phoenix.
- 1922
  - Valley and Gila River Banks merge.
  - Water from the Verde River becomes available through a 30-mile-long (48 km) wooden pipeline.
  - KFAD becomes the city's first radio station (later renamed KTAR; it was followed shortly by KFCB, which today is called KOY).
- 1923
  - Cave Creek Dam is completed.
  - Salt River Project absorbs the Tempe Irrigating Canal Company.
  - Union Station built.
  - Deaconess Hospital (today known as Banner Good Samaritan Medical Center) opens.
- 1924
  - Luhrs Building constructed.
  - The depression caused by the drop in the cotton price in 1920 ends.
  - Phoenix Sanitarium opens.
  - Jokake Inn opens.
  - South Mountain Park (originally named Phoenix Mountain Park) is created.
- 1925
  - 12 subdivisions are annexed by Phoenix.
  - Phoenix Fine Arts Association formed.
  - The private electric streetcar system is purchased by the City of Phoenix for $20,000.
  - Mormon Flat Dam completed.
  - Voters approve a separate high school for blacks.
  - First municipal airport is opened, near Christy Road and 59th Avenue.
  - City implements a zoning program.
- 1926
  - The Phoenix Main Line of the Southern Pacific Railroad is completed, intercontinental rail will begin being routed through Phoenix the following year.
  - The first Annual Masque of the Yellow Moon is held.
  - The segregated Phoenix Union Colored High School opens.
- 1927
  - Salt River Canal is diverted underground.
  - Phoenix voters approve a $750,000 bond issue to improve the street car system.
  - Horse Mesa Dam is completed.
- 1928
  - Hotel San Carlos and Westward Ho hotel open.
  - Phoenix completes 2 years of annexation, absorbing 74 subdivisions.
  - Construction of Sky Harbor Airport is begun.
  - Phoenix Little Theatre is incorporated.
  - The first paved road connecting Phoenix with Los Angeles (via Blythe), is completed.
  - City creates a zoning and planning commission.
- 1929
  - February 23: Arizona Biltmore Hotel opens.
  - February 23: Scheduled airline service from Los Angeles to Phoenix begins.
  - September 2: Sky Harbor Airport opens.
  - City sells municipal airport.
  - Heard Museum opens.
  - The Tempe Normal School is renamed Arizona State Teachers College.
  - Orpheum Theatre and First Baptist Church built.
  - City Archaeologist position established.
  - Tourism revenue tops $10 million for first time.
  - Phoenix has over 53,000 registered cars.

=== 1930s ===
- 1930
  - March 4: Coolidge Dam dedicated by Calvin Coolidge.
  - American Airlines brings passenger and air postal service to Phoenix.
  - KTAR becomes an NBC affiliate.
  - Stuart Mountain Dam is completed.
  - The high school installs lights in its athletic stadium.
  - Population reaches 48,118.
- 1931
  - Hunt's Tomb built in Papago Park.
  - Construction on Tovrea Castle completed.
  - Fox Movie Palace opens.
- 1932
  - Wrigley Mansion completed.
  - State of Arizona repeals state law banning alcohol.
  - The inaugural Phoenix Open is held.
- 1933
  - Since the start of the Great Depression, 33% of banks and savings & loans in the valley have failed.
  - Over 300 bars have obtained liquor licenses since the repeal of the Arizona state law banning alcohol.
  - Pueblo Grande Museum Archaeological Park opens.
- 1934
  - Encanto Park opens in central Phoenix.
  - The term, "Valley of the Sun" is invented by a local advertising agency.
- 1935
  - July 16: The city of Phoenix purchases Sky Harbor Airport, which has been run by the city ever since.
  - The Federal government becomes the largest employer in Phoenix.
- 1936 – Federal Building-U.S. Post Office built.
- 1937
  - Federal Art Center established, which will become the Phoenix Art Museum.
  - Salt River Project Agricultural Improvement and Power District is created.
- 1938 – Phoenix Thunderbirds are created by the Chamber of Commerce.
- 1939
  - Desert Botanical Garden opens.
  - Bartlett Dam completed.
  - The city's second high school, North High School, opens.

=== 1940s ===
- 1940
  - Civic Center Association formed to raise funds for Phoenix Art Center. It was dissolved in 1955 when all fund raising and archival activities were taken over by the Fine Arts Association.
  - Population reaches 65,414.
- 1941
  - January 2: Construction begins on Thunderbird Field in nearby Glendale (later renamed Thunderbird Field No. 1), funded by a collaborative group of Hollywood personalities, including James Stewart, Henry Fonda, Cary Grant, and Margaret Sullavan. The field opens in April.
  - Luke Air Force Base opens, its first class graduating in June.
  - Williams Air Force Base opens in December.
  - Falcon Field opens in nearby Mesa as a training location for British RAF pilots.
  - Urban renewal project creates 3 new housing developments: Marcos de Niza Project for Mexicans, Matthew Henson Project for Blacks, and Frank Luke Jr. Project for Whites.
- 1942
  - April 1: the Desert Training Center, formed by General George S. Patton, is created. The base, located in the Mojave Desert in Southern California and the Sonoran Desert in western Arizona, stretched to within 50 miles of Phoenix.
  - June 22: Thunderbird Field #2 opens in nearby Scottsdale. Later renamed Scottsdale Airport.
  - November 26: Black troops from segregated units riot in Phoenix.
  - Japanese-Americans from Phoenix are relocated to internment camps at Sacaton and Poston.
  - Alzona Park is built by the Federal Government as worker housing.
- 1943
  - Camp Papago Park (POW camp) opens in June.
  - Litchfield Naval Air Facility opens.
  - The new airport at Douglas is designated the first international airport in the United States.
- 1944
  - December 23: Great Papago Escape of German prisoners, the largest single escape by POW's in any camp in the United States.
  - St. Monica's Hospital, the first integrated hospital in Phoenix, opens (today known as Phoenix Memorial Hospital).
- 1945
  - Arizona State Teachers College becomes Arizona State College.
  - Mystery Castle is built.
  - Several large factories which were created for war production, begin to close down operations.
- 1946
  - The Arizona State Constitution is amended; Arizona becomes a right-to-work state.
  - Ray Bussey elected mayor.
- 1947
  - October: A fire destroys all but four of Phoenix's electric streetcars. The city begins the process of transitioning to a public bus transit system.
  - The Phoenix Charter Revision Committee is formed. The political group, headed by Barry Goldwater, would dominate city politics in the 1950s.
  - Phoenix Symphony Orchestra is founded.
  - The New York Giants start spring training in Phoenix.
- 1948
  - Motorola opens a research and development center for military electronics.
  - Phoenix Jewish News begins publication.
  - City establishes its first sales tax.
  - KPHO-TV becomes the city's first television station.
  - Barry Goldwater elected to the city council.

=== 1950s ===
- 1950 – Population reaches 106,818, now 99th most populous city in the United States, and the largest in the Southwest.
- 1950s – Widespread use of air conditioning leads to a construction and population boom.
- 1952
  - Wright House (residence) built.
  - Republican Barry Goldwater elected United States Senator, defeating the Senate Majority Leader Ernest McFarland; Republican John Howard Pyle elected governor
  - Arizona Public Service formed by the merger of Central Arizona Light and Power and Northern Arizona Light and Power
  - Racial segregation is banned at Sky Harbor Airport.
  - Adam Diaz becomes the first Hispanic on the city council.
- 1953
  - State courts declare school segregation illegal. Phoenix begins school desegregation.
  - KYTL-TV begins operations as an NBC affiliate. Currently KPNX-TV.
  - Channel 10 begins broadcasting, currently KSAZ-TV, the Fox affiliate.
- 1954 – City finishes the desegregation of Public schools.
- 1955
  - Terminal 1 opens at Sky Harbor Airport, built at a cost of $835,000, it represented the most modern and efficient passenger terminals of its time. It was demolished in 1991.
  - Metropolitan Bus Lines is purchased by L.A. Tanner and renamed Valley Transit Line. Tanner was unsuccessful in his attempts to also purchase the city-run municipal bus system.
  - Phoenix battles Scottsdale over annexation of unincorporated areas. This battle would last until an agreement was reached regarding "spheres of annexation influence" in 1964.
  - KTVK-TV opens operations as an ABC affiliate.
  - Agriculture falls to second behind manufacturing in the city's economy.
  - The city bans segregation in public housing.
- 1957—More annexations
  - Park Central Shopping City in business.
  - Phoenix Towers built.
- 1958
  - Phoenix doubles in size through annexation
  - Numerous shopping centers opened
  - Smog becomes more troublesome
  - Arizona State College becomes Arizona State University.
- 1959
  - Phoenix Art Museum opens.
  - L.A. Tanner is successful in purchasing the city-owned municipal bus system, merging it into his Valley Transit Line. All bus service in the valley is now unified.
  - Sunnyslope annexed by Phoenix.
  - Deer Valley airport opens.

=== 1960s ===
- 1960
  - Phoenix Corporate Center built.
  - Ben Avery Shooting Facility, begun in 1957 and one of the largest publicly operated shooting ranges, opens.
  - During the 1950s, Phoenix annexed 94.86 square miles of land.
  - Phoenix annexes Maryvale and South Phoenix.
  - Population reaches 439,170.
  - Del Webb's Sun City opens.
- 1961
  - Deer Valley is annexed.
  - Chris-Town Mall, the first air-conditioned indoor mall in Phoenix, opens.
  - KAET-TV begins operations as a NET affiliate.
- 1962
  - Phoenix Zoo opens.
  - Phoenix City Square built.
  - City bus drivers participate in an unsuccessful 62-day strike, which precipitates the decline of public transit in Phoenix.
  - Terminal 2 opens at Sky Harbor Airport; passengers served passes the 1 million mark.
  - Arizona Town Hall was established to facilitate semi-annual discussions about topics of major concern to Arizona's future.
- 1963
  - March 13: Phoenix Police arrest Ernesto Miranda without informing him of his rights. This leads to the landmark U.S. Supreme Court case Miranda v. Arizona.
  - Municipal golf course built in Papago Park.
  - Legend City amusement park in business.
  - US Supreme Court upholds Arizona rights to Colorado River water.
- 1964
  - Phoenix Municipal Stadium opens.
  - Barry Goldwater loses the election for President of the United States.
- 1965
  - Arizona Veterans Memorial Coliseum opens.
  - East wing of the Phoenix Art Museum opens, resulting in almost tripling the museum's space.
  - Morrison Warren becomes first black on city council.
- 1966
  - August 9: City council unanimously approves the "Plan for the Phoenix Mountains", thereby creating the Phoenix Mountain Preserve.
  - Valley Transit Line is sold to American Transit Corporation (headquartered in St. Louis, Missouri), and the transit system is renamed Phoenix Transit System.
- 1967 – Regional Maricopa Association of Governments and St. Mary's Food Bank established.
- 1968
  - Phoenix Suns basketball team formed.
  - Phoenix Financial Center is completed.
  - President Lyndon B. Johnson signs a bill approving the Central Arizona Project, to bring water from the Colorado River to central Arizona.
  - Phoenix purchases Goodyear Airport as a general aviation supplement to Sky Harbor.
- 1969
  - Roman Catholic Diocese of Phoenix established.
  - Santa Fe Railway ceases passenger trains to Phoenix in April.
  - City taxes cigarettes and liquor to cover budget shortfall.

=== 1970s ===
- 1970
  - Phoenix New Times newspaper begins publication.
  - Phoenix Mountains Preservation Council founded in August, to purchase all of the 7000 acres in the Phoenix Mountains Preserve, and a total of 9700 acres.
  - Remnants of Tropical Storm Norma slam into city, causing flooding and resulting in 23 deaths.
  - During the 1960s, Phoenix annexed 134.55 square miles of land, now totaling 245.5 square miles.
  - Population reaches 581,562, city becomes the nation's 20th most populous.
- 1971
  - May 1: Amtrak takes over intercity rail routes.
  - First National Bank Plaza, currently known as the Wells Fargo Plaza, is built.
  - The third building, 3838 N. Central Avenue, is built, completing Phoenix City Square.
  - The city purchases the Phoenix Transit System from American Transit, who agrees to continue to manage the operation.
  - The city adopts the Central Phoenix Plan in an attempt to develop the Central Avenue corridor.
  - The first Fiesta Bowl is played.
- 1972
  - Phoenix Symphony Hall opens.
  - Chase Tower built.
  - Salt River floods several times, killing 8.
- 1973 – Voters approve a $23.5 million bond issue, to fund the Phoenix Mountain Preserve.
- 1975
  - Phoenix elects its first female mayor: Margaret Hance.
  - Papago Freeway is passed by the voters.
- 1976
  - Margaret Hance becomes mayor.
  - U.S. Bank Center and Hyatt Regency built.
  - Construction begins on Terminal 3 at Sky Harbor Airport.
  - Tourism moves ahead of agriculture into the number two largest economic sector.
- 1978
  - March 9: Wesley Bolin Memorial Plaza established.
  - Phoenix Transit begins to offer "Dial-a-Ride" services in low-population density areas.
  - Arizona Street Railway Museum opens.
- 1979
  - Terminal 3 at Sky Harbor Airport opens.
  - City adopts the Phoenix Concept 2000 plan, which split the city into urban villages.

=== 1980s ===
- 1980
  - February: Salt River floods, washing away most of the bridges spanning it.
  - 3300 Tower built.

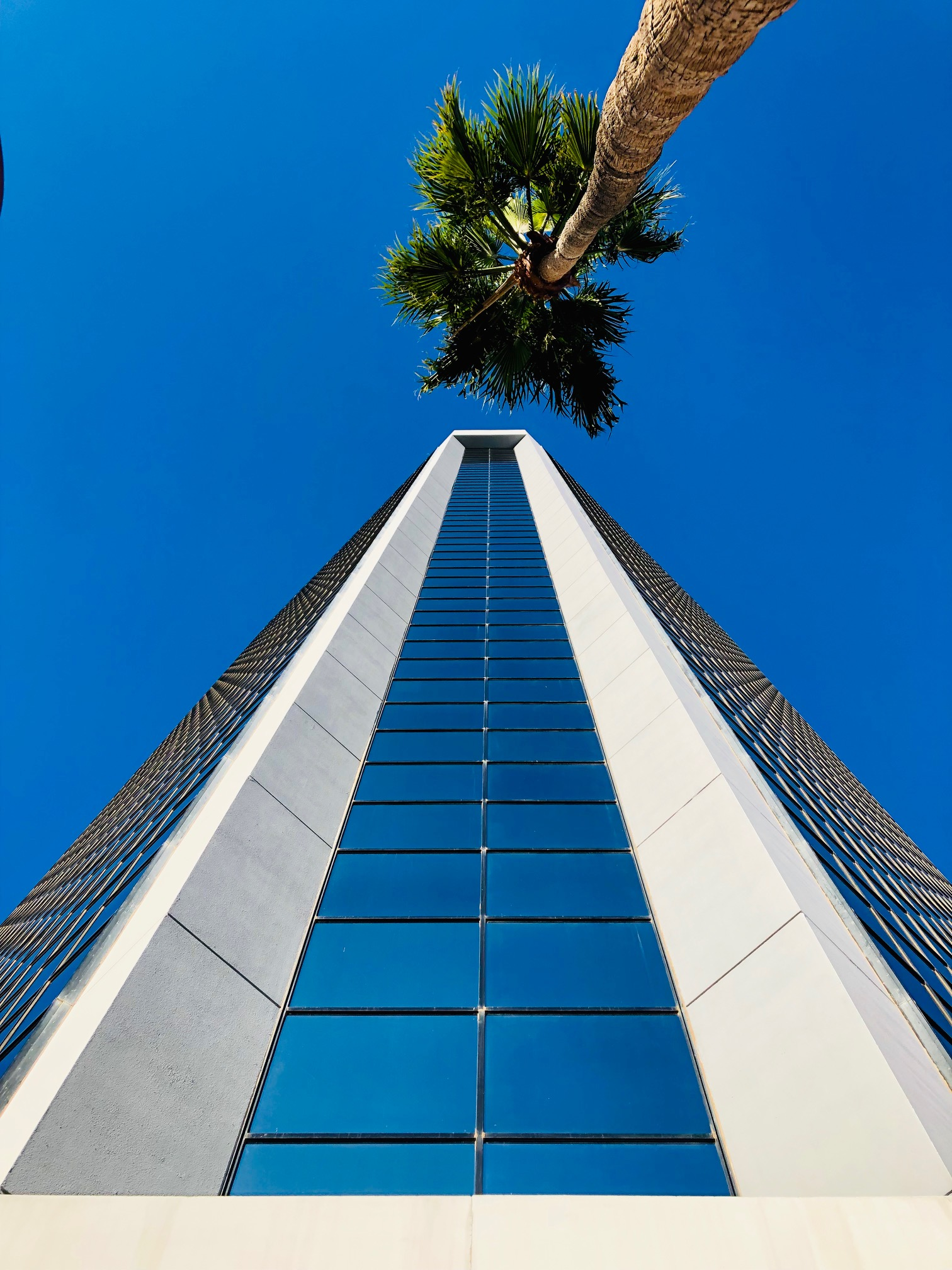
A view up the eastern façade of 3300 Tower, built in 1980

  - During the 1970s, Phoenix annexed 75.53 square miles of land, now totaling 321.03 square miles.
  - Population reaches 789,704
- 1981 – President Ronald Reagan appoints Sandra Day O'Connor to the U.S. Supreme Court.
- 1982 – Voters expand the city council from 6 citywide members to 8 members, each representing a distinct area.
- 1983
  - America West Airlines is formed by valley investors.
  - Terry Goddard elected mayor.
- 1984
  - Arizona State University West campus established by the legislature.
  - Arizona Science Center opens.
  - Deer Valley Petroglyph Preserve opens.
  - The Public Transportation Administration becomes an official department of Phoenix.
- 1985
  - Valley Metro Regional Public Transportation Authority formed, after passage of Proposition 300, tasked to create a regional transit plan and system.
  - Great American Tower built.
  - First water from the Central Arizona Project reaches Maricopa County.
- 1986
  - City urban village divisions created: Ahwatukee Foothills, Alhambra, Camelback East, Central City, Deer Valley, Desert View, Encanto, Estrella, Laveen, Maryvale, North Gateway, North Mountain, Paradise Valley, Rio Vista, and South Mountain.
  - Renaissance Square Tower 1 built.
  - Ballet Arizona headquartered in Phoenix.
  - Palo Verde Nuclear Generating Station opens, with two of three units on-line. It is the largest nuclear power plant (by net generation) in the United States.
- 1987 – The city receives visits from both Pope John Paul II and Mother Teresa.
- 1988
  - Cardinals football team relocates to Phoenix.
  - Telephone Pioneers of America Park, the first barrier-free park in the United States, for disabled Americans, opens.

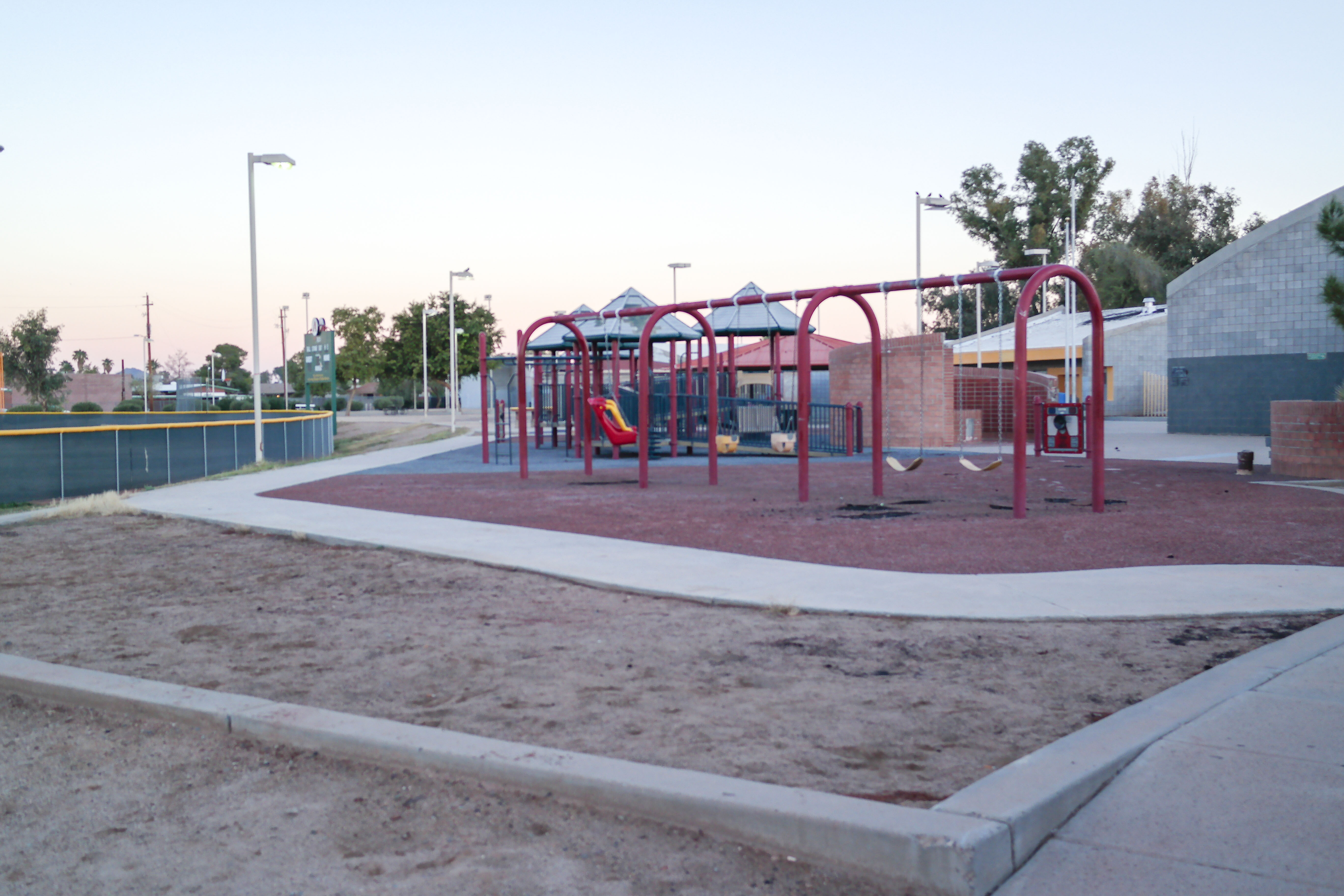
Telephone Pioneers of America Park

- 1989
  - Sunnyslope Historical Society founded.
  - Arizona Center built.
  - Herberger Theater Center (HTC) opens.
  - Voters turn down a $10 billion referendum for a valley-wide rapid transit system, due to the cost and dissatisfaction with the elevated portions of the proposed system.
  - Phoenix Grand Prix is run in Downtown Phoenix in June.

=== 1990s ===
- 1990
  - The Barry Goldwater Terminal (terminal 4) opens at Sky harbor airport with 5 concourses and 44 gates.
  - November 10: The Desert Sky Pavilion (currently named the Ak-Chin Pavilion) opens. Billy Joel is its first act.
  - The Stack (road interchange) and Papago Freeway Tunnel open, completing Interstate 10.
  - During the 1980s, Phoenix annexed 99.33 square miles of land, now totaling 420.36 square miles.
  - Population reaches 983,403.
- 1991
  - Viad Tower built.
  - Phoenix transit implements a Bus Card Plus Program, allowing participants reduced fares.
- 1992
  - America West Arena opens.
  - Bike racks become available on all almost all buses citywide.
  - Joe Arpaio elected Maricopa County Sheriff.
- 1993
  - September 30: Williams Air Force Base closes after 52 years of military service.
  - RPTA adopts the name, Valley Metro, for the regional transit system. Phoenix and Mesa become the first two systems in the valley to agree to the name.
  - City wins the Carl Bertelsmann Prize, for the best run city government in the world.
  - Arpaio creates Tent City, to help alleviate crowding.
  - Salt River floods and destroys the new Mill Avenue Bridge.
  - Steve Benson, a cartoonist for the Arizona Republic, wins the Pulitzer Prize.
- 1994
  - John B. Nelson becomes mayor, succeeded by Thelda Williams and Skip Rimsza.
  - The 20-story Phoenix City Hall opens.
  - Williams Gateway Airport in operation.
  - Low-floor buses are added to the Valley Metro fleet.
- 1995
  - Burton Barr Central Library opens.
  - City website online.
  - Valley Metro becomes the first municipal bus service in the country to accept credit cards.
- 1996
  - Amtrak discontinues service to Phoenix.
  - September 24: Construction begins on a new Central Station for Valley Metro, near Central and Van Buren Avenues.
  - The Phoenix Coyotes begin play in the Western Conference as a relocation franchise previously known as The Winnipeg Jets.
- 1997
  - Hayden Flour Mill, which in the late 1800s supplied most of the flour for the state of Arizona, closes after 123 years.
  - Phoenix Lights, alleged UFO sighting, seen over the city.
- 1998
  - Sixth concourse added to the Barry Goldwater Terminal at Sky Harbor airport.
  - Arizona Diamondbacks begin play in the National League as an expansion team.
  - Bank One Ballpark, currently called Chase Field, opens.
  - Anthem, Arizona, just north of the city, is begun.
- 1999 – Tempe Town Lake is completed.
- 2000
  - Bank of America Tower built.
  - Ro Ho En, the Japanese friendship garden between Phoenix and its sister-city, Himeji City, Japan, opens.
  - Sandra Day O'Connor United States Courthouse opens.
  - During the 1990s, Phoenix annexed 54.79 square miles of land, now totaling 475.15 square miles.
  - Population: 1,321,045.
  - "Transit 2000" proposition passes, approving construction of 24 miles of light rail with Phoenix city limits, named Valley Metro Rail.
  - Tempe city council passes motion approving an additional 5 miles of light rail to be constructed and linked to the Valley Metro Rail system.

== 21st century ==
=== 2000s ===
- 2001
  - Glendale voters approve a sales tax increase to fund transportation improvements, including 5 miles of light rail to connect with the Metro Light Rail.
  - Arizona Diamondbacks defeat the New York Yankees in the World Series.
- 2002 – Comerica Theatre opens.
- 2003
  - Construction begins on Metro Light Rail.
  - Arizona Roller Derby headquartered in city.
  - Jobing.com Arena, currently known as the Gila River Arena, opens.
- 2004
  - Phil Gordon becomes mayor.
  - Maricopa County voters approve a 20-year continuation of the 1985 sales tax to fund transportation needs. The plan includes almost $25 billion in funding for: freeways, bus transit expansion, light rail, city streets, and bike and pedestrian paths.
  - The Translational Genomics Research Institute opens in downtown Phoenix.
  - Mini Stack (road interchange) built.
- 2005
  - The seventh concourse is added to the Barry Goldwater Terminal at Sky Harbor airport, bringing the total number of gates in the terminal to 84.
  - America West and US Airlines merge, creating the nation's fifth-largest airline.
- 2006
  - Phoenix Metropolitan Opera founded.
  - Phoenix Art Museum expansion, which includes a wing for modern art and a sculpture garden, opens.
  - Cardinals Stadium, now State Farm Stadium opens.
  - Phoenix-Mesa Gateway Airport begins operations on the site of the closed Williams AFB.
- 2007
  - July 27: News helicopter collision.
  - Phoenix Mercury win the WNBA championship.
- 2008
  - Valley Metro Rail begins operation.
  - 44 Monroe built.
  - Super Bowl XLII played at University of Phoenix Stadium. The New York Giants defeat the New England Patriots.
  - Squaw Peak renamed Piestewa Peak, in honor of the first Native American woman killed in combat, Lori Piestewa.
- 2009
  - Phoenix Civic Space Park opens.
  - Sculpture Her Secret Is Patience installed.
  - Freeport-McMoRan Center built.
  - Arizona Cardinals lose to the Pittsburgh Steelers in Super Bowl XLIII.

=== 2010s ===
- 2010
  - The Musical Instrument Museum, the largest museum of its type in the world, opens.
  - Tempe Town Lake dam bursts.
  - Population: 1,445,632; metro 4,192,887.
- 2011
  - July 5: Sandstorm.
  - University of Arizona's Center for Social Cohesion active.
- 2012
  - Greg Stanton becomes mayor.
  - CityScape building constructed.
- 2013 – Population: 1,513,367.
- 2015
  - Renovations begin on Terminal 3 at Sky Harbor airport, part of a 3-phase redevelopment of the terminal expected to be completed in 2020.
  - Super Bowl XLIX played at University of Phoenix Stadium. The New England Patriots defeat the Seattle Seahawks.
- 2017
  - In June 2017, a heat wave grounded more than 40 airline flights of small aircraft, with American Airlines reducing sales on certain flights to prevent the vehicles from being over the maximum weight permitted for safe takeoff.
- 2019
  - Kate Gallego becomes mayor.
- 2021
  - On November 9, 2021, Gulfstream Aerospace Corporation announced that the airport would be the site for the West Coast Service Center Maintenance, Repair and Overhaul (MRO) facility. The new 225,000-square-foot facility, a more than $70 million investment.
- 2022
  - The new hangar is located at the SkyBridge development at the airport and augments hangar space Gulfstream established at the facility in March 2022.

== See also ==
- History of Phoenix, Arizona
- List of mayors of Phoenix
- National Register of Historic Places listings in Phoenix, Arizona
- Phoenix metropolitan area
- List of radio stations in Phoenix
- Timeline of Arizona
- Timelines of other cities in Arizona: Mesa, Tucson

== Bibliography ==
Published in 19th century

- "Phoenix P.O.", Arizona Business Directory and Gazetteer, San Francisco: W.C. Disturnell, 1881
- Patrick Hamilton (1881), "Chief Towns: Phoenix", Resources of Arizona, Prescott, Ariz

Published in 20th century

- Maricopa County (Ariz.). Board of Supervisors (1908), "Phoenix", Salt River Valley, Arizona, offers productive lands, a healthful climate and rare opportunities to the investor and homeseeker, New York: Norman Pierce Co., OCLC 16818598
- "Phoenix (Arizona)" . Encyclopædia Britannica. Vol. 21 (11th ed.). 1910. p. 458.
- George Wharton James (1917), "Phoenix and Salt River Valley", Arizona, the Wonderland, Boston: Page Company
- Federal Writers’ Project (1966). "Phoenix". Arizona, the Grand Canyon State. American Guide Series (4th ed.). New York: Hastings House. p. 216+. OL 5989725M.
- James E. Buchanan (1978), Howard B. Furer (ed.), Phoenix: a chronological & documentary history, 1865–1976, American Cities Chronology Series, Dobbs Ferry, N.Y.: Oceana Publications, ISBN 0379006170
- Lykes, Aimee de Potter. "A Hundred Beers of Phoenix History", in G. Wesley Johnson, Jr., ed. Phoenix in the Twentieth Century: Essays in Community History (1993) pp. 220–236, to 1981

Published in 21st century

- Gober, Patricia (2006). Metropolitan Phoenix. University of Pennsylvania Press. ISBN 978-0-8122-3899-0.
- Grady, Patrick (2012). Out Of The Ruins. Arizona Pioneer Press. ISBN 978-0-615-55511-9.
- "Arizona: Territorial, statehood timelines". The Arizona Republic. June 24, 2011.
- Richard Nilsen (August 2011). "Timeline: Postwar, 1946–80". AZCentral.com.
- American Cities Project (2013). "Phoenix". America's Big Cities in Volatile Times: City Profiles. Washington, D.C.: Pew Charitable Trusts.
- Joseph Galaskiewicz; et al. (2013). "Studying the role of nonprofits, government, and business in providing activities and services to youth in the Phoenix Metropolitan Area". In Mario Luis Small; et al. (eds.). Reconsidering the Urban Disadvantaged: The Role of Systems, Institutions, and Organizations. Sage. ISBN 978-1-4833-0656-8.
- VanderMeer, Philip (2010). Desert Visions and the Making of Phoenix. University of New Mexico Press. ISBN 978-0-8263-4891-3.
- Whitaker, Matthew C. (2009). "Great expectations: African American and Latino relations in Phoenix since World War II". In Kenneth L. Kusmer and Joe W. Trotter (ed.). African American Urban History since World War II. Historical Studies of Urban America. University of Chicago Press. ISBN 978-0-226-46512-8.
