= Timeline of Tucson, Arizona =

Coordinates: 32.222°N 110.926°W

The following is a timeline of the history of the city of Tucson, Arizona, U.S.

== 18th century ==
- 1732 – Mission San Xavier del Bac founded by Jesuits near present-day Tucson.
- 1776 – Presidio San Augustin del Tucson (military outpost) established.
- 1779 – December 6: First Battle of Tucson.
- 1782
  - May 1: Second Battle of Tucson.
  - December 25: Third Battle of Tucson (1782).
- 1784 – March 21: Fourth Battle of Tucson, Sonora, New Spain.

== 19th century ==
- 1846 – December 16: Capture of Tucson, Sonora, Mexico, by United States forces.
- 1848 – Population: 760.
- 1853 – Territory becomes part of the United States per Gadsden Purchase.
- 1856 – August 29: Conference held to organize Arizona Territory.
- 1857 – San Antonio-San Diego Mail Line in operation.
- 1862
  - February: Tucson occupied by Confederate forces.
  - May 20: Capture of Tucson by Union forces.
- 1863 – Tully, Ochoa & Co. merchandisers in business.
- 1866 – L. Zechendorf & Co. merchandisers in business.
- 1867 – Tucson becomes capital of Arizona Territory.
- 1869 – St. Augustine Roman Catholic Church built.
- 1870
  - Arizona Citizen newspaper begins publication.
  - J.S. Mansfield news depot in business.
- 1872
  - Public School department organized.
  - Population: 3,500 (estimate).
- 1873
  - San Diego-Tucson telegraph begins operating (approximate date).
  - Fort Lowell built near Tucson.
- 1875 – Estevan Ochoa elected mayor.
- 1876 – Pie Allen becomes mayor.
- 1877 – Town incorporated.
- 1878 – El Fronterizo newspaper begins publication.
- 1879
  - Arizona Daily Star newspaper begins publication.
  - Presbyterian Church built.
- 1880
  - Southern Pacific Railroad begins operating.
  - Tucson Library Association organized.
  - St. Mary's Hospital opens near town.
  - Population: 7,007.
- 1881
  - Atchison, Topeka and Santa Fe railroad begins operating.
  - Methodist Church built.
- 1882 – March 20: Wyatt Earp kills Frank Stilwell.
- 1883 – City chartered. Townsite is bounded by Speedway Boulevard on the north, 22nd Street on the south, 1st Avenue on the east, & on the west by Main Avenue from north of 18th Street, & 10th Avenue from south of 18th Street.
- 1885 – The first public park in Tucson known as Carrillo's Gardens is built by Leopoldo Carrillo.
- 1890 – Population: 5,150.
- 1891 – University of Arizona opens per Morrill Act; Old Main, University of Arizona built.
- 1893 – Arizona State Museum established.
- 1897 – Roman Catholic Diocese of Tucson established; Cathedral of Saint Augustine (Tucson) built.
- 1900 – Population: 7,531.

== 20th century ==
- 1903 – Desert Laboratory founded.
- 1907 – Southern Pacific railway station built.
- 1910 – Population: 13,193.
- 1912 – City becomes part of new State of Arizona.
- 1919
  - City airfield established.
  - Hotel Congress in business.
- 1920 – Rialto Theatre (Arizona) opens.
- 1927
  - Charles Lindbergh visits city.
  - Temple of Music & Art built.
- 1928 – James A. Walsh United States Courthouse built.
- 1929
  - Pima County Courthouse and Consolidated National Bank building constructed.
  - Pioneer Hotel in business.
- 1930
  - Fox Tucson Theatre and Plaza Theater (Tucson) open.
  - Arizona Inn built.
- 1933 – Henry Jaastad becomes mayor.
- 1940
  - Tucson Army Air Field established.
  - South Tucson incorporates as a city.
- 1941 – Davis–Monthan Air Force Base established.
- 1950 – Catalina Highway constructed.
- 1952 – Arizona-Sonora Desert Museum founded.
- 1954 – Hirsh's Shoes (shop) built.
- 1955
  - Don Hummel becomes mayor.
  - Southern Pacific 1673 train exhibit opens.
- 1956 – Tucson Air National Guard Base active.
- 1960
  - University of Arizona Poetry Center founded.
  - Old Tucson Studios theme park and El Con Mall in business.
- 1962 – Phoenix Title Building constructed.
- 1963 – Tucson International Airport begins operating.
- 1964 – Tucson Botanical Gardens founded.
- 1965 – DeGrazia Gallery built.
- 1967
  - University of Arizona College of Medicine and Reid Park Zoo founded.
  - Jim Corbett (politician) becomes mayor.
  - Tucson Federal Savings & Loan Association Building constructed.
- 1969 – Pima Community College established.
- 1971
  - Tucson Opera Company and Food Conspiracy Co-op founded.
  - Tucson Community Center built.
- 1972 – Planetary Science Institute founded.
- 1975 – Center for Creative Photography established.
- 1976 – Tucson Community Food Bank and Pima Air & Space Museum established.
- 1977 – Bank of America Plaza (Tucson) built.
- 1978 – Arizona State Prison Complex – Tucson in operation.
- 1982
  - Federal Correctional Institution, Tucson in operation.
  - Tucson Mall and Casas Adobes Foothills Mall (Arizona) in business.
- 1984 – Channel 12 government access TV begins broadcasting (approximate date).
- 1985 – Tucson Historic Preservation Foundation established.
- 1986 – One South Church built.
- 1987 – Thomas Volgy becomes mayor.
- 1990 – Population: 405,390.
- 1991
  - Biosphere 2 built.
  - George Miller (Arizona politician) becomes mayor.
- 1996
  - Goodricke-Pigott Observatory dedicated.
  - Museum of Contemporary Art, Tucson founded.
- 1998
  - City website online (approximate date).
  - Park Place (Tucson, Arizona) shopping mall in business.
- 1999 – Bob Walkup becomes mayor.

== 21st century ==
- 2001 – Anselmo Valencia Tori Amphitheater opens.
- 2004
  - La Encantada shopping center in business.
  - October 5: Murder of Brian Stidham.
- 2005
  - Jewish History Museum (Tucson) established.
  - Southern Arizona Transportation Museum dedicated.
- 2007 - United States Penitentiary, Tucson in operation.
- 2010
  - Con-Nichiwa anime convention begins.
  - Population: 520,116.
- 2011
  - January 8: Shooting of U.S. Representative Gabby Giffords and eighteen others in Casas Adobes.
  - January 12: Barack Obama Tucson memorial speech.
  - May 5: Jose Guerena shooting.
  - November 8: Tucson mayoral election, 2011.
  - December 5: Jonathan Rothschild becomes mayor.
  - Casino Del Sol Hotel Tower and UniSource Energy Building constructed.
- 2013 – Armed Citizens Project active.

== See also ==
- History of Tucson, Arizona
- National Register of Historic Places listings in Pima County, Arizona
- List of television stations in Tucson
- List of tallest buildings in Tucson
- Timeline of Arizona
- Timelines of other cities in Arizona: Mesa, Phoenix

== Bibliography ==
Published in 19th century

- Directory of the City of Tucson. San Francisco: G.W. Barter. 1881.
- "Tucson P.O.", Arizona Business Directory and Gazetteer, San Francisco: W.C. Disturnell, 1881
- Patrick Hamilton (1881), "Chief Towns: Tucson", Resources of Arizona, Prescott, Ariz
- Tucson and Tombstone General and Business Directory, for 1883 and 1884. 1883.
- "Tucson" . Encyclopædia Britannica. Vol. 23 (9th ed.). 1888. p. 604.
- "(Tucson)", Appletons' General Guide to the United States and Canada: Western and Southern States, New York: D. Appleton and Company, 1889

Published in 20th century

- "Tucson" . Encyclopædia Britannica. Vol. 27 (11th ed.). 1910. pp. 361–362.
- Estelle M. Buehman (1911), Old Tucson: a hop, skip and jump history from 1539 Indian settlement to new and greater Tucson, Tucson, Ariz: State Consolidated Publishing Co., OCLC 12268599, OL 6530481M
- George Wharton James (1917), "Old – Tucson – New", Arizona, the Wonderland, Boston: Page Company
- "Tucson, Arizona". Automobile Blue Book. New York: Automobile Blue Book Publishing Co. 1919.
- Federal Writers’ Project (1966). "Tucson". Arizona, the Grand Canyon State. American Guide Series (4th ed.). New York: Hastings House. p. 252+. OL 5989725M.
- Rob Rachowiecki (1995), "Southeastern Arizona: Tucson", Southwest, Lonely Planet, OL 24220208M
