= Sun Valley High School (Arizona) =

Coordinates: 33.394730°N 111.771038°W

Location
- 1143 S. Lindsay Rd. Mesa, Arizona 85204; United States

Information
- School type: Public charter high school
- Established: 1996
- Principal: Jenni Kincaid
- Grades: 9-12
- Enrollment: 351 (2023–2024)
- Colors: Yellow, dark green
- Mascot: Dragons
- Accreditation: North Central Association

Sun Valley High School is a public charter high school in Mesa, Arizona. It is operated by The Leona Group. In the 2009-11 conference and region alignment from the Arizona Interscholastic Association, its 813 students at the time made it the largest of the associate members (which included several other Leona schools).
