= Jewish News of Greater Phoenix =

Newspaper in Phoenix, Arizona

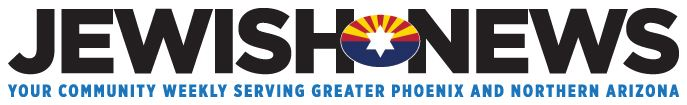
- Jewish News (AZ) logo
- Type: Weekly newspaper
- Owner: Phoenix Jewish News Inc.
- Editor: Mala Blomquist
- General manager: Rich Solomon
- Founded: 1948
- Headquarters: 1625 East Northern Avenue, Phoenix, Arizona
- Circulation: 5,950 (as of 2010)
- ISSN: 1070-5848
- Website: jewishaz.com

Jewish News of Greater Phoenix is an independent weekly Jewish newspaper published in Phoenix, Arizona. The newspaper reports on local, national, and international stories of interest to the Jewish community in metropolitan Phoenix.

== History ==
The newspaper published its first issue on January 15, 1948, under the name The Phoenix Jewish News. It was distributed at the time by the Jewish Community Council, which preceded the Jewish Federation of Greater Phoenix.

In December 1948, M.B. "Bud" Goldman and Joseph S. Stocker became co-publishers. They changed the paper from a monthly to a biweekly format.

Cecil and Pearl Newmark (who had come to Arizona in 1946) purchased the newspaper in 1961, and owned and operated it until 1981. In 1981, they sold it to their daughter Florence (Flo) Eckstein (who serves as its editor and publisher) and her husband, Paul. In 1984, it became a weekly newspaper, and its average issue size became 48 pages. In 1988 the newspaper introduced an annual Community Directory, and the newspaper's web site, jewishaz.com, went live in 1996. In 2007, it began publishing a full-color glossy magazine, named Chosen.

It has operated under the name Phoenix Jewish News from 1948 until 1986, under the name Greater Phoenix Jewish News from 1986 until 1993, and under its current name from 1993 to present.

Phoenix Mayor Phil Gordon declared May 18, 2008, "Jewish News of Greater Phoenix Day" in honor of the newspaper's "exemplary service to the community and the Jewish people". On May 18, 2009, the Arizona Chapter of the American Jewish Committee presented the newspaper with the RosaLee Shluker Community Service Award in honor of its 60th anniversary.

As of 2008, the newspaper had 21 staff members. It serves a Jewish community estimated at more than 100,000. In 2010, the newspaper had a paid circulation of 5,950, which was the sixth-largest page circulation of any Phoenix newspaper.
