= I.d.e.a. Museum =

Art museum in Maricopa County, Arizona

i.d.e.a. Museum
- imagination, design, experience, art

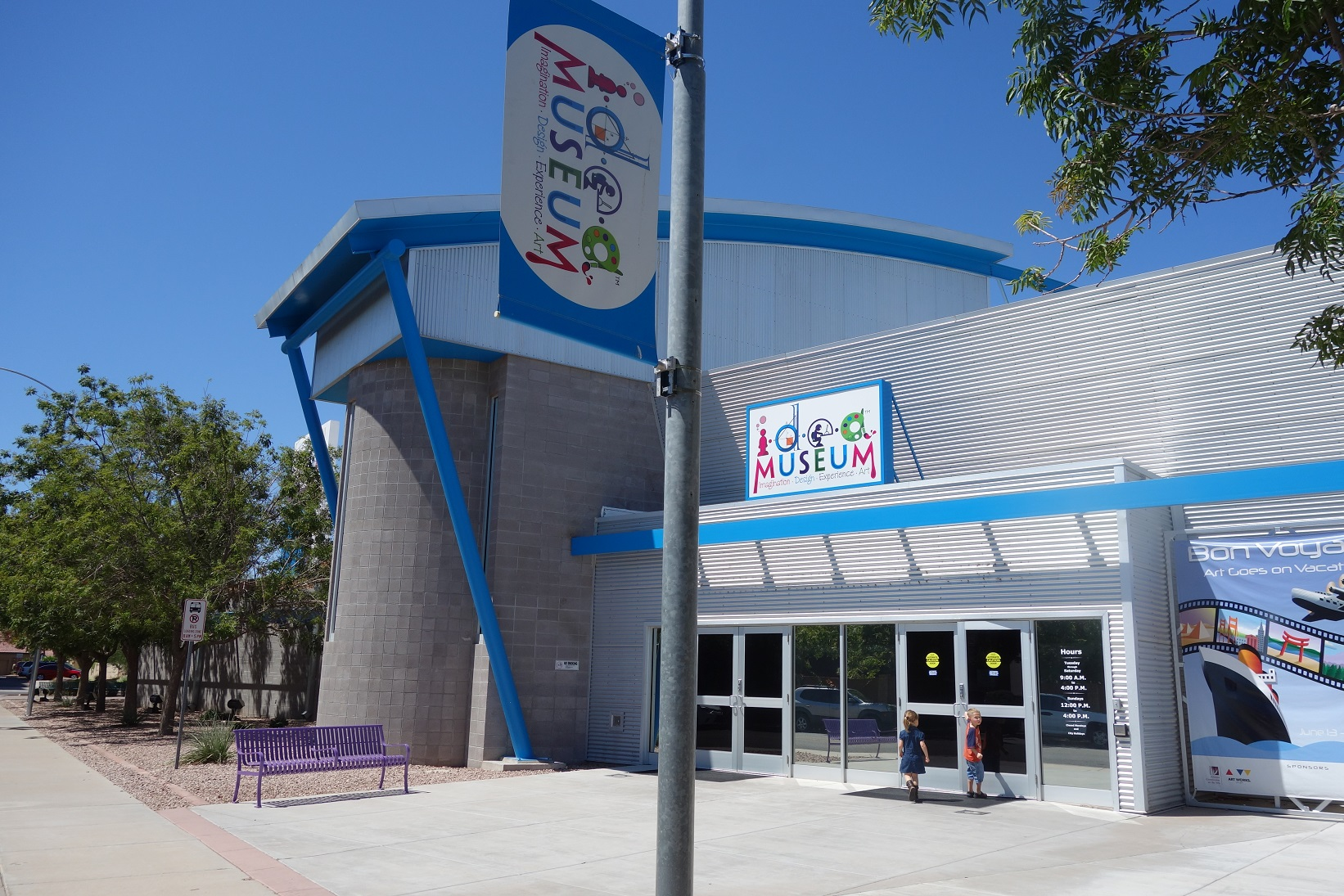
- Front entrance of museum
- Former name: Arizona Museum for Youth
- Established: 1978
- Location: 150 West Pepper Place; Mesa, Arizona 85201 USA
- Coordinates: 33.4166°N 111.8360°W
- Type: Children's museum
- Visitors: 126,000 (2023)
- Founder: John O. Whiteman
- Director: Jarrad Bittner
- Chairperson: Allyn Bransby
- Website: ideamuseum.org

The i.d.e.a. Museum, formerly the Arizona Museum for Youth, is a museum designed for exhibiting, teaching, and interacting with the fine arts. It changed its name on February 6, 2014, to i.d.e.a., which stands for "imagination, design, experience, art." The i.d.e.a. Museum is primarily designed for younger age groups but has exhibits, classes and activities designed for all age groups. As part of the exhibits, art classes, workshops and family programs are available to teach art principles and techniques. The i.d.e.a. Museum is run and operated by the City of Mesa, Arizona and is located at 150 Pepper Place in downtown Mesa.

== History ==
The museum received its 501(c)(3) status in 1978 and was incorporated after several years in the preliminary development phase, bringing the dream of valley philanthropists Jack and John Whiteman to life. The museum was founded in 1980 as the only children's museum in the United States with a focus on fine art. In 1987, the Arizona Museum for Youth became a public/private partnership between the City of Mesa and the Arizona Museum for Youth Friends, Incorporated. In 2024, the facility closed for several montsh for widespread renovations.

== Activities ==
Housed in a refurbished 1950s grocery store, the museum contains over 20,000 feet of public exhibition space featuring the Whiteman Family Exhibit Gallery, ArtVille, The HUB gallery, the Snackery, and three classrooms. The exhibit gallery showcases new exhibitions several times a year featuring artworks that reflect a chosen topic or theme. The HUB gallery is a space that has engaging art activities for all ages to participate in such as building with recyclable materials, creating art on a dry erase marker wall, making contraptions with the Rigamajig, and more. ArtVille is a permanent exhibition and activity area, especially tailored for children 0 – 4 years of age as a small town environment. The museum strives to provide an alternative to screen time.

Fine arts workshops are presented year-round for children between the ages of 6 months and 12 years. Family programs, summer camps, Girl Scout Badge classes, and special Saturday drop-in workshops are also offered that focuses on art and the museum's exhibitions. The three spaces are also used during school tours for related art activities led by trained Gallery Educators.
