= Mesa Central High School =

Defunct high school in Arizona, United States

- Mesa, Arizona; United States

Information
- Established: 1972
- Closed: 1991

Mesa Central High School, known as Mesa Vo-Tech High School after 1984, was a high school in Mesa, Arizona. It originally served as the district's alternative high school prior to the conversion into a vocational education school in 1980. It closed in 1991 as a consequence of consolidation into the East Valley Institute of Technology joint technological education district.

== History ==
The school's location at 260 South Center Street was the original location of Mesa High School. After the fire that burned down the school's Old Main in 1967, the Mesa Union High School District (high school predecessor to Mesa Public Schools) eventually built a new Mesa High School at 1630 East Southern Avenue.

Mesa Central opened in 1972 as the alternative high school for the district, though as the 1970s wore on it was shifted to serving as the vocational and industrial school in the district. The renamed Mesa Central Vocational-Technical Center, along with some renovations to the campus, opened in 1980. In 1984, the name was shortened to Mesa Vo-Tech High School.

In 1990 the state of Arizona created the concept of joint technological education districts which allowed school districts to pool resources and support a combined vocational-technical infrastructure. The East Valley Institute of Technology started up in the fall of 1991 with its main campus at 1601 West Main Street.
