= Dobson Ranch, Mesa =

Planned community in Mesa, Arizona, US

Coordinates: 33°22′26″N 111°52′19″W

Dobson Ranch is a planned community in Mesa, Arizona. It was built between 1973 and 1999 on and around the site of a homestead that was purchased from the Dobson family by the City of Mesa. The community, which is characterized by a golf course and several small man-made lakes, is bordered by the US 60 to the north, the 101 to the west, Guadalupe Road to the south, and Extension Road to the east.
