= Encanto, Phoenix, Arizona =

Encanto
- Urban village of Phoenix, Arizona
- Encanto Village
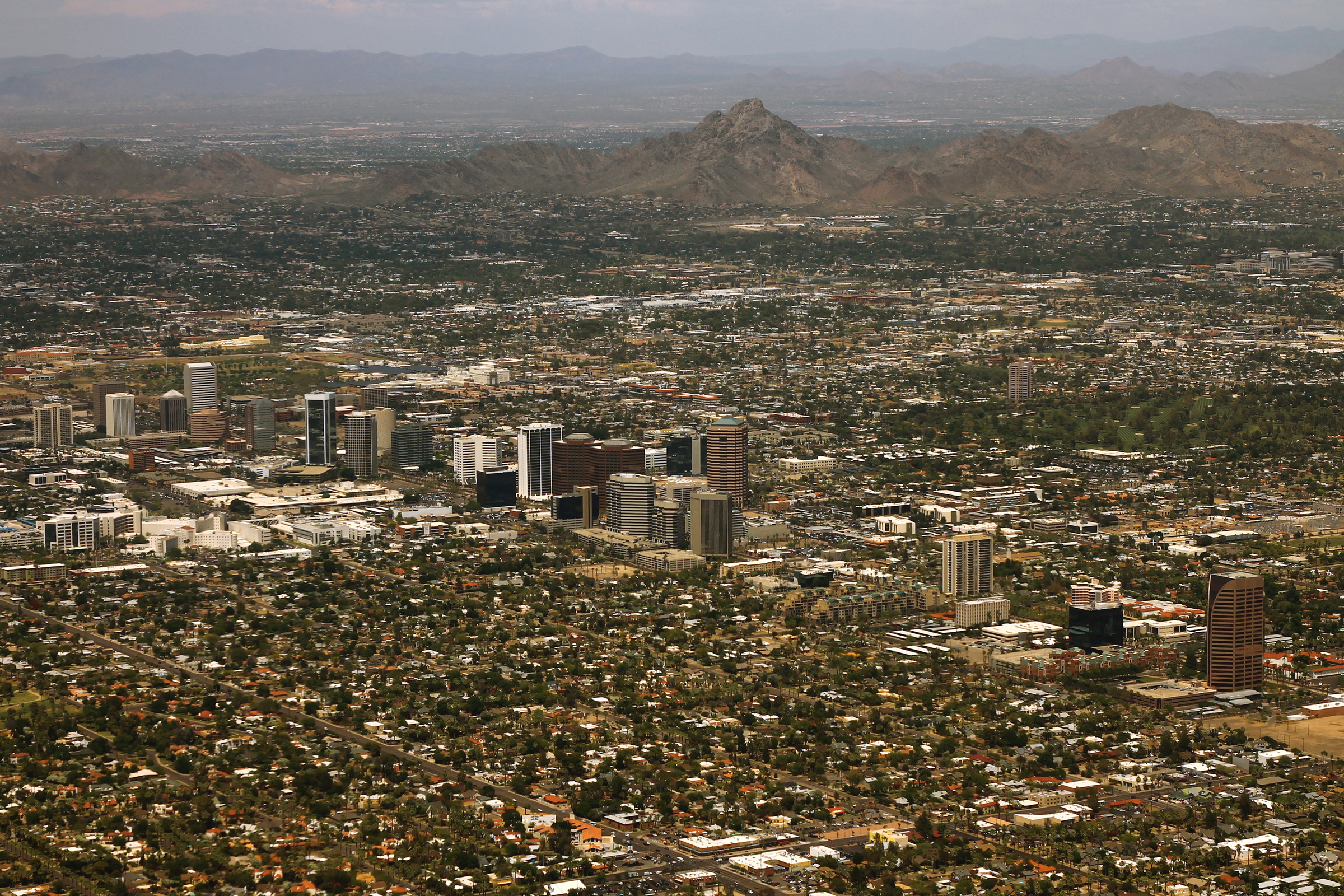
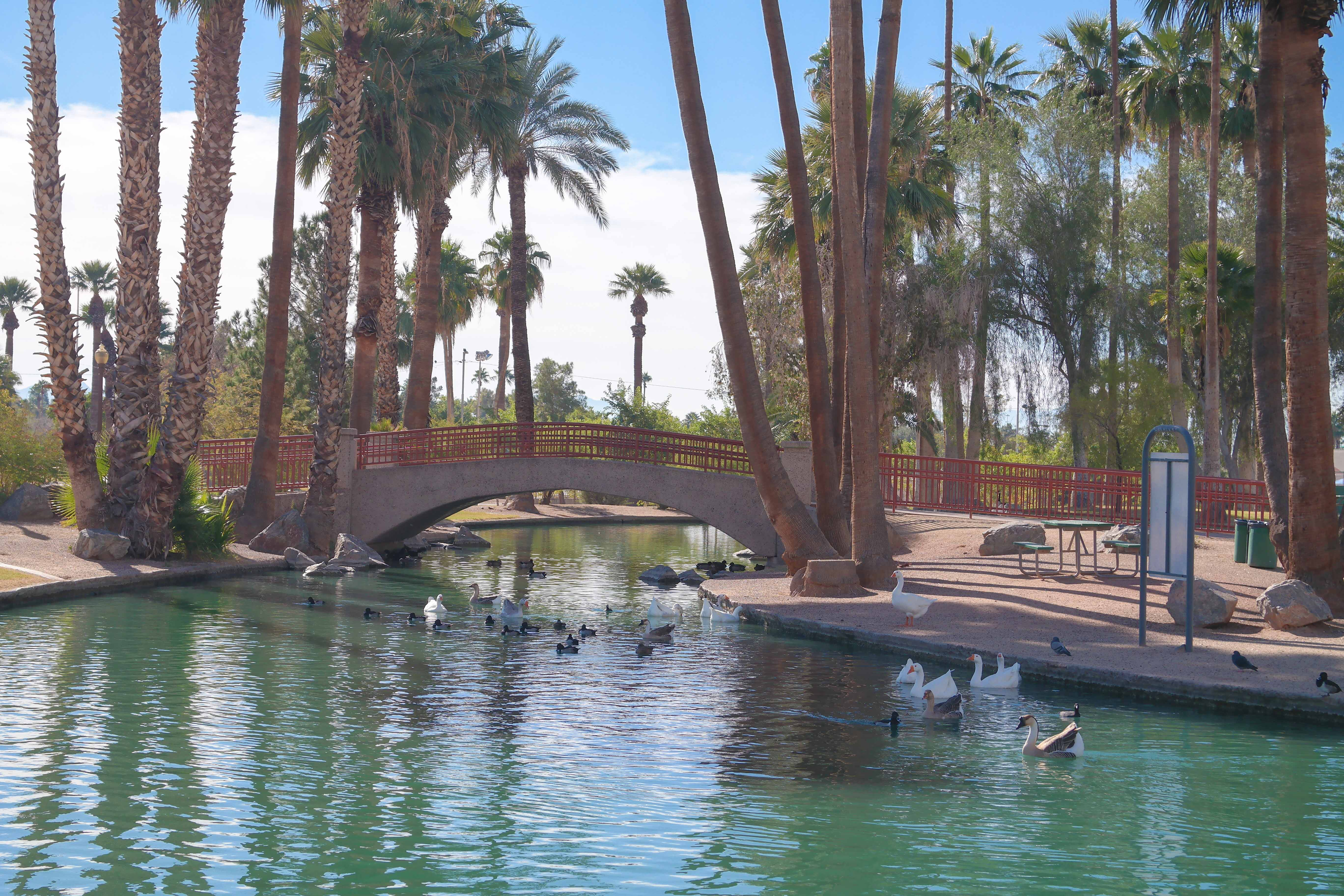
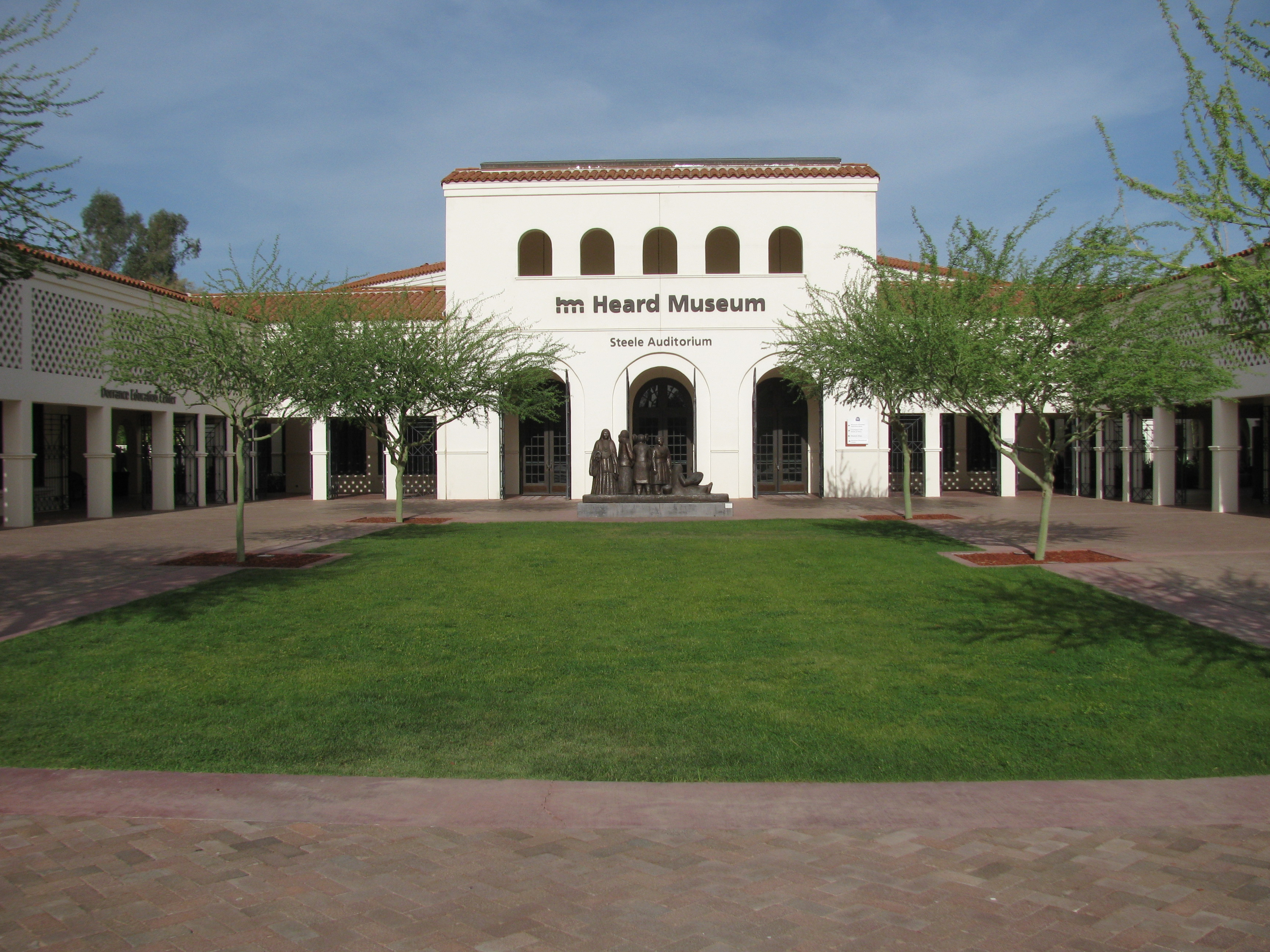
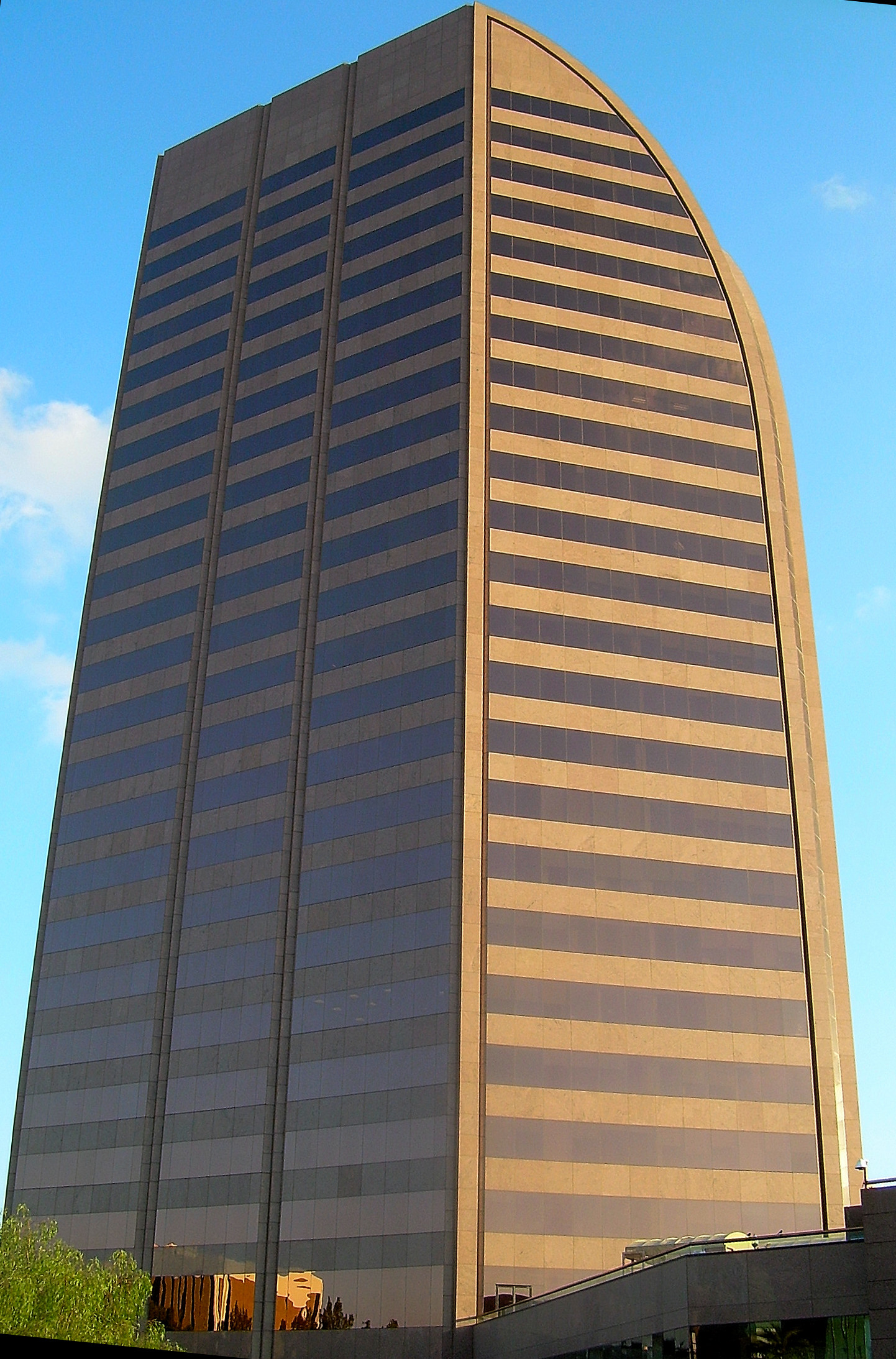
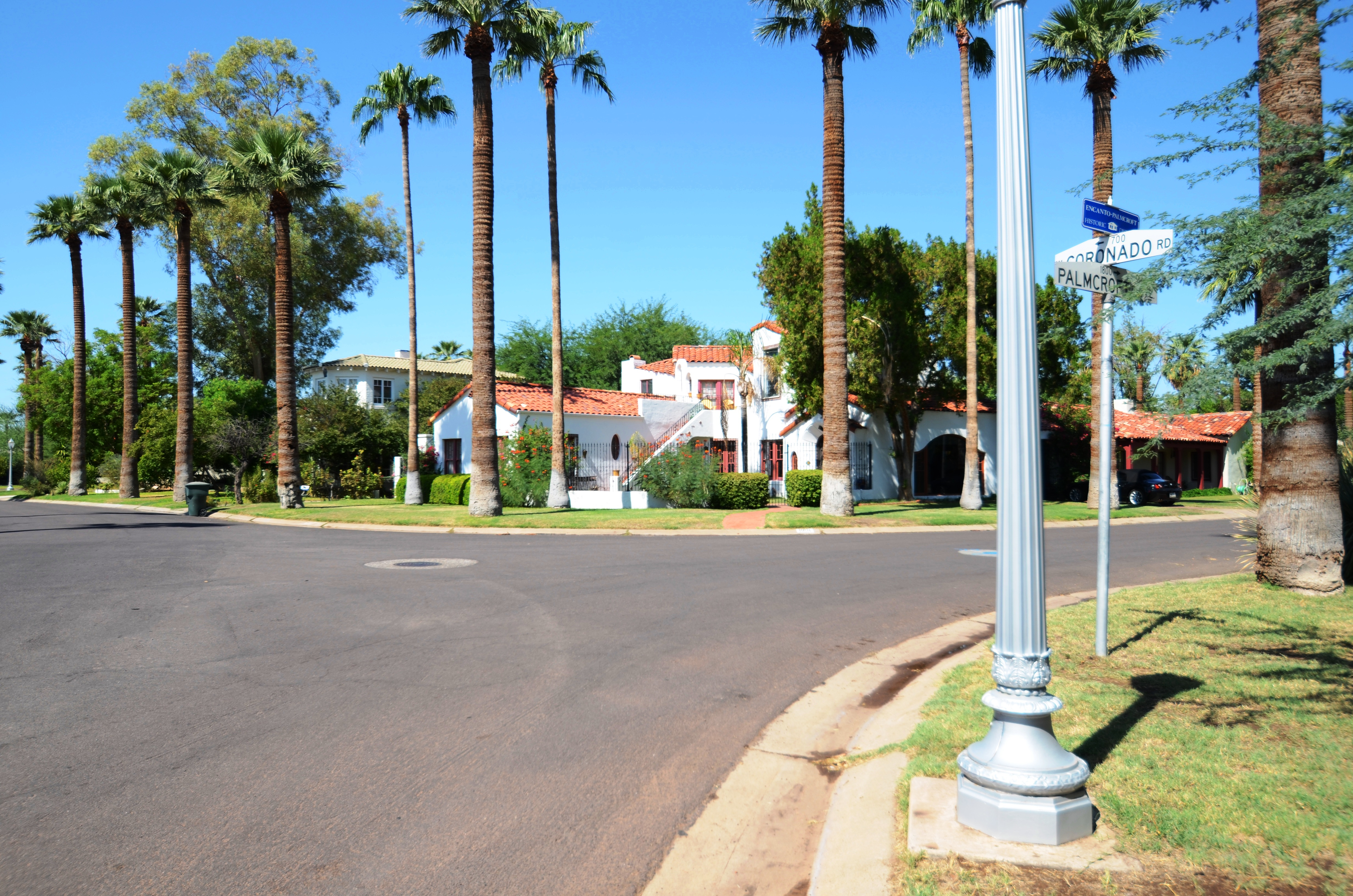
- Midtown Phoenix skyline from an airplane Encanto Park Heard Museum Viad Tower Encanto-Palmcroft Historic District

- Location of Encanto highlighted in red.
- Coordinates: 33°28′33″N 112°05′21″W
- Country: United States
- State: Arizona
- County: Maricopa
- City: Phoenix

Area
  - Total: 8 sq mi (21 km^{2})

Population (2010)
  - Total: 54,614
  - Density: 6,800/sq mi (2,600/km^{2})
- Website: Encanto Village Planning Committee

Encanto Village is one of the 15 Urban villages that make up the City of Phoenix, in Arizona. The village, centered along Central Avenue, is home to the popular Midtown and Melrose Districts, as well as many historic neighborhoods, including Encanto, its namesake. As of 2010, Encanto had a population of 54,614 residents.

== Geography ==
The community is located in Central Phoenix. At about 8 square miles, it is the city's smallest urban village by area, and, consequently, one of its densest.

The western border of the village is the I-17 Black Canyon Freeway, and the southern border is McDowell Road. The Grand Canal makes up the northern and eastern border.

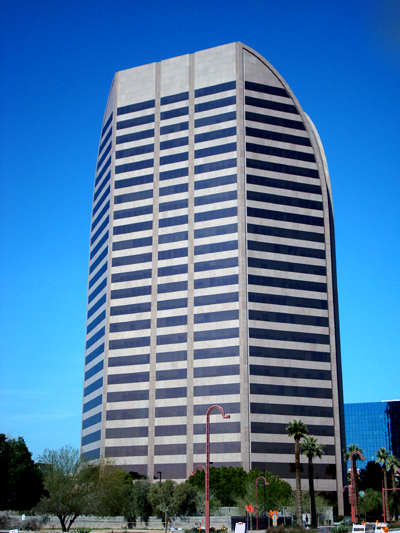
Viad Tower, a prominent structure in the skyline of Phoenix, is located in Encanto Village

== Features ==
The core of the Encanto Village is the Park Central Mall; and the Arizona State Fair, on whose fairgrounds the Arizona Veterans Memorial Coliseum is located. It was the original home of the Phoenix Suns, the city's NBA franchise. Other points of interest include Encanto Park, Steele Indian School Park, Heard Museum, Phoenix Art Museum and Phoenix College.

The village includes the city's Midtown and Uptown districts, which, combined with nearby Downtown, make up the largest center of employment in the state of Arizona. Encanto also includes the southern portion of the Melrose District (with the northern portion in neighboring Alhambra), which has an increasing number of gay and lesbian bars.

== Transportation ==
Encanto Village is served by Valley Metro Rail, with 4 stops located within the boundaries of the village, Thomas/Central Avenue station, Osborn/Central Avenue station, Indian School/Central Avenue station, and Campbell/Central Avenue station

== Historic Neighborhoods ==
Encanto village contains a majority of the city of Phoenix residential historic districts with 21 of the 36 districts falling within its boundaries.

- Ashland Place
- Alvarado
- Campus Vista
- Cheery Lynn
- Coronado
- Country Club Park
- Del Norte Place
- East Alvarado
- Earll Place
- Encanto-Palmcroft
- Encanto Manor
- Fairview Place
- Idylwilde Park
- La Hacienda
- Los Olivos
- Margarita Place
- North Encanto
- Willo
- Woodlea
- Villa Verde
- Yaple Park
