= Transportation in Arizona =

Overview
- Transit type: Rapid transit, commuter rail, buses, private automobile, taxicab, bicycle, pedestrian

Operation
- Operator: Arizona Department of Transportation

The transportation system of Arizona comprises car, rail, air, bus, and bicycle transport.

== Transit systems ==
=== Rail ===
Amtrak operates the Southwest Chief, Sunset Limited, and Texas Eagle through Arizona. Two Amtrak routes serve Arizona communities: the Southwest Chief passes through Winslow, Flagstaff, and Kingman, while the Texas Eagle passes through Benson, Tucson, Maricopa and Yuma. Although the Texas Eagle passes much closer to Phoenix than the Southwest Chief does, Phoenix is linked to the Amtrak system via motorcoach from Flagstaff.

A light rail system called Valley Metro Rail opened in December 2008, connecting Phoenix with the nearby cities of Tempe and Mesa, with plans for expansion in the future.

=== Bus ===
The Phoenix and Tucson metropolitan areas are served by public bus transit systems. Yuma and Flagstaff have public bus systems. Greyhound Lines serves Phoenix, Tucson, Flagstaff, Yuma, and several smaller communities statewide. The Navajo Transit System operates bus routes throughout the Navajo Nation and connects Flagstaff to the capital of the Navajo Nation, Window Rock and connections to New Mexico.

== Roads and freeways ==
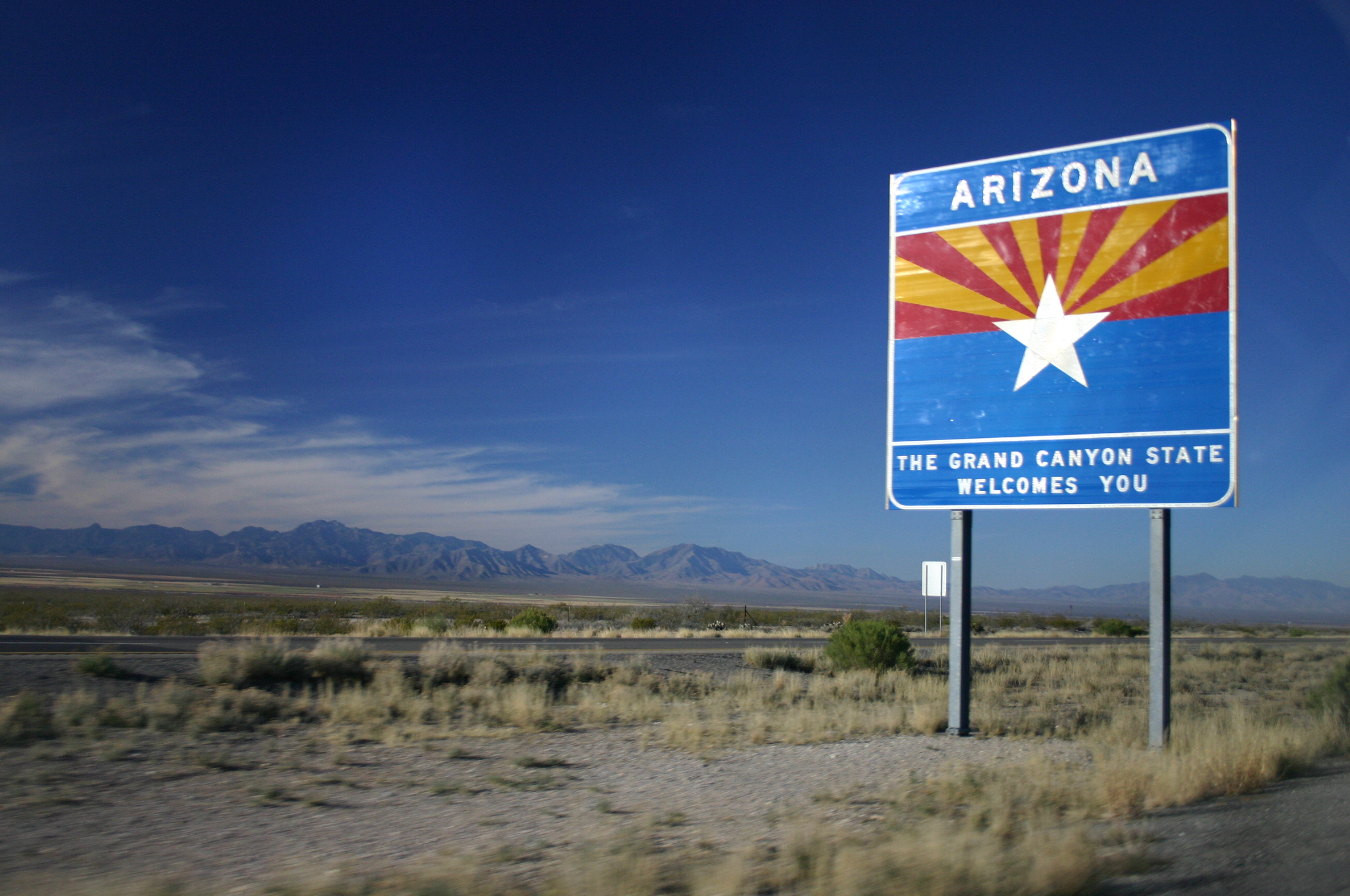
Entering Arizona on I-10 from New Mexico

Main interstate routes include I-17, and I-19 traveling south–north, I-8, I-10, and I-40 traveling west–east, and a short stretch of I-15 traveling southwest–northeast through the northwestern corner of the state. In the future, I-11 will travel through Arizona following US 93; it may replace I-19, and will terminate at the Mexican border in Nogales.

Phoenix is served by a combination of interstates, U.S. Highways, and state routes, many of which were funded by a ½ cent general sales tax measure approved by Maricopa County voters in 1985. New freeways are being added to the area, such as Loop 101, Loop 202, and eventually SR 24 and SR 30. Currently, two major interstates serve the area, I-10 and I-17. In the past decade, more than 100 miles (160 km) of new freeway have been constructed in the Phoenix metropolitan area by ADOT.

The Tucson metropolitan area is primarily served by I-10, I-19, and State Route 77. The 63-mile (101 km) I-19 departs from I-10 in the southern part of Tucson, travels through southern Tucson (including an exit serving the historic Mission San Xavier) and the retirement community of Green Valley, and terminates in Nogales, in Santa Cruz County, at the international border with Mexico. Like the ones in Mexico and Canada, destination signs on I-19 have metric distance figures in "kilometers" instead of standard "miles". SR 77 serves North Tucson and Tucson's northern suburbs including Casas Adobes, Catalina Foothills, Oro Valley, and Catalina. SR 77 continues northward until it terminates at the Navajo Nation in northeastern Arizona.

SR 210 (Barraza–Aviation Parkway) is a limited-access parkway built in the early 1990s to connect downtown Tucson to the southeastern portion of the city. Few new limited-access roads are in the plans in Tucson due to strong community opposition to freeways. However, a large-scale reconstruction and expansion of I-10 was supported and completed in mid-2009.

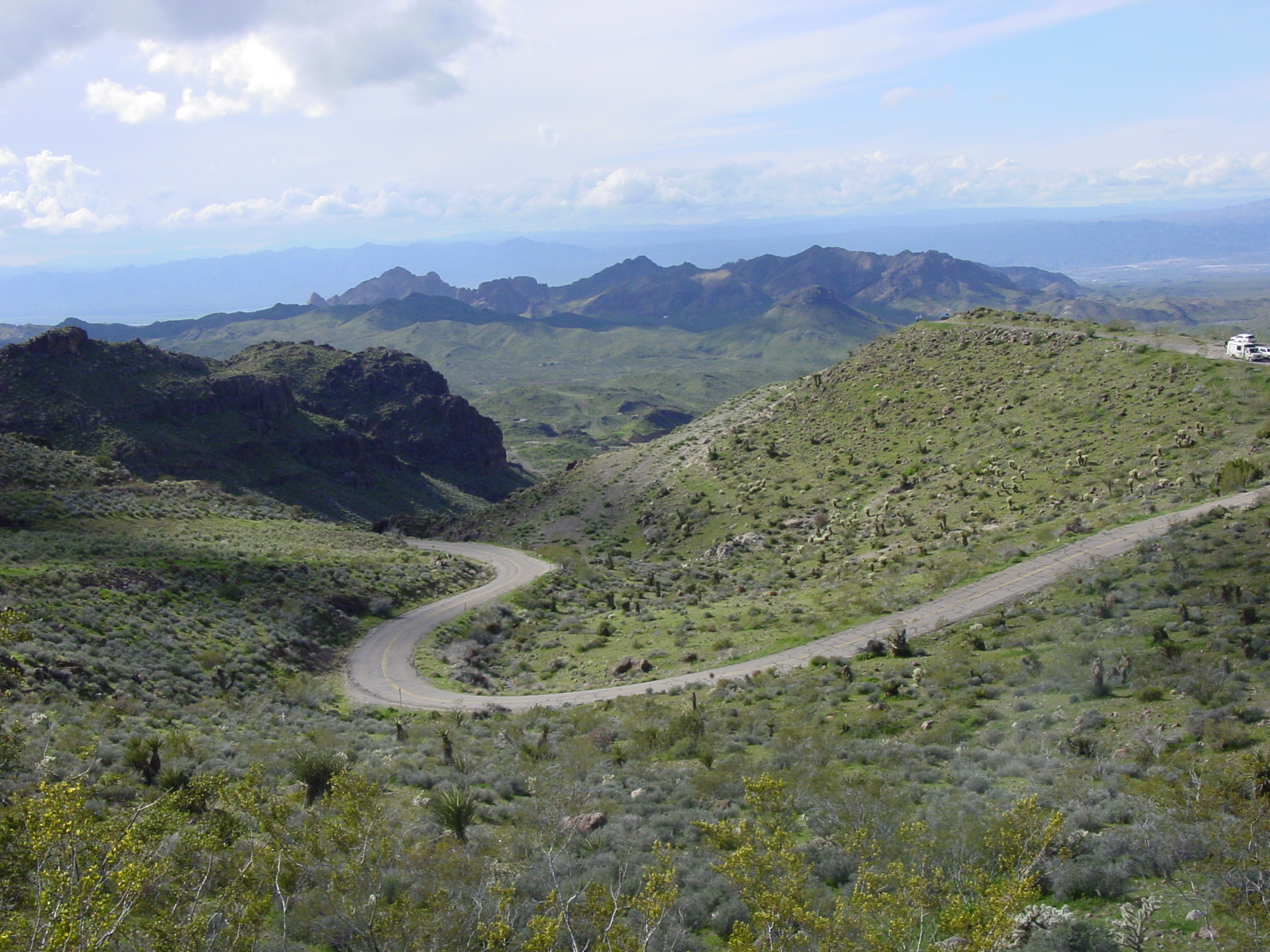
Route 66 between Oatman and Kingman.

Yuma is served by I-8, while Casa Grande served by I-8 and I-10; Flagstaff is served by I-17 and I-40. US 95 parallels the Colorado River, from Las Vegas to the Mexico–United States border near Yuma.

Historic US 66, a major route for Midwestern emigrants prior to the advent of the interstate highway system, traversed the northern part of the state, passing through Flagstaff and Kingman. US 66 in Arizona closely followed the route of what is now I-40 except for an 88-mile (142 km) stretch between Seligman and Kingman now known as SR 66, where the route veered to the north passing through Peach Springs.

=== Bridges and tunnels ===
The Deck Park Tunnel is a vehicular tunnel built underneath Downtown Phoenix as part of I-10. The tunnel extends from approximately North 3rd Avenue to North 3rd Street. At 2,887 feet (880 m), it ranks as the 42nd longest vehicular tunnel in the US. The tunnel was the last section of I-10 to be completed nationwide. There is a plaque dedicated to the commemoration of the tunnel in Margaret T. Hance Park.

== Port Infrastructure ==
=== Airports ===
Airports with scheduled commercial flights include: Phoenix Sky Harbor International Airport (IATA: PHX, ICAO: KPHX) in Phoenix (the largest airport and the major international airport in the state); Tucson International Airport (IATA: TUS, ICAO: KTUS) in Tucson; Phoenix-Mesa Gateway Airport (IATA: AZA, ICAO: KIWA) in Mesa; Yuma International Airport (IATA: YUM, ICAO: KYUM) in Yuma; Prescott Municipal Airport (PRC) in Prescott; Flagstaff Pulliam Airport (IATA: FLG, ICAO: KFLG) in Flagstaff, and Grand Canyon National Park Airport (GCP), a small, but busy, single-runway facility providing tourist flights, mostly from Las Vegas. Phoenix Sky Harbor is the seventh busiest airport in the world in terms of aircraft movements, and regularly in the top 15 for passengers.

Other significant airports without regularly scheduled commercial flights include Scottsdale Municipal Airport (IATA: SCF, ICAO: KSDL) in Scottsdale.

== Projects ==
In May 2006, voters in Tucson approved a Regional Transportation Plan (a comprehensive bus transit/streetcar/roadway improvement program), and its funding via a new half-cent sales tax increment. The centerpiece of the plan is a light rail streetcar system (possibly similar to the Portland Streetcar in Oregon) that will travel through the downtown area, connecting the main University of Arizona campus with the Rio Nuevo master plan area on the western edge of downtown.

== See also ==
- Plug-in electric vehicles in Arizona
