= Phoenix Pride =

LGBTQ+ Pride Parade in Phoenix, Arizona

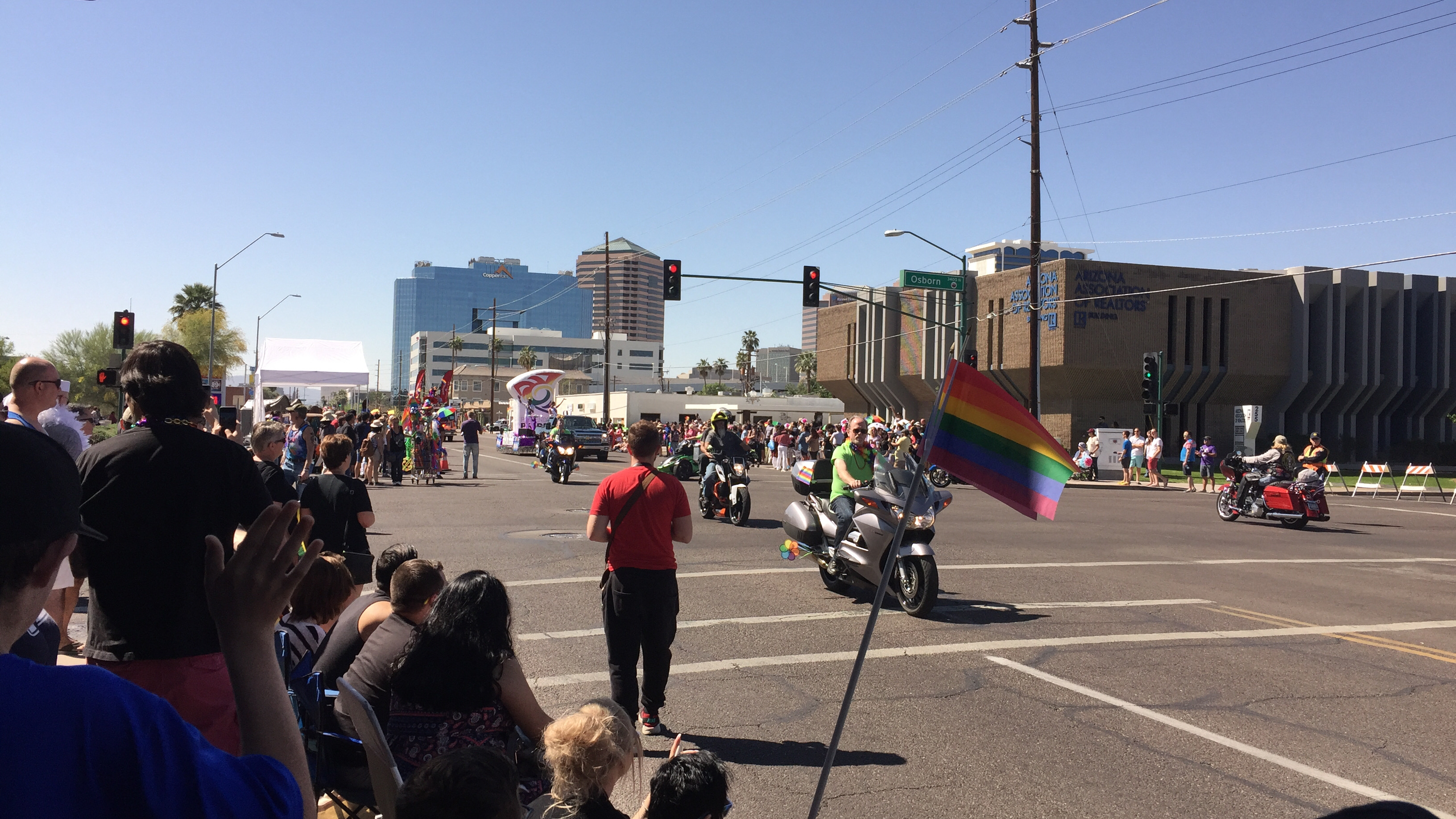
Marchers at 2017's Phoenix Pride

Phoenix Pride (formerly known as Phoenix Pride March & Rally, Desert Pride, Arizona Central Pride, and Phoenix Pride Festival) is a parade and festival held each year in Phoenix, Arizona to celebrate the lesbian, gay, bisexual, and transgender (LGBTQ) people and their allies.

Unlike other pride parades in major US cities, which is held in June to commemorate the Stonewall riots, Phoenix Pride has been held outside of the summer months in Arizona since at least 2004, due to high summer temperatures.

== History ==
Phoenix has had a history of hosting gay pride-themed events even before the first pride parade was held in 1981. In June 1977, the first gay pride week was organized in Phoenix by the city's LGBTQ+ community at the time.

The first pride parade in Phoenix took place in 1981, and it was organized by the Lesbian & Gay Pride Planning Committee, which was led by Kirk Baxter and BJ Bud. The first parade was a march from Patriots Square Park (now the site of CityScape) to the Arizona State Capitol. The event was a politically focused march that aimed to bring awareness to LGBT rights issues in the Phoenix area. Newspaper reports at the time estimated 600 to 1,000 people attended the evening march, although later research has put the figure to over 700 people having taken part.

From 1983 to 1985, the march took place on a portion of Phoenix's Central Avenue Corridor, and the event in 1987 became politically focused once again, as it was combined with an event aimed at recalling controversial Governor Evan Mecham.

A non-profit organization was established to coordinate the pride festival in 1991. That same year, after a decade of hosting the event in Phoenix, the pride festival was moved to Tempe Diablo Stadium.

The event was moved to Margaret T. Hance Park in Phoenix in 1998, and moved to Steele Indian School Park in 2003, where it is still being held to this day.

In 2020, the parade and festival was impacted by the coronavirus pandemic, with event organizers saying they will reschedule the event to a time during the fall. Days after the announcement to postpone was made, organizers announced an alternative date of November 7 and 8. 2020's parade was later rescheduled to 2021, in effect cancelling Phoenix Pride for 2020.

On May 30, 2026, Phoenix Pride filed for Chapter 11 bankruptcy protection, citing rising operational costs, fundraising challenges and a lack of sponsorships.

=== Event by year ===
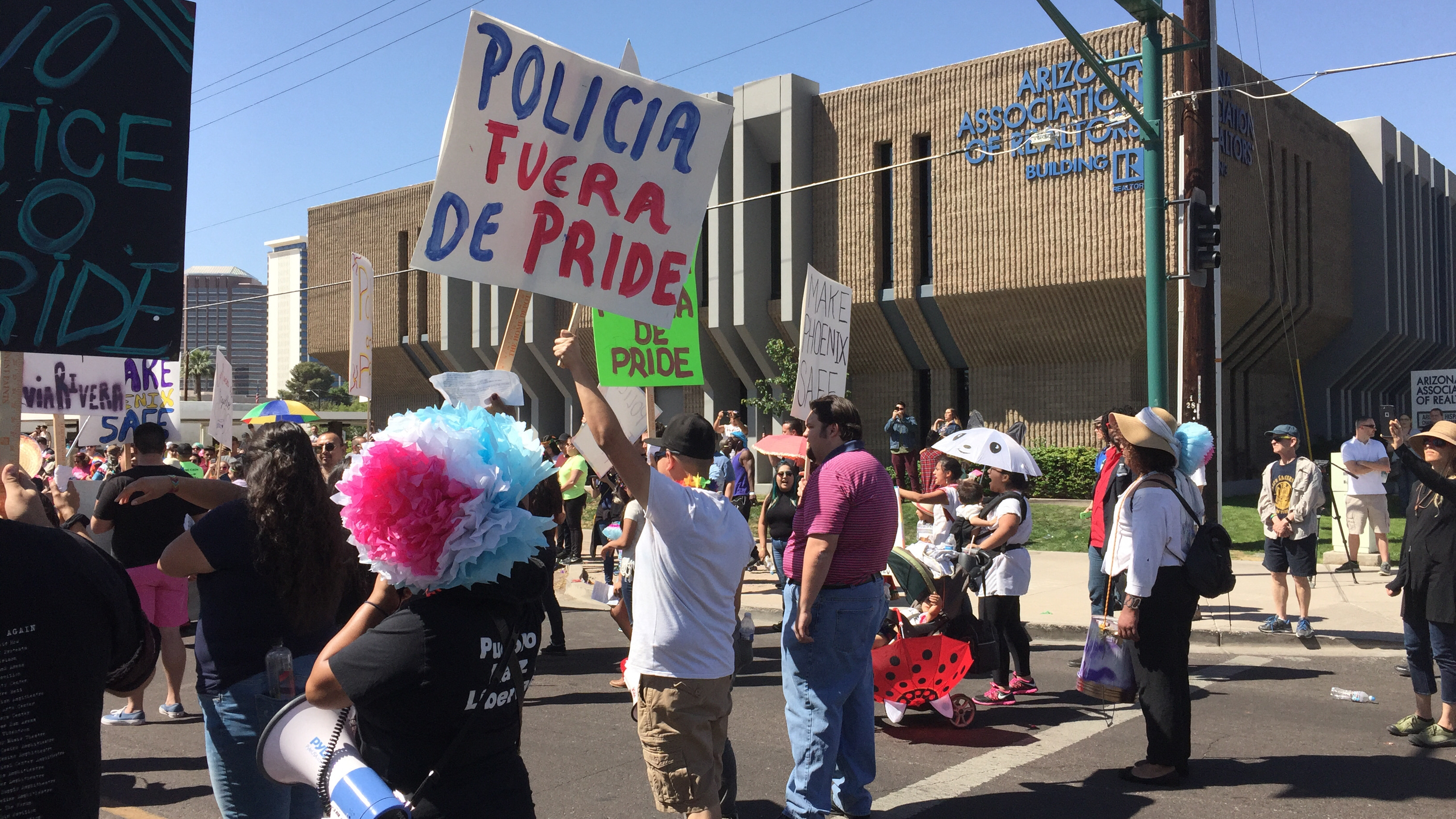
Immigrant rights protesters managed to disrupt the Pride Parade in 2017.

Phoenix Pride History
Year	Dates	Theme/Slogan	Location	Notes
1981	June	We Are Here	March: Patriots Square Park to Arizona State Capitol, Phoenix	Keynote speaker: Lesbian activist Arlie Scott and Leonard Matlovich.
1982		We are Family	March: Patriots Square Park to Wesley Bolin Memorial Plaza, Phoenix	Keynote speaker: Charlotte Bunch. 17 people walked to the event from Tucson.
1983		Uniting for Freedom, Recognition, and Understanding	March: Central Avenue, Phoenix; Rally: Phoenix Civic Plaza (now Phoenix Convention Center), Phoenix	Keynote speaker: David Clarenbach
1984		Unity and More in ’84	March: Central Avenue, Phoenix; Rally: Phoenix Civic Plaza (now Phoenix Convention Center), Phoenix	Keynote speaker: Flo Kennedy
1985		Our Future in Our Hands	March: Central Avenue, Phoenix	Keynote speaker: John Heilman
1986		Phoenix Pride Emerging	Event: South Mountain Park, Phoenix	Keynote speaker: Cleve Jones
1987		Silent No More / Hands Across the Capitol	Rally: Wesley Bolin Memorial Plaza, Phoenix	Participants held hands, and surrounded the Arizona State Capitol.
1988		Unity ’88	Festival: Phoenix Civic Plaza (now Phoenix Convention Center), Phoenix	Keynote speaker: Carolyn Warner.
1989		Stonewall Remembered	March: Patriots Square Park to Wesley Bolin Memorial Plaza, Phoenix; Rally: Wesley Bolin Memorial Plaza, Phoenix	Keynote speaker: Karen Thompson.
1990		A New Decade of Pride	Festival: El Lienzo Charro Rodeo Grounds, Phoenix	Keynote speaker: Lynn Lavner.
1991		Desert Pride: It's Hot	Festival: Kiwanis Park, Tempe	
1992		Pride = Power: A Simple Matter of Justice	Festival: Tempe Diablo Stadium, Tempe	
1993		A Family of Pride	Festival: Tempe Diablo Stadium, Tempe	
1994		Stonewall 25: A Global Celebration of Pride	Festival: Tempe Diablo Stadium, Tempe	Festival expands to becoming a three-day event.
1995		Discover Pride	Festival: Tempe Diablo Stadium, Tempe	
1996	May 31 – June 2	Discover: Pride Without Borders	Festival: Tempe Diablo Stadium, Tempe	
1997	June (Festival); April (Parade)	Pride...Equality Through Visibility	Festival: Tempe Diablo Stadium, Tempe	
1998		Pride 98...A Gateway to Change	Festival: Margaret T. Hance Park, Phoenix	
1999		Millions of Lives...One Voice in Pride	Festival: Margaret T. Hance Park, Phoenix	First year of 5K Pride Run
2000	April 14 (Pageant) April 15 (Parade)	One Heart, One Mind, One Vision, Take Pride, Take Joy, Take Action	Festival: Margaret T. Hance Park, Phoenix	The Transgender Pride Flag made its debut during this year's event.
2001	June	What Part of Equal Don't You Understand	Festival: Margaret T. Hance Park, Phoenix	
2002		For One Day Feel Like the Majority	Festival: Margaret T. Hance Park, Phoenix	
2003		Let Your Pride Be Your Guide	Festival: Steele Indian School Park, Phoenix	First year the pride parade headed in a northerly direction.
2004	April 3 (Parade); April 4 (Festival)	Celebrating Rainbow Flag 25	Festival: Steele Indian School Park, Phoenix	First ever Phoenix Gay Pride Week proclamation made by then Mayor Phil Gordon.
2005	April 2 (Parade); April 2–3 (Festival)	25 Years of Pride in Phoenix	Festival: Steele Indian School Park, Phoenix	5K Pride Run held on April 3.
2006	April 1 (Parade); April 1–2 (Festival)	10th Annual Parade	Parade: 3rd Street, Phoenix; Festival: Steele Indian School Park, Phoenix	5K Pride Run held on April 2.
2007	April 14 (Parade); April 14–15 (Festival)	Over The Top	Parade: 3rd Street, Phoenix; Festival: Steele Indian School Park, Phoenix	5K Pride Run held on April 15.
2008	April 14 (Parade); April 14–15 (Festival)	The Celebration Starts Here! (Parade); More Color, More Voices, More Pride! (Festival)	Festival: Steele Indian School Park, Phoenix	
2009	April 18 (Parade); April 18–19 (Festival)	Celebrate Community, Celebrate Family, Celebrate YOU!	Festival: Steele Indian School Park, Phoenix	Pride Gala organized for the first time in June, as well as the first OUTdayPHX in October.
2010	April 17 (Parade); April 17–18 (Festival)	1 Community. 3 Decades. 4 Pride	Festival: Steele Indian School Park, Phoenix	Parade sponsored by Verizon Wireless.
2011	April 16 (Parade); April 16–17 (Festival)	Do Ask. Do Tell. Be Proud	Festival: Steele Indian School Park, Phoenix	
2012	April 21 (Parade); April 21–22 (Festival)	Born This Way. Feel It. Live It. Be It. Proud!	Festival: Steele Indian School Park, Phoenix	
2013	April 6 (Parade); April 6–7 (Festival)	Equality & Justice For All	Festival: Steele Indian School Park, Phoenix	
2014	April 5 (Parade); April 5–6 (Festival)	Be Heard, Stay Strong, Be You	Festival: Steele Indian School Park, Phoenix	Celebrity Grand Marshal: Brittney Griner
2015	April 12 (Parade); April 11–12 (Festival)	Passionate, Powerful & Proud	Festival: Steele Indian School Park, Phoenix	Parade moved to a Sunday, for the first time.
2016	April 3 (Parade); April 2–3 (Festival)	Community Strong	Festival: Steele Indian School Park, Phoenix	
2017	April 2 (Parade); April 1–2 (Festival)	Stand Up, Stand Proud	Festival: Steele Indian School Park, Phoenix	
2018	April 8 (Parade); April 7–8 (Festival)	United We Stand, Equality For All	Festival: Steele Indian School Park, Phoenix	
2019	April 7 (Parade); April 6–7 (Festival)	Celebrating Progress: Past, Present, and Future	Festival: Steele Indian School Park, Phoenix	
2020	Cancelled	Celebrating 40 Years of Fortitude	Planned: Steele Indian School Park, Phoenix	Event originally scheduled for April 4–5. Originally postponed to November 7–8 due to COVID-19 pandemic in the United States, later rescheduled to 2021, in effect a cancellation.
2021	November 6 (Parade); November 6–7 (Festival)	Celebrating 40 Years of Fortitude	Steele Indian School Park, Phoenix	Originally scheduled for April 10 and 11, with the parade on April 11. Postponed to November due to ongoing concerns surrounding the COVID-19 pandemic.

== Criticism ==
Activists who disrupted 2017's pride parade have criticized Phoenix Pride as being overly commercialized, in its present form, and accused organizers of straying from its original theme of standing up for the rights of people. Similar criticisms have been leveled against other pride parades around the country.
