= Margaret Hance =

American politician (1923–1990)

Margaret Taylor Hance
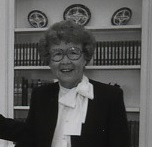

52nd Mayor of Phoenix
- In office January 2, 1976 – January 2, 1984
- Preceded by: Timothy A. Barrow
- Succeeded by: Terry Goddard

Personal details
- Born: July 2, 1923 Spirit Lake, Iowa, U.S.
- Died: April 29, 1990 (aged 66)
- Party: Republican
- Spouse: Richard M. Hance
- Education: Scripps College

Margaret Taylor Hance (July 2, 1923 – April 29, 1990) served as mayor of Phoenix, Arizona, between 1976 and 1984, winning four consecutive two year terms. Hance was the first woman to hold the office.

== Biography ==
Hance (born Margaret Taylor) was born in Spirit Lake, Iowa, to Glen C. and Helen Kenny Taylor, the youngest of three children. She grew up active in athletics. She was a Girl Scout in Phoenix, AZ.

She earned a bachelor's degree from Scripps College in Claremont, California, in 1945. Hance, then Taylor, married Richard M. Hance in 1945, and the couple had three children.

Mrs. Hance was the president of the Junior League of Phoenix, a volunteer organization for women who want to improve the community, from 1959 to 1960.

In 1967, Hance began producing documentaries for a local PBS affiliate. She began her involvement in local politics following the death of her husband in 1970. Among her first significant public initiatives was creating the Phoenix Mountain Preserve, for which she was unofficially known as the "Mother of Mountain Preserve".

After retiring as mayor, Hance worked with the Ronald Reagan and George H. W. Bush administrations.

Hance died of cancer on April 29, 1990.

== Awards and honors ==
- Woman of the Year, 1978, Advertising Club
- Centennial Award, Salvation Army
- President, National Conference of Republican Mayors and Elected Officials, 1982
- The Margaret T. Hance Park that is on top of the Deck Park Tunnel in Phoenix is named after Hance.
