= Steele Indian School Park =

Public park in Phoenix, Arizona

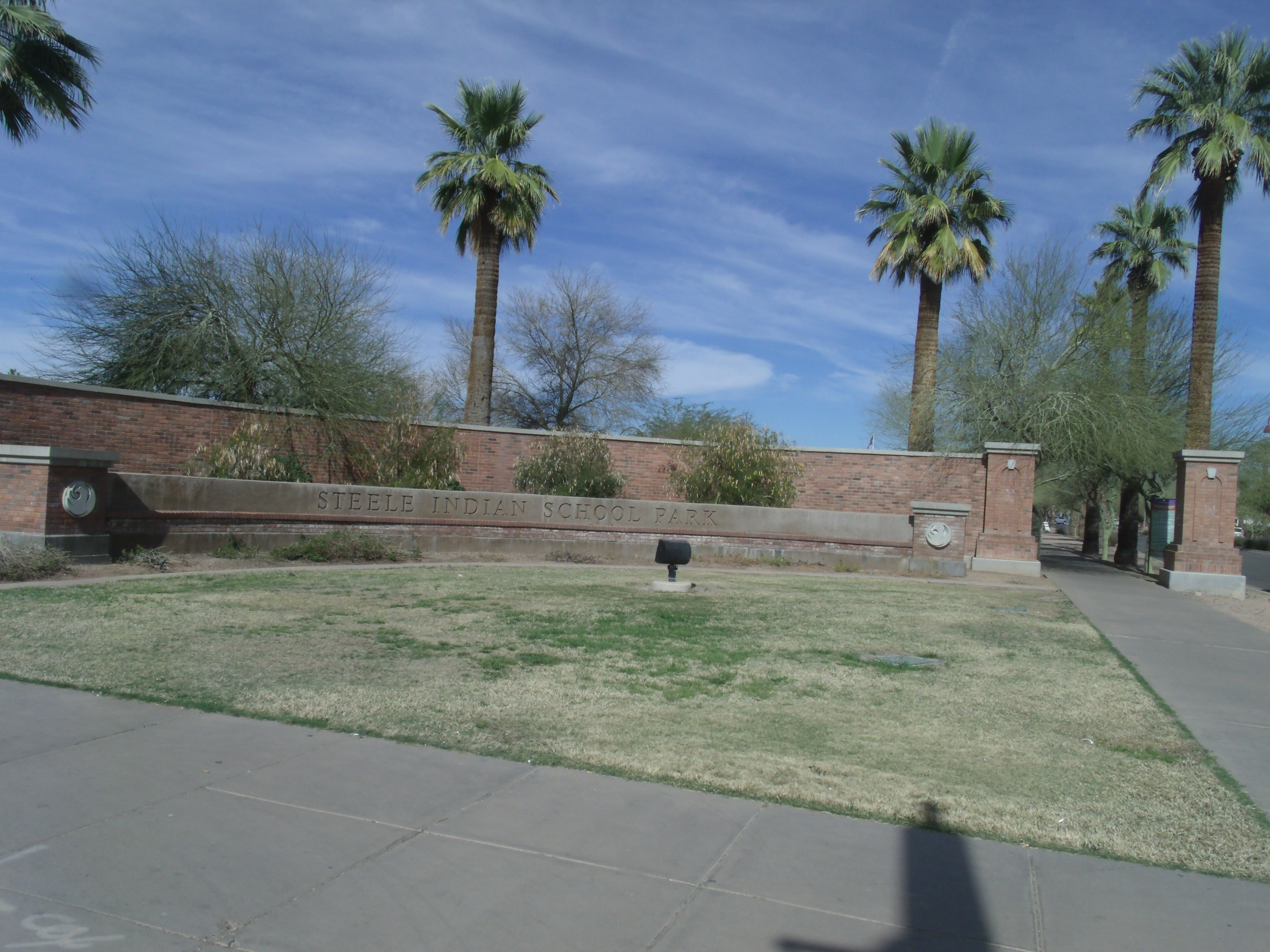
- Steele Indian School Park entrance
- Interactive map of Steele Indian School Park
- Location: Encanto Village, Phoenix, Arizona
- Coordinates: 33°29′52.0116″N 112°4′11.0316″W
- Created: 2001
- Public transit: Indian School Road and Central Avenue
- Website: https://www.phoenix.gov/parks/parks/alphabetical/s-parks/steele-indian-school

Steele Indian School Park is located on the northeast corner of Indian School Road and Central Avenue in Encanto Village, Phoenix, Arizona.

== Geography ==
Indian School Road, on which the former Phoenix Indian School and the current Steele Indian School Park are located, is a major east/west arterial street connecting Central Phoenix and its western suburbs, such as Avondale, Goodyear, Litchfield Park, and Buckeye. To the east the street connects with Scottsdale (especially its downtown business, entertainment/nightclub and "Old Town" cultural and tourist district) and the Salt River Pima-Maricopa Indian Community.

== History ==
=== Phoenix Indian School ===
The park is on the site of the Phoenix Indian School, one of several boarding schools owned and operated by the U.S. government, designed in the late 19th century to socialize and assimilate Native Americans into the dominant Euro-American socio-cultural system. Through the Department of Indian Affairs, the US Government committed systemic cultural genocide. These schools became controversial in later decades for the mistreatment of their students, as well as the suppression and prohibition of the students' indigenous culture and languages.

The Phoenix school began operations on the site in 1892. In the late 1980s it was declared unnecessary as most Native students attended schools either in the general community, or on their own reservations, by this time; also, the land on which the school was built, now part of a busy commercial district in Central Phoenix, was much too financially valuable by this time to justify the school's continued operation. After the school shut down for good in 1990, the buildings and grounds sat vacant for a few years.

=== Park history ===
The city of Phoenix obtained the land in 1996 through an intricate three-way land exchange involving the Florida-based Barron Collier Company and the federal government (the Bank of America Tower was built in the late 1990s in downtown Phoenix by a partnership between Barron Collier Company and Opus West Corporation on land acquired in the exchange). At the time, Barron Collier Company also established a $35 million trust fund for the education of Native children in Arizona. The park is named after Horace C. Steele, a local businessman and philanthropist; his charitable foundation donated $2.5 million to start development of the park. The park opened in late 2001.

The Phoenix Indian School Preservation Coalition, co-chaired by Jean Chaudhuri and Lenny Foster, gathered support from 18 of 21 tribes in Arizona for the specific purpose of encouraging certain design features in the development of the park. Jean, along with John Lewis (Inter-tribal President), Arlo Nau (President - Native American Heritage Society), Tom Amiotte (President - Native American Viet Nam Veterans) presented their concepts and ideas to Mayor Paul Johnson and members of his staff in early 1991. This group was active in every public meeting regarding the development of the property, supporting the inclusion of cultural and historical significance in the site plan. No mention of the group or its efforts appeared in the public media or final documentation of the story of how the park was developed. Jean passed in 1998. The park opened in November 2001.

In July 2007, the park was the site of a mid-air collision involving two television news helicopters of both local Phoenix television stations, ABC affiliate KNXV-TV and independently-owned station, KTVK. The accident occurred while both choppers were covering a police pursuit, and resulted in the deaths of the occupants of both aircraft.

== Park features ==
The park and its ponds are open 364 days a year. It is served by the Central at Indian School station on the METRO Light Rail system.

The Phoenix Indian School buildings that are on the National Register of Historic Places and are being restored and renovated. Alumni of the school want to use several buildings as museum for documenting the school's history, and for a Native American cultural center.

=== Events ===
The park is the site of a Native American arts and crafts fair and exhibition, organized by the Pueblo Grande Museum and the Arizona Indian Festival.

Every April Phoenix Pride hosts a Gay pride festival in the park, near the V.A hospital. The city of Phoenix has held its annual Fourth of July fireworks display at the park for several years.

== Historic buildings ==
Historic buildings in Steele Park
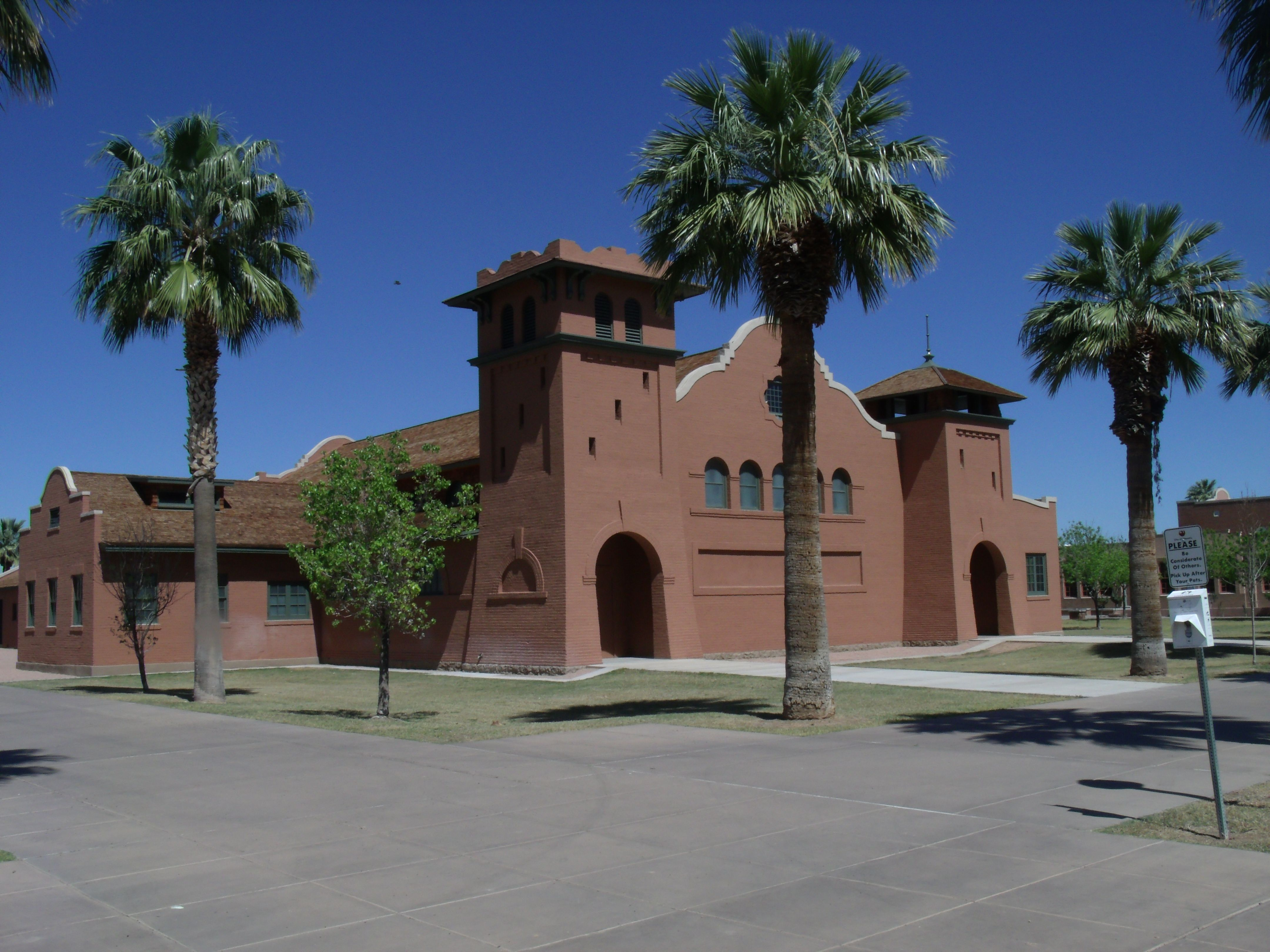
Historic Phoenix Indian School

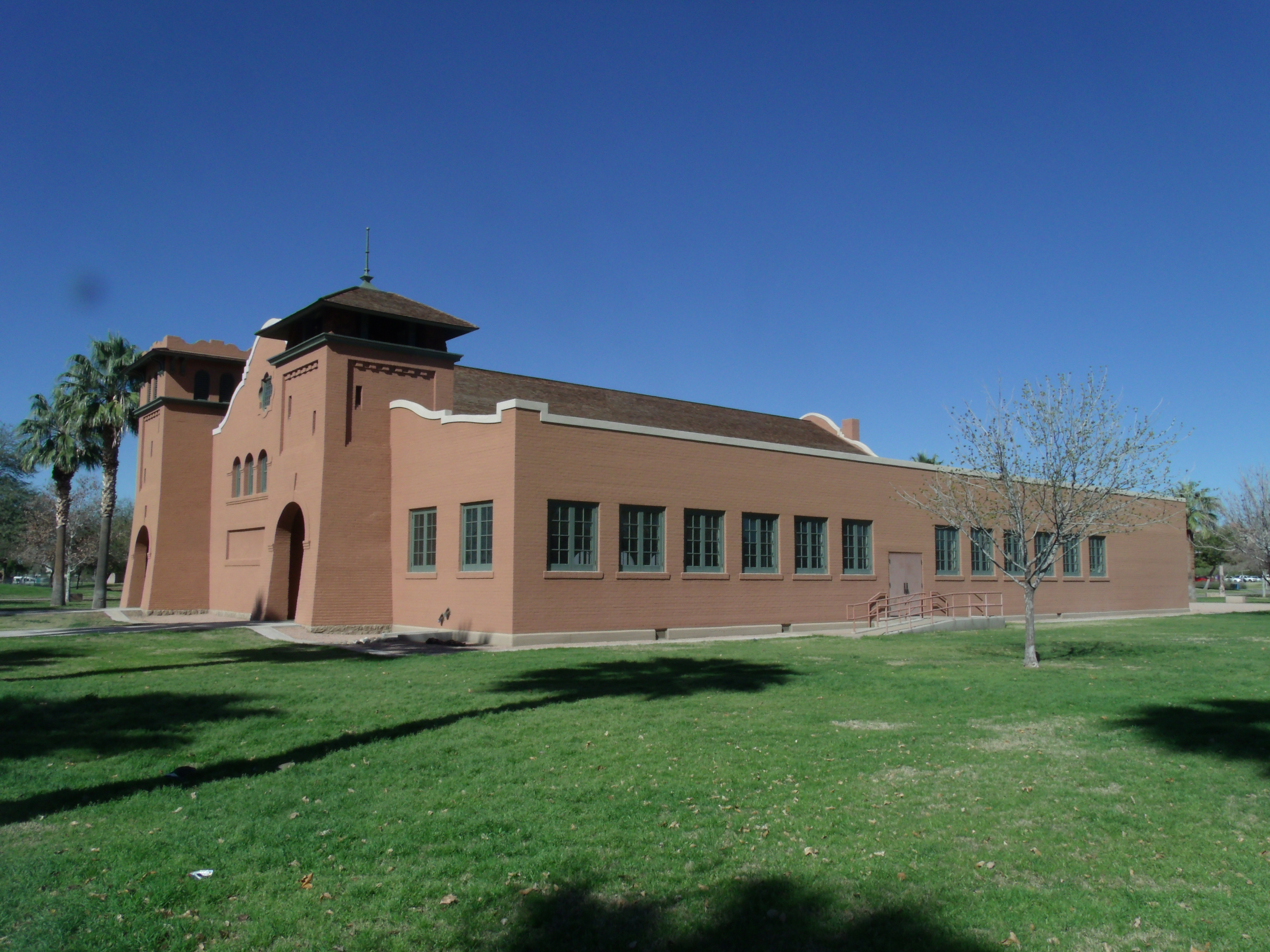
Different view of the historic Indian School.

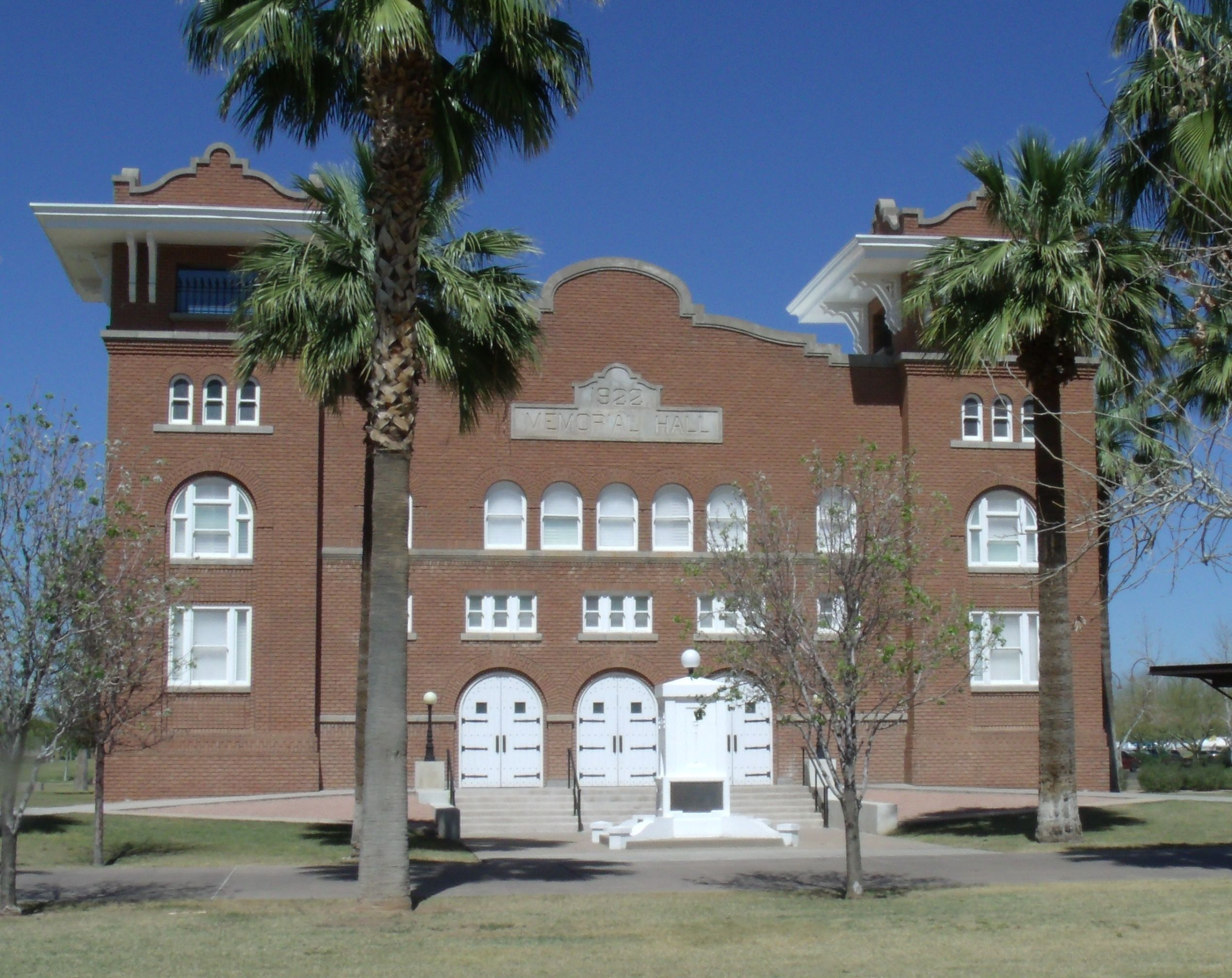
Memorial Hall (built 1922)

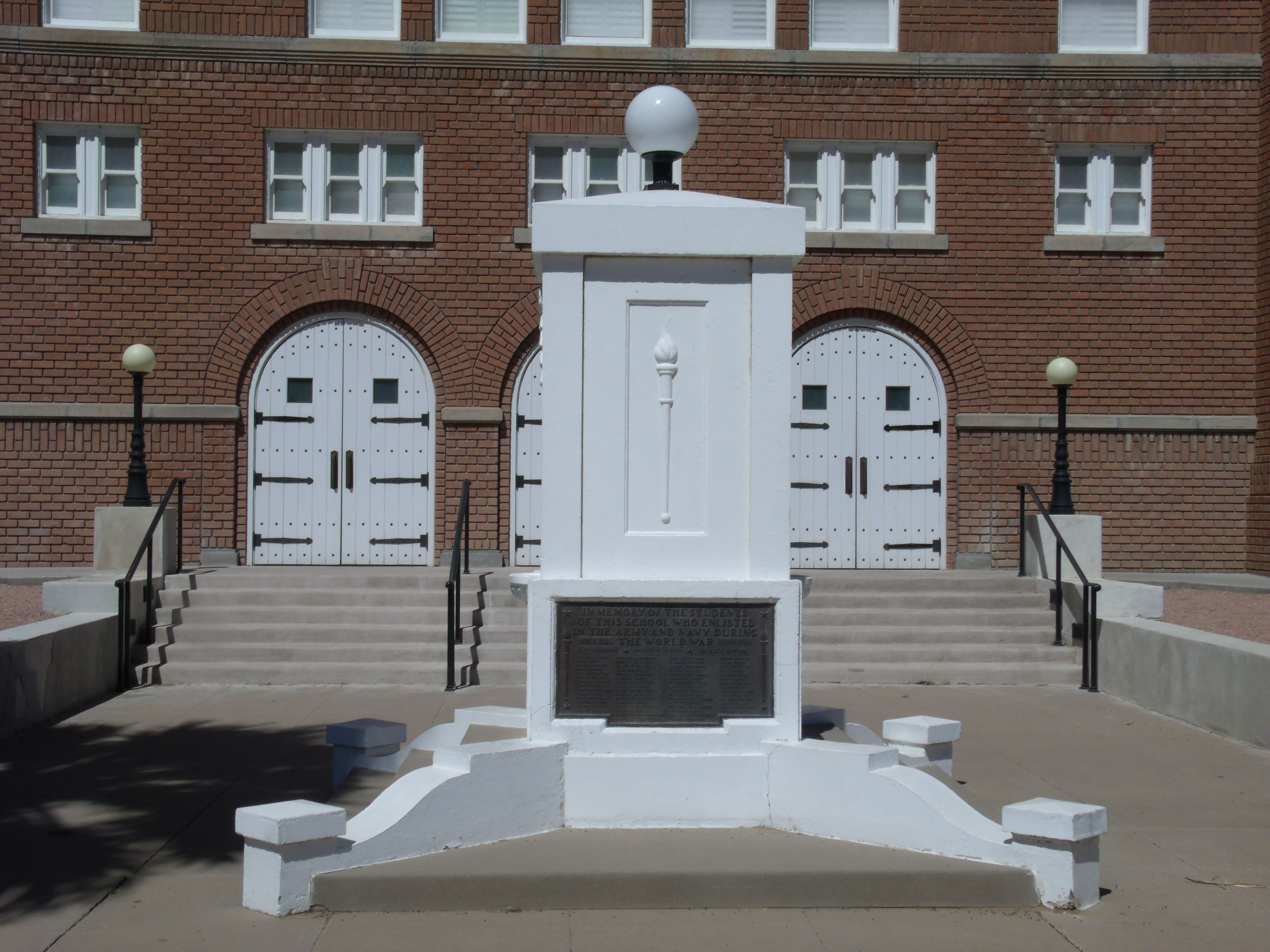
World War I War Memorial

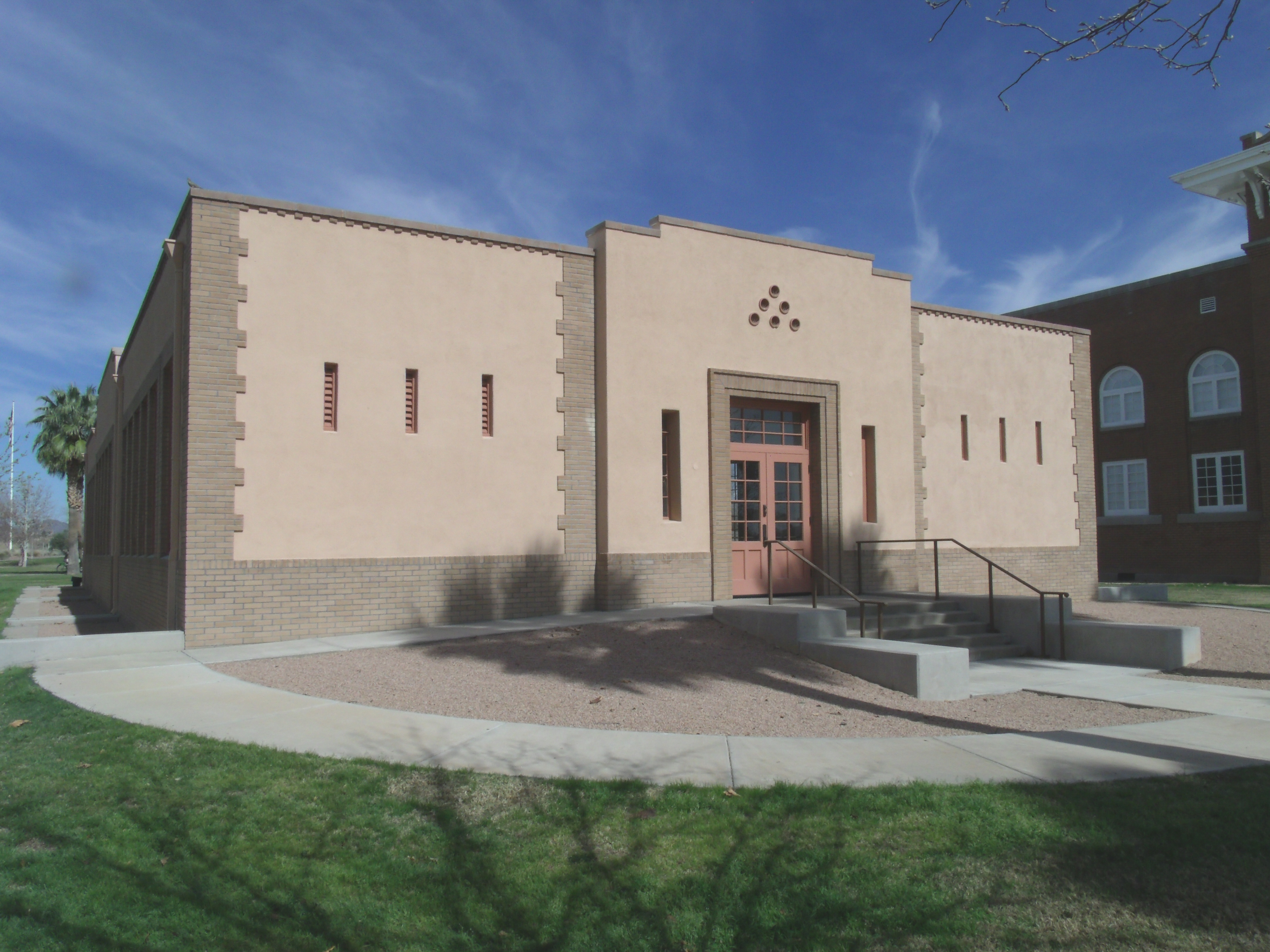
The Indian School Band Building built in 1931 and located in the compounds of Phoenix’s Steele Indian School Park in 300 E. Indian School Rd.
