= Enchanted Island Amusement Park =

Amusement park in Phoenix, Arizona

- Previously known as Kiddie Land
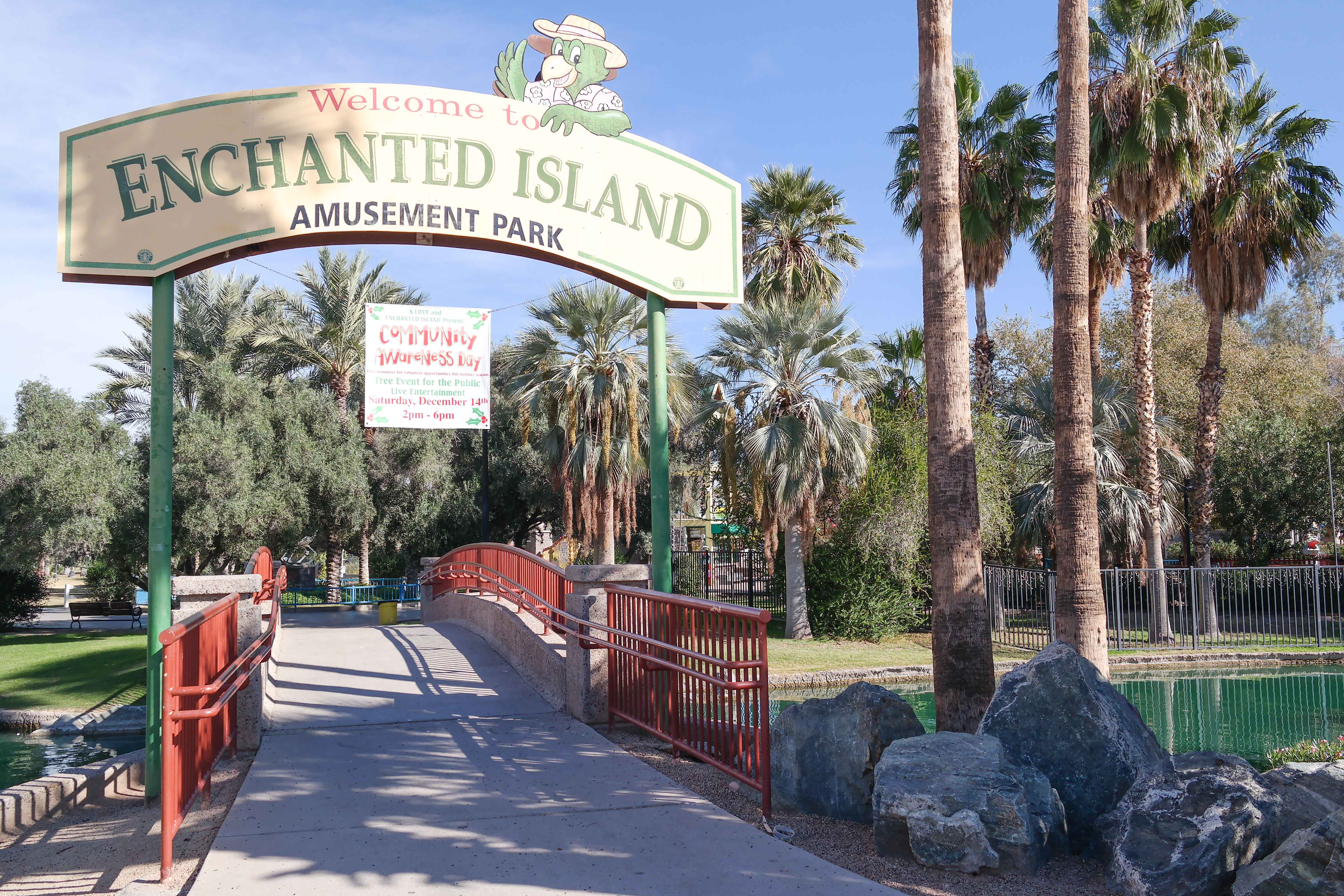
- Interactive map of Enchanted Island Amusement Park
- Location: 1202 W. Encanto Blvd., Phoenix, Arizona, USA
- Coordinates: 33.474533°N 112.0899603°W
- Opened: 1946
- Slogan: Just for fun
- Operating season: All year

Attractions
- Total: 9
- Website: Official website

Enchanted Island Amusement Park is a 7.5-acre amusement park located in Phoenix, Arizona. It is in the center of Encanto Park, a 222-acre city park. It features nine rides and a variety of attractions.

== History ==
Enchanted Island originally opened in 1946 as Kiddieland. In 1986 City of Phoenix closed down the park for major renovations. Many amusement rides, including the Allan Herschell Carousel were sold off. A group of residents established fund to restore the carousel in the park, and it was restored and re-dedicated in 1991 when Kiddieland was re-opened as Enchanted Island Amusement Park.

== Rides and Attractions ==
- C.P. Huntington Train is a replica C.P. Huntington Train.
- Encanto Carousel is the oldest operating carousel since 1948.
- Dragon Wagon is a kiddie roller coaster.
- Rock n Roll is like the spinning tea cups
- Parachute Tower has 6 umbrellas and fits 12 passengers.
- Mini-Enterprise has 4 kiddie helicopters and 4 spaceships. Each has a capacity of 4 kids.
- Castle Clash Game medieval water game where you shoot at targets that make cannons go off that wet your opponent
- World Famous Kiddie Bumper Boats (seasonal)
- Splash Zone (seasonal) includes two small kiddie slides, 2 water mushrooms, flowers, frog and a crocodile with water flowing out from them.
- Red Baron has 8 planes and accommodates 2 kids per plane.
- Combo Cars
- Giant Climbing Wall
- Coin Operated Rides
- Games of Skill

Around the park, you will find pedal boat and canoe rentals, a lagoon for fishing and an adjacent golf course.
