= Park Central Mall =

Park Central
- Location: Phoenix, AZ
- Coordinates: 33.483483°N 112.075331°W
- Address: 3121 N 3rd Ave
- Opened: 1957
- Developer: Albert Behrstock, Ralph G. Bergbacher, A.J. Bergbacher
- Manager: Park Central Management
- Architect: Welton Becket, Ralph Haver, John Schotanus Jr. 1956–57 Al Beadle 1967
- Num. of stores: 20+
- Num. of anchor tenants: 3
- Floors: 1, anchors have 2 floors
- Public transit: Osborn/Central Avenue; Thomas/Central Avenue

Park Central Mall was the first shopping mall in Phoenix, Arizona. It is located in Encanto Village, on Central Avenue and Osborn Road.

Today it exists as a mixed-use, business park primarily occupied by regional administrative offices for non-profit hospital operator Dignity Health (formerly known as Catholic Healthcare West), and regional offices for UnitedHealth Group. The property currently is known simply as Park Central.

== History ==
Park Central Shopping City, as it originally was known, was first envisioned by Ralph Burgbacher and his older brother, A.J. Burgbacher. The two men purchased the 46-acre (190,000 m^{2}) Central Avenue Dairy in the 1950s. At the time Phoenix was a much smaller city, and the mall's location, 2 miles (3.2 km) north of the state capitol was an early edge city, which in time came to be known as "Uptown" Phoenix. Other developers criticized the brothers, believing a development out in the "dairy farm" area was futile, but development proceeded and the open-air mall was completed in 1957. The mall was designed by a collaboration of architects in the Mid-Century Modern style. Welton Becket designed the Goldwater's building and Ralph Haver and John Schotanus Jr. designing other parts of the mall. The mall was built by Kitchell-Phillips Contractors Inc. When the mall opened, the primary anchors were a twin-level Goldwater's which predated the initial opening of the mall. It opened November 8, 1956. There were also a twin-level Diamond's, and a J.J. Newberry five and dime store. Ribbon-cutting ceremonies for the mall and its first 31 stores were held on April 1, 1957. Goldwater's and Diamond's soon closed their older, downtown stores favoring their new midtown location in the mall. When JCPenney closed its downtown location in the mid-1960s, the downtown area never would regain its status as the retail draw it once was. The original Phoenix-based Playboy club was across Central Ave. to the East; it closed in the mid-1980s.

As Phoenix quickly grew, the area around Park Central Mall saw an increasing number of mid-rise and high-rise office buildings built along Central Avenue, and eventually became known as the central business district. Part of this mid-1960s transition included the new addition of a twin level JCPenney store at the mall, and a covered parking deck on the northeast end of the property built in 1967, to help combat the hot summertime temperatures. The new structures were designed by Al Beadle.

Unable to compete with newer enclosed and air-conditioned shopping malls, Park Central, still an open-air facility, had lost most of its major retailers by the very late 1980s. The first major anchor to leave was Robinson's, which had purchased and converted the Goldwater's store years earlier, closing the location down just before the end of the decade. The second major anchor to leave was JCPenney, closing just at the start of the 1990s. Finally the last anchor, Dillard's, which had purchased and converted Diamond's a few years prior, became a discount Dillard's Clearance Center and remained open in that format until the mid-1990s.

== Current ==
Conversion of the property began shortly after the last anchor closed and most vacant retail space was converted to lease-able office space. Much of the original architectural design was covered up or removed and the exterior of the mall was given a Postmodern appearance. The Diamond's space at the west / back end of the old mall became the Arizona regional offices for Catholic Healthcare West (later known as Dignity Health after it became independent of the Catholic Church), parent company of St. Joseph's Hospital located on an adjacent property. Banner Health Systems soon moved some administrative functions into what was Goldwater's, and finally the old JCPenney space became offices for UnitedHealth Group. The remaining smaller retail spaces began to fill with nearly a dozen small restaurants mostly located at the east/front end of the old mall (including Starbucks Coffee, Jamba Juice and Qdoba Mexican Grill). Other smaller businesses, such as a flower shop, a shoe repair shop, a vitamin/health supplements store, computer training company Training a la Carte, the primary customer care call center for cable service provider Cable One and a branch location of Wells Fargo Financial, occupy the remaining storefronts. A Hampton Inn hotel location sits on the southwest corner of the property adjacent to the Dignity Health offices.

Nearly all the mall's original buildings still stand, and most have only cosmetic changes.

In October 2017, the city of Phoenix proposed that Amazon.com locate its "second headquarters", expected to employ 50,000 people, at the Park Central location.

== Anchor tenants ==
- Banner Health Systems – Occupying the original Goldwater's
- Dignity Health – Occupying the original Diamond's
- UnitedHealth Group – Occupying the original JCPenney

== Light rail ==
Park Central Mall has its own Osborn/Central Avenue stop on the B Line of the Valley Metro Rail & Streetcar system.

== See also ==
- Encanto, Phoenix
- Maryvale Mall
- Chris-Town Mall
