= Plug-in electric vehicles in Arizona =

As of June 2021, there were about 29,000 electric vehicles registered in Arizona, equivalent to one for every 250 residents, the seventh-highest in the United States.

== Government policy ==
Initially, Arizona's registration fee for electric vehicles was 1% of the equivalent fee for gas-powered vehicles. However, this changed to 20% in 2022, and will become 100% in 2023.

== Charging stations ==
As of March 2022, there were about 900 public charging station locations with 2,200 charging ports in Arizona.

The Infrastructure Investment and Jobs Act, signed into law in November 2021, allocates US$76.5 million to charging stations in Arizona.

== Manufacturing ==
Arizona is home to a large number of electric vehicle manufacturing plants, including those for Rivian, Lucid Motors, and Nikola. The state "has the potential to become a massive global leader in emerging auto manufacturing". Arizona has also been proposed as a hub for copper mining, with the intent of using copper for electric vehicles.

== By region ==
=== Flagstaff ===
In March 2021, electric vehicle manufacturer UACJ Whitehall announced plans to build a US$60 million plant in Flagstaff.

=== Phoenix ===
As of June 2022, there were 63 public charging stations in Phoenix.

=== Tucson ===
In June 2021, the Tucson city council approved an ordinance requiring new single- and double-family homes to have at least one parking space designated for electric vehicle charging.

=== Indian reservations ===
In December 2021, the Salt River Pima–Maricopa Indian Community announced plans to fully transition its community bus fleet to electric.
