= Thomas/Central Avenue station =

Light rail station in Phoenix, Arizona

Thomas/Central Ave
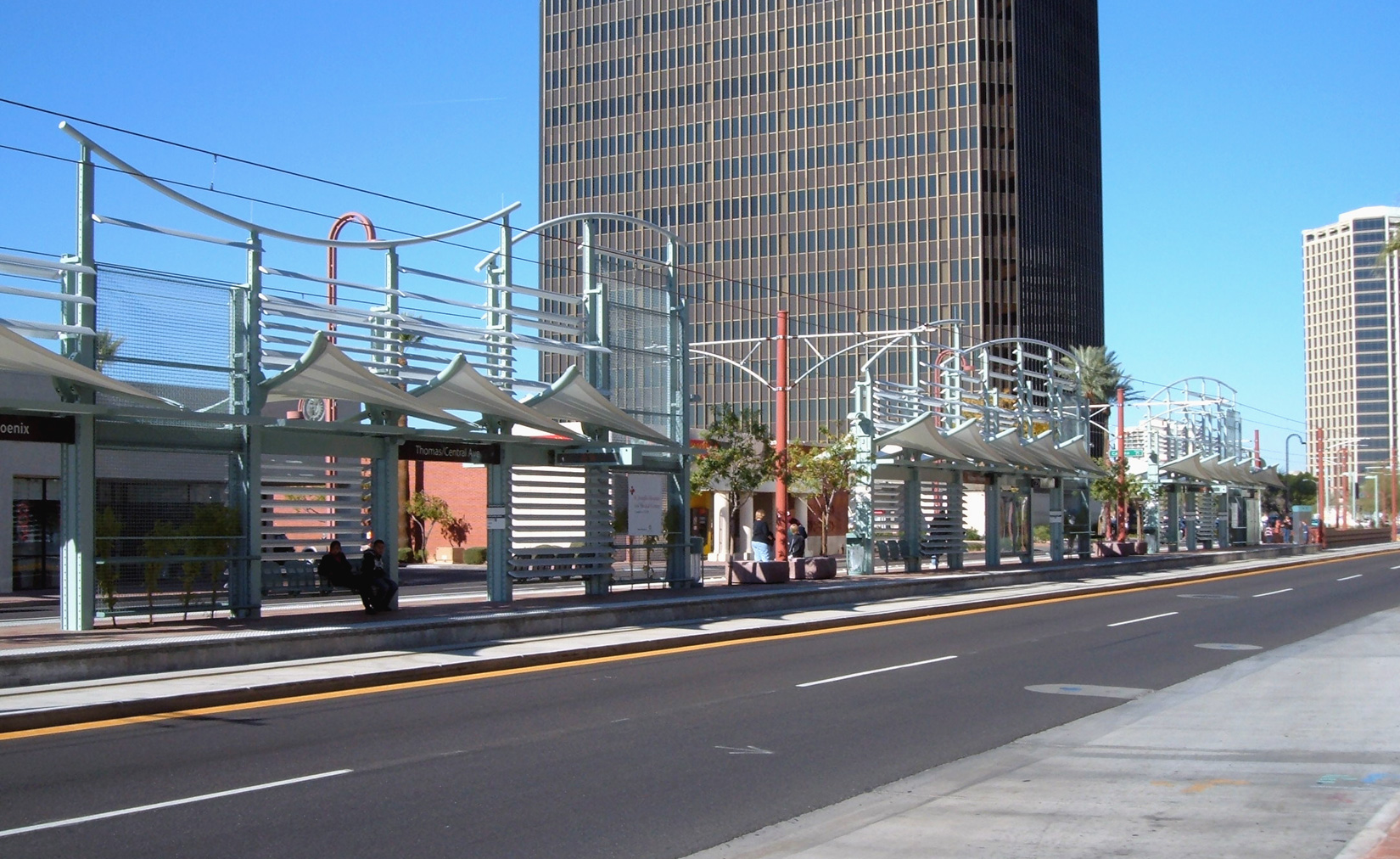
- The station in December 2008

General information
- Other names: Midtown Phoenix, Creighton University
- Location: Central Avenue and Thomas Road, Phoenix, Arizona; United States
- Coordinates: 33°28′52″N 112°4′25.50″W
- Owner: Valley Metro
- Operator: Valley Metro Rail & Streetcar
- Platforms: 1 island platform
- Tracks: 2
- Connections: Valley Metro Bus: 0, 29

Construction
- Structure type: At-grade
- Accessible: Yes

Other information
- Station code: 10008

History
- Opened: December 27, 2008

Services
Preceding station	Valley Metro	Following station
Osborn/Central Avenue toward Metro Parkway	B Line	Encanto/Central Avenue toward Baseline/Central Avenue
Location

Thomas/Central Avenue station, also known as Midtown Phoenix, is a light rail station on the B Line of the Valley Metro Rail & Streetcar system in Phoenix, Arizona, United States. The station is north of Thomas Road. It can be accessed from both Thomas Road, at the south, and Catalina Drive, two blocks to the north. Catalina Drive is the south-boundary street for Park Central Mall.

== Ridership ==
Weekday rail passengers
Year	In	Out	Average daily in	Average daily out
2009	354,960	365,857	1,397	1,440
2010	400,240	403,051	1,582	1,593

== Nearby places ==
- Dignity Health St. Joseph's Hospital and Medical Center
- Park Central Mall
- Phoenix Plaza
