= Encanto Park =

Public park in Phoenix, Arizona

Coordinates: 33°28′28.4″N 112°05′20.2″W

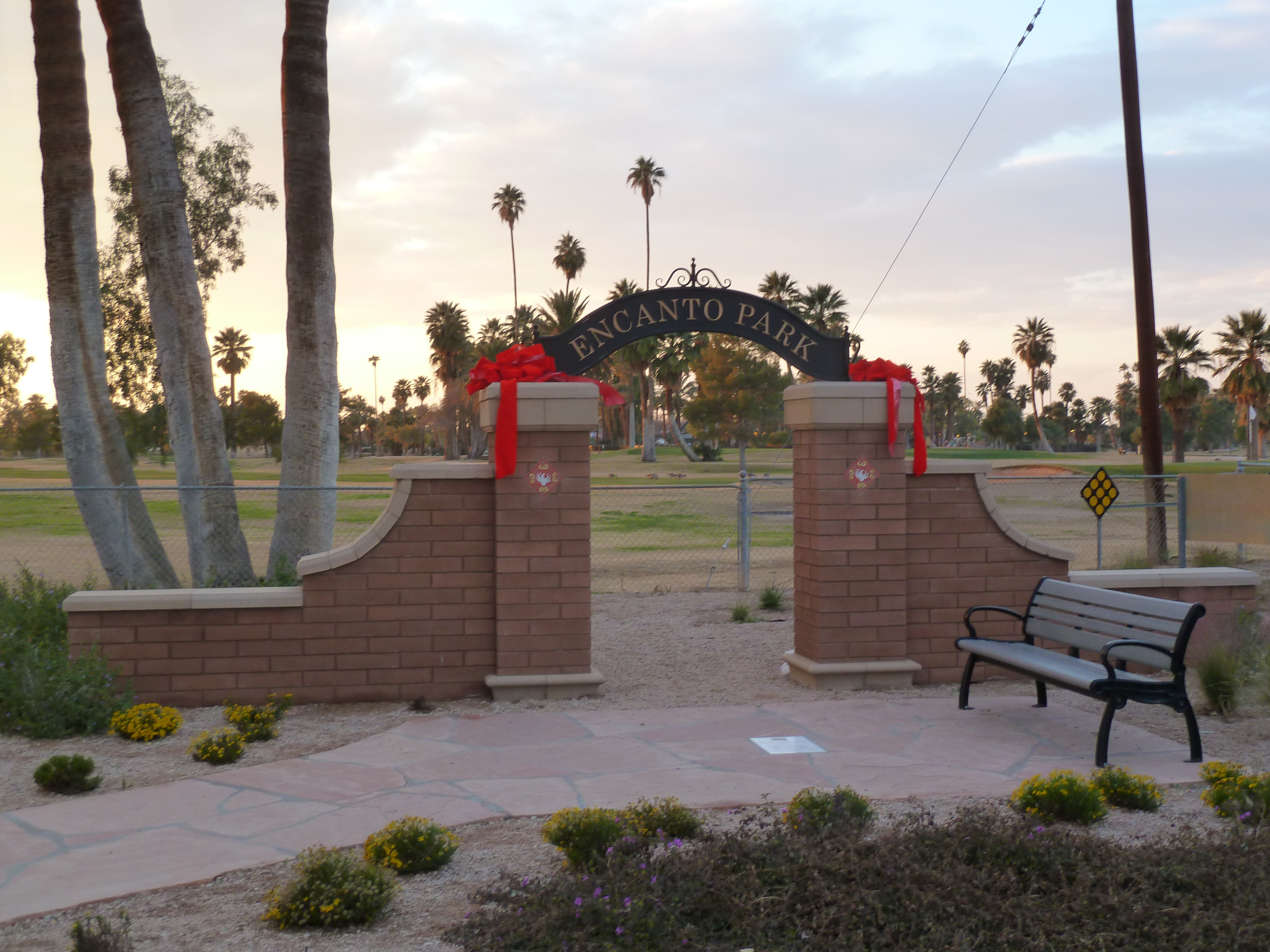
- Interactive map of Encanto Park
- Location: 2605 N 15th Ave, Phoenix, AZ 85007

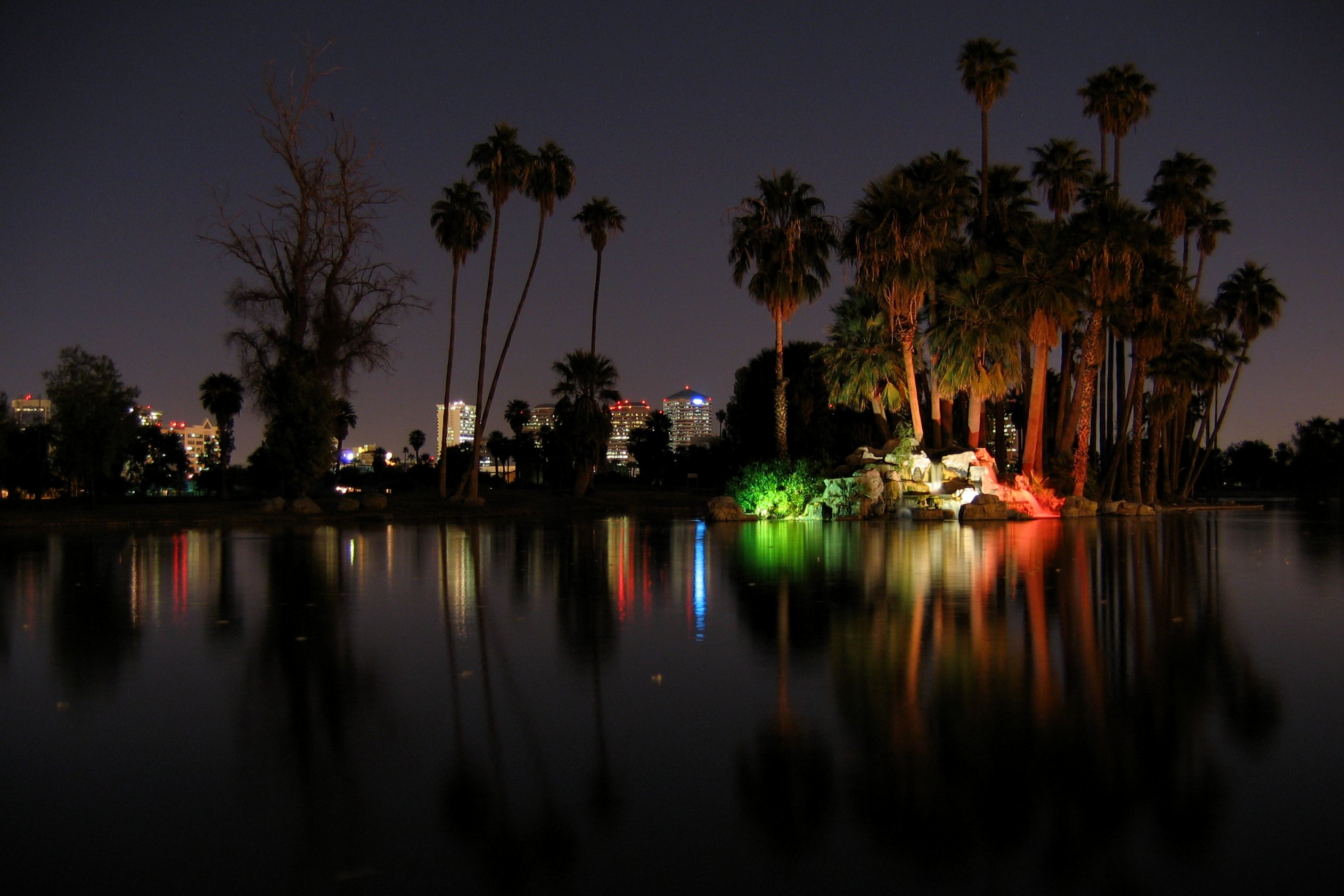
Encanto Park waterfall at night

Encanto Park is a 222 acres (90 ha) public park in central Phoenix, Arizona consisting of picnic areas, a lagoon for fishing, a boat house, swimming pool, nature trail, miniature amusement park, and two golf courses. The lagoon is approximately 7.5 acres (0.030 km^{2}) in and approximately 6 feet (1.8 m) deep. The park is bounded by Thomas Road on the north, Encanto Boulevard on the south, 15th Avenue on the west and 7th Avenue on the east; its surface elevation is 1,100 ft (340 m). With miniature amusement park within a park Enchanted Island, offers rides, games, concessions, and a miniature railroad which circumnavigates the area.. Encanto Park has been designated as a Phoenix Point of Pride.

== History ==
The Encanto area become a City of Phoenix park in 1934. The property was purchased from J. W. Doris 100 acres (40 ha) and Dr. Norton, amongst others; the quitclaim deed took effect November 27, 1934 and it was re-classified as a park (initially to curtail livestock grazing). By 1955 the Encanto Park Brochure hosted activities such as archery, tennis, badminton and other games. The Phoenix Parks and Recreation Department in the '70s promoted archery competitions in particular. In 1985, more outdoors facilities were added catering to increased societal interest in physical fitness and games with a focus was on soccer and handball, leaving archery to one side. Bike paths and jogging trails were also installed. These sundry improvements and others were made to the “south side” by way of 1979 and 1984 bonds totaling $1.3M

== See also ==
- List of historic properties in Phoenix, Arizona
