= Campbell/Central Avenue station =

Light rail station in Phoenix, Arizona

Campbell/Central Ave
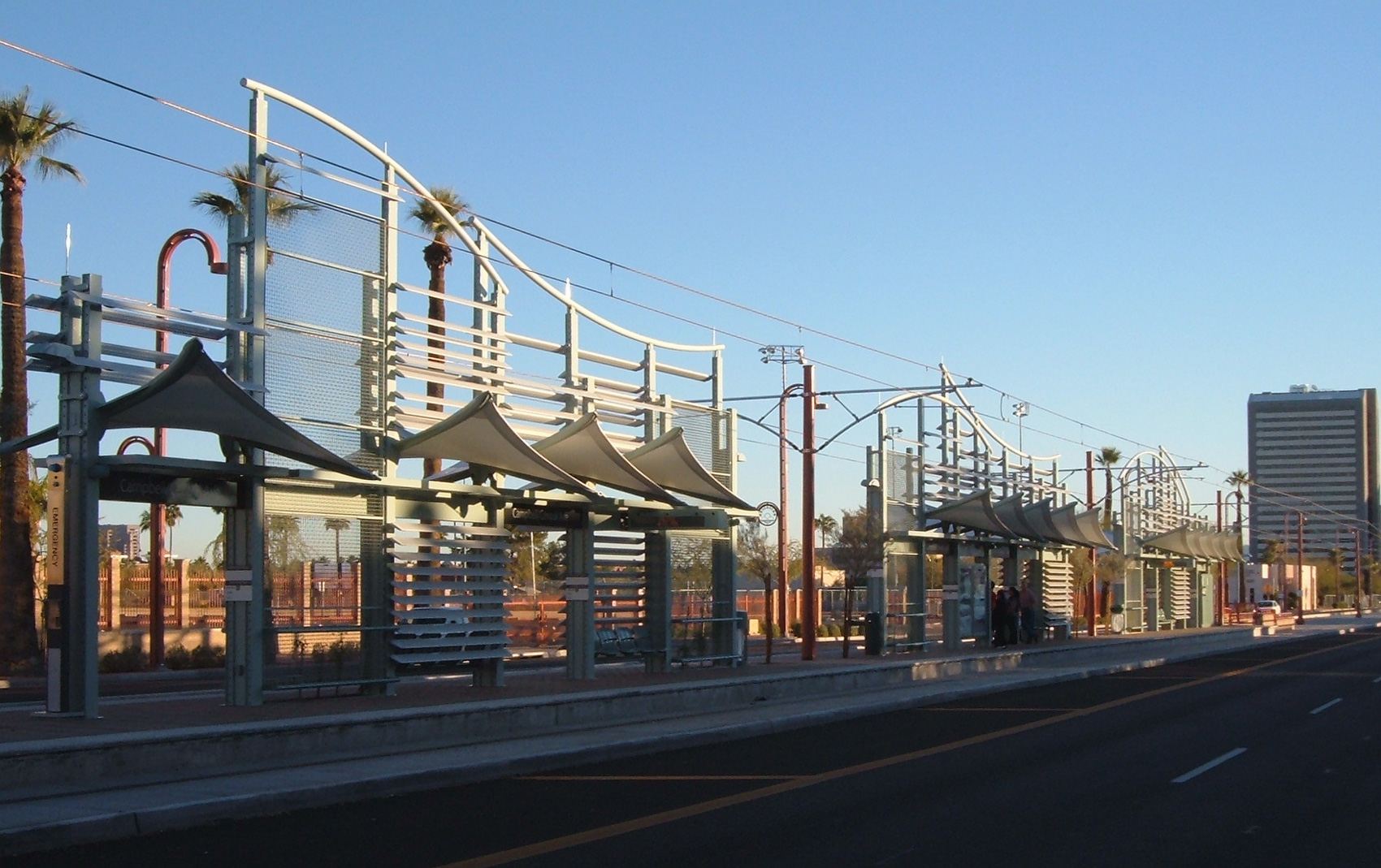
- The station in December 2008

General information
- Location: Central Avenue and Campbell Avenue, Phoenix, Arizona; United States
- Coordinates: 33°30′5″N 112°4′25.50″W
- Owner: Valley Metro
- Operator: Valley Metro Rail & Streetcar
- Platforms: 1 island platform
- Tracks: 2
- Connections: Valley Metro Bus: 0

Construction
- Structure type: At-grade
- Accessible: Yes

Other information
- Station code: 10005

History
- Opened: December 27, 2008

Services
Preceding station	Valley Metro	Following station
Central Avenue/Camelback toward Metro Parkway	B Line	Indian School/Central Avenue toward Baseline/Central Avenue
Location

Campbell/Central Avenue station is a station on the B Line of the Valley Metro Rail & Streetcar system in Phoenix, Arizona, United States.

== Notable places nearby ==
- Central High School
- Brophy College Preparatory
- Xavier College Preparatory

== Ridership ==
Weekday rail passengers
Year	In	Out	Average daily in	Average daily out
2009	226,83	239,548	893	943
2010	304,277	316,986	1,203	1,253
