= Patriots Square Park =

Park in Phoenix, Arizona

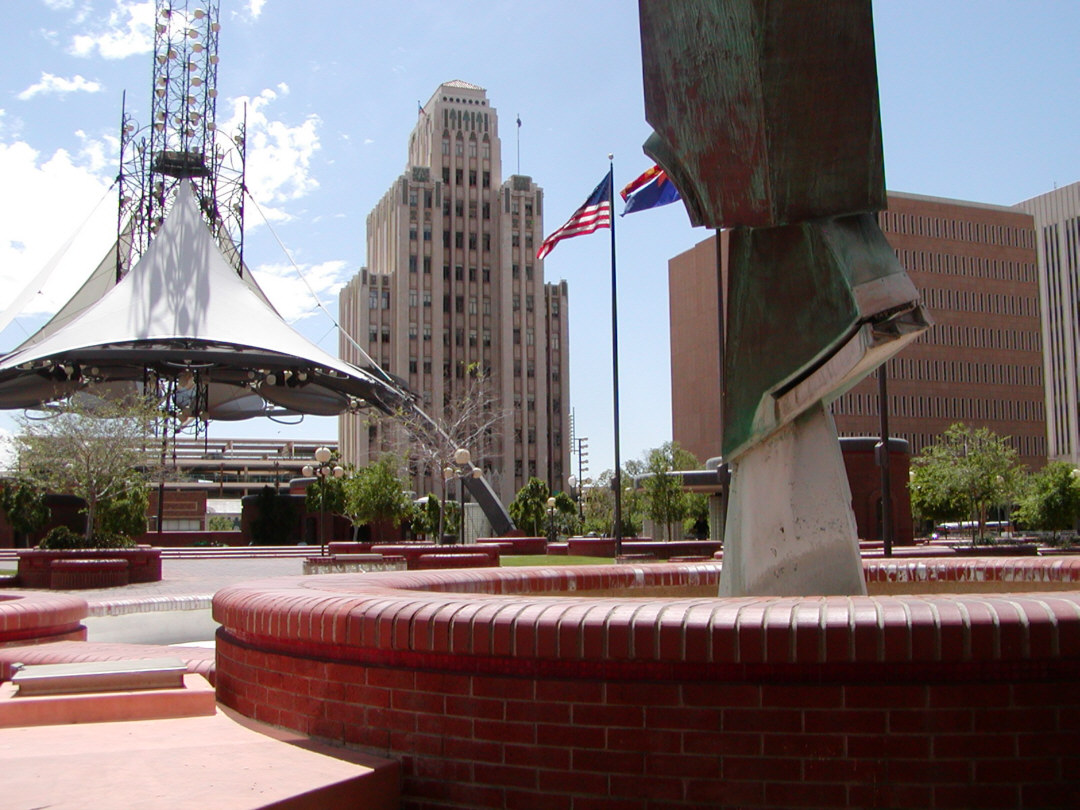
- Interactive map of Patriots Square Park
- Type: Urban Park
- Location: Phoenix, Arizona, U.S.
- Coordinates: 33°26′52″N 112°4′28″W
- Area: 2.5 acres (1.0 ha)

Patriots Square Park was an urban park located in downtown Phoenix, Arizona. The space has been redeveloped as part of the larger CityScape office and retail project; large portions of the park were demolished as of the spring of 2009. Before the CityScape project broke ground in the fall of 2007, Patriots Square Park was a 2.5 acre (1 hectare) mixed-use park containing open space, an outdoor performing arts stage, and food concessions. The park also served as a decorative cover for a public parking structure located underground which still remains and is in use.

Patriots Square Park was the location of a number of community celebrations such as the Arizona Asian Festival and Cinco de Mayo celebrations. The park is also listed as one of the Phoenix Points of Pride. It was originally constructed in 1976 and named in honor of the fighters of the American Revolutionary War, and redesigned in 1988 by Alexander and Associates, including the parking structure. In the years between then and the CityScape project, the space fell into slight disrepair and was frequented by transients.

== Redevelopment ==
Often maligned as being underused and forgotten, Patriots Square Park became a fixture in local news in 2006 when RED Development's ambitious CityScape plan was expanded to include the park, approved by the Phoenix city council. The CityScape project is a large-scale urban redevelopment project that includes retail, hotels and high-rise construction.

Initial reports of the park being subsumed into the private project were met with sharp criticism, with angry residents raising objections over the city's actions. In spite of official statements claiming the plan was key to revitalizing the park, residents rallied against the perceived loss of park-space, and forced RED Development and the city to redraw the plans, unveiled at a public forum. Reaction to the redesign, while viewed as a minor victory by some opponents, was still largely negative.

The park officially re-opened on November 4, 2010, with a free concert over two days headlined by Macy Gray and Third Eye Blind.
