= CityScape (Phoenix) =

High-rise development in Phoenix, Arizona

CityScape Phoenix
- Location within Arizona

General information
- Status: Completed
- Location: One East Washington; Phoenix, Arizona, United States
- Coordinates: 33°26′52.50″N 112°4′22.50″W
- Construction started: October 2008
- Completed: 2010 (Phase I), 2012 (Phase II)
- Cost: $900 Million USD (Overall Project)
- Owner: RED Development
- Operator: RED Development

Technical details
- Floor count: 27
- Floor area: 1,200,000 sq ft (110,000 m^{2})
- Lifts/elevators: 16

Design and construction
- Architect: Callison
- Developer: RED Development
- Main contractor: Hunt Construction Group

Other information
- Public transit: Downtown Phoenix Hub

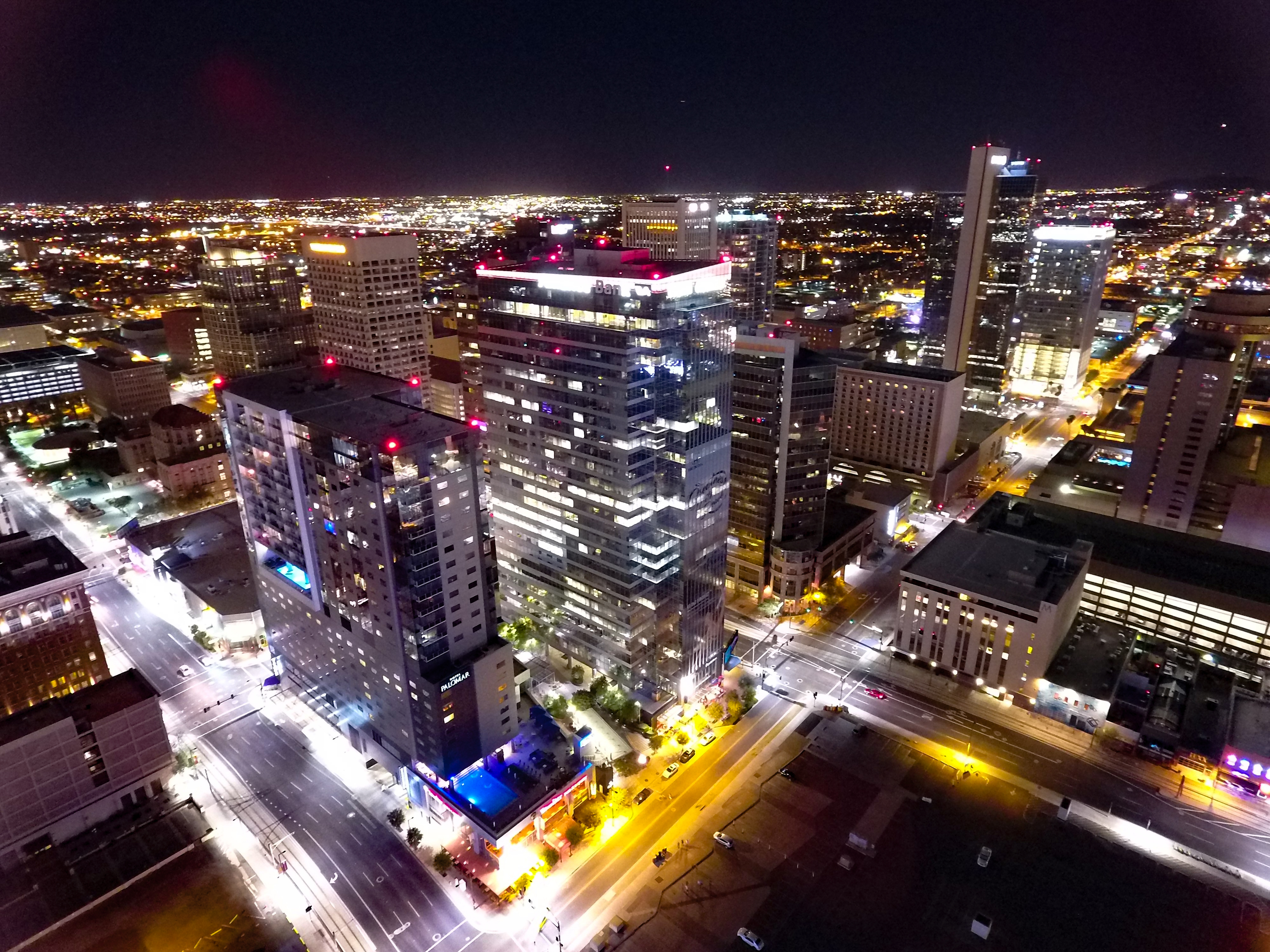
Hotel Palomar on Bottom Left, Overlooking Downtown Phoenix

CityScape Phoenix is a high-rise mixed-use development in Downtown Phoenix consisting of residential, retail, office, and hotel components. The development covers three city blocks in the heart of Downtown Phoenix and is located between First Avenue and First Street to the west and east, and between Washington and Jefferson streets to the north and south. A portion of the development was built on the land formerly occupied by Patriots Square Park through a redevelopment agreement with the City of Phoenix. It is centrally located in the heart of Downtown Phoenix, within walking distance of Mortgage Matchup Center, Chase Field, Arizona Financial Theatre, the Orpheum Theatre and the Phoenix Convention Center.

CityScape hosts a number of major events throughout the year, including the CitySkate Outdoor Holiday Ice Rink in the winter, the starting line for the P.F. Chang's Rock n’ Roll Arizona Marathon, the main stage for the Viva PHX Music Festival, and more.

== Alliance Bank Tower ==
Phase I of the development consists of a 27-story Class A office tower. The tower houses a number of corporate offices and law firms, including major tenants Western Alliance Bank and UnitedHealth Group#UnitedHealthcare.

== Hotel/residential tower ==
The adjacent high-rise tower has a dual purpose. The first 10 floors of the tower houses the 242-room boutique Kimpton's Hotel Palomar Phoenix. Hotel Palomar opened in July 2012. Floors 11 through 24 house the CityScape Residences. The Residences offer 224 luxury apartments with penthouse units gracing the top floors.

== Retail ==
CityScape has over a dozen restaurants, bars, or other food shops. There are also a small number of entertainment, fitness, and other retail outlets.

== Parking and transportation ==
In addition to street parking, CityScape offers two underground garages, one under the office tower and one beneath the retail (west) block, and valet parking.

CityScape is located on the Valley Metro Rail with stops located at the intersections of Washington Street and Central Avenue, as well as Jefferson and first Avenue.

== Awards ==
In February 2012, CityScape received a DREAMR Award. The Downtown Phoenix Partnership honored people, projects and businesses that are helping revitalize Downtown Phoenix.

CityScape Phase I won a Best of 2010 award in the Office category of the Southwest Contractor’s annual awards competition.

== See also ==
- List of tallest buildings in Arizona
- List of tallest buildings in Phoenix
