= Indian School/Central Avenue station =

Light rail station in Phoenix, Arizona

Indian School/Central Ave
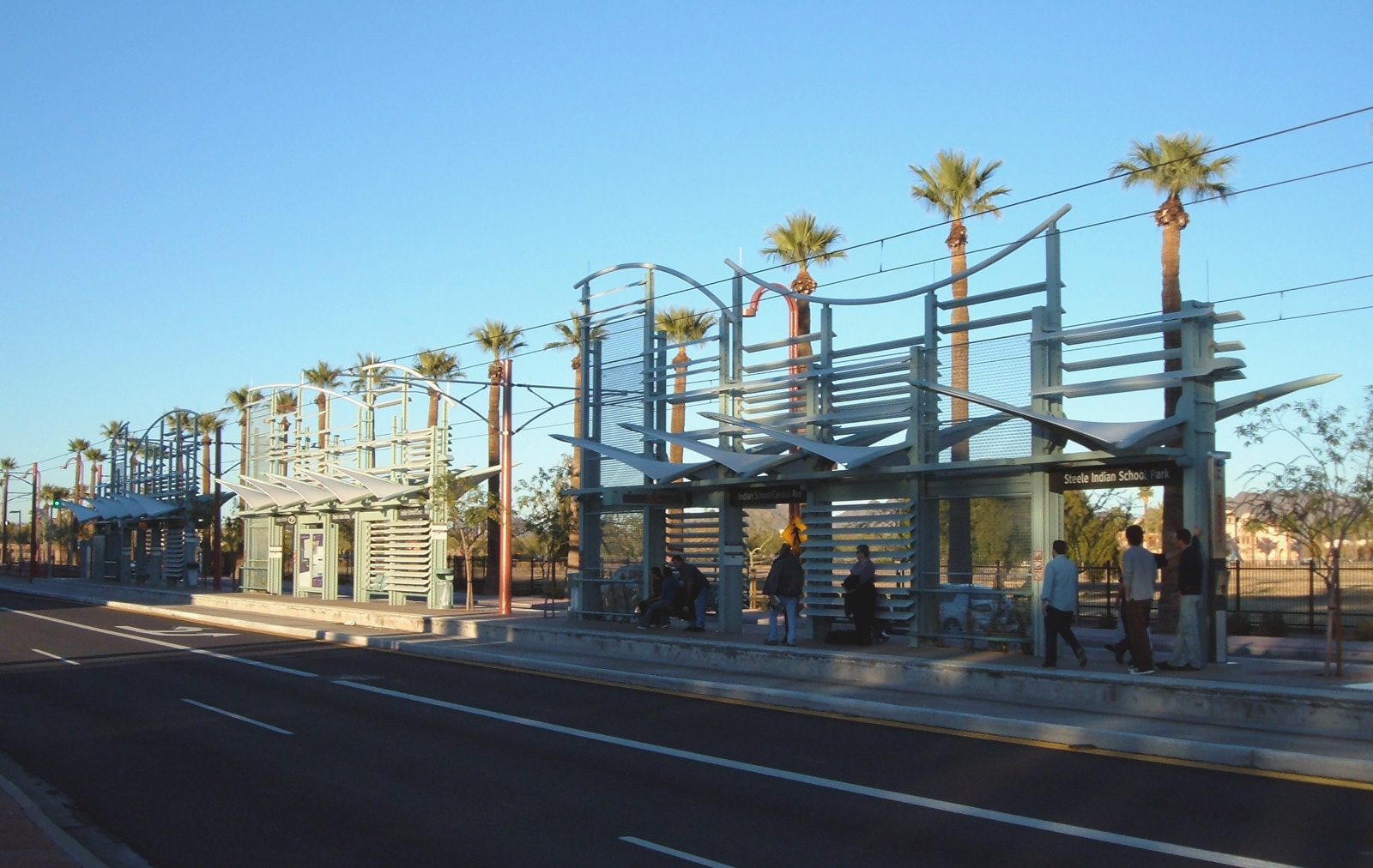
- The station in December 2008

General information
- Other names: Steele Indian School Park
- Location: Central Avenue and Indian School Road, Phoenix, Arizona; United States
- Coordinates: 33°29′44″N 112°4′25.50″W
- Owner: Valley Metro
- Operator: Valley Metro Rail & Streetcar
- Platforms: 1 island platform
- Tracks: 2
- Connections: Valley Metro Bus: 0, 41

Construction
- Structure type: At-grade
- Accessible: Yes

Other information
- Station code: 10006

History
- Opened: December 27, 2008

Services
Preceding station	Valley Metro	Following station
Campbell/Central Avenue toward Metro Parkway	B Line	Osborn/Central Avenue toward Baseline/Central Avenue
Location

Indian School/Central Avenue station, also known as Steele Indian School Park, is a station on the B Line of the Valley Metro Rail & Streetcar system in Phoenix, Arizona, United States.

== Notable places nearby ==
- Steele Indian School Park at the site of the Phoenix Indian School
- Phoenix Central Neighborhood
- Carl T. Hayden VA Medical Center
- Kindred Hospital Phoenix
- Phoenix City Square
- Grand Canal

== Ridership ==
Weekday rail passengers
Year	In	Out	Average daily in	Average daily out
2009	312,34	320,207	1,230	1,261
2010	366,213	365,023	1,447	1,443
