= Osborn/Central Avenue station =

Light rail station in Phoenix, Arizona

Osborn/Central Ave
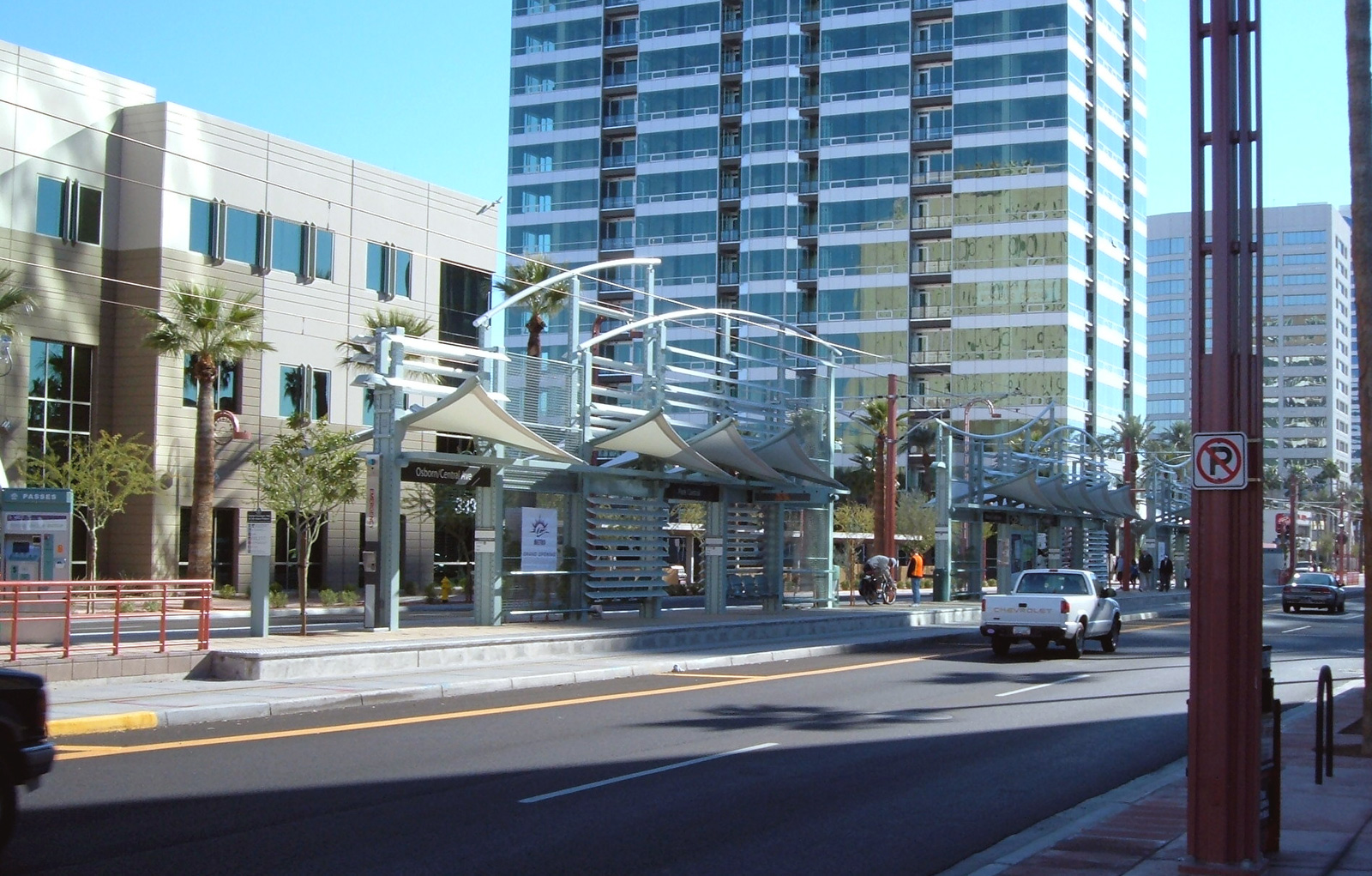
- The station in December 2008

General information
- Other names: Park Central
- Location: Central Avenue and Osborn Road, Phoenix, Arizona; United States
- Coordinates: 33°29′12″N 112°4′25.50″W
- Owner: Valley Metro
- Operator: Valley Metro Rail & Streetcar
- Platforms: 1 island platform
- Tracks: 2
- Connections: Valley Metro Bus: 0

Construction
- Structure type: At-grade
- Accessible: Yes

Other information
- Station code: 10007

History
- Opened: December 27, 2008

Services
Preceding station	Valley Metro	Following station
Indian School/Central Avenue toward Metro Parkway	B Line	Thomas/Central Avenue toward Baseline/Central Avenue
Location

Osborn/Central Avenue station, also known as Park Central, is a station on the B Line of the Valley Metro Rail & Streetcar system in Phoenix, Arizona, United States.

== Nearby places ==
- Phoenix Central Neighborhood
- Phoenix Financial Center
- Park Central Mall
- St. Joseph's Hospital and Medical Center
- Phoenix Corporate Center

== Ridership ==
Weekday rail passengers
Year	In	Out	Average daily in	Average daily out
2009	199,75	188,723	786	743
2010	210,59	210,606	832	832
