= Margaret T. Hance Park =

Park in Phoenix, Arizona, US

Coordinates: 33°27′42″N 112°04′33″W

- Interactive map of Margaret T. Hance Park
- Type: Urban Park
- Location: Phoenix, Arizona
- Area: 32 acres

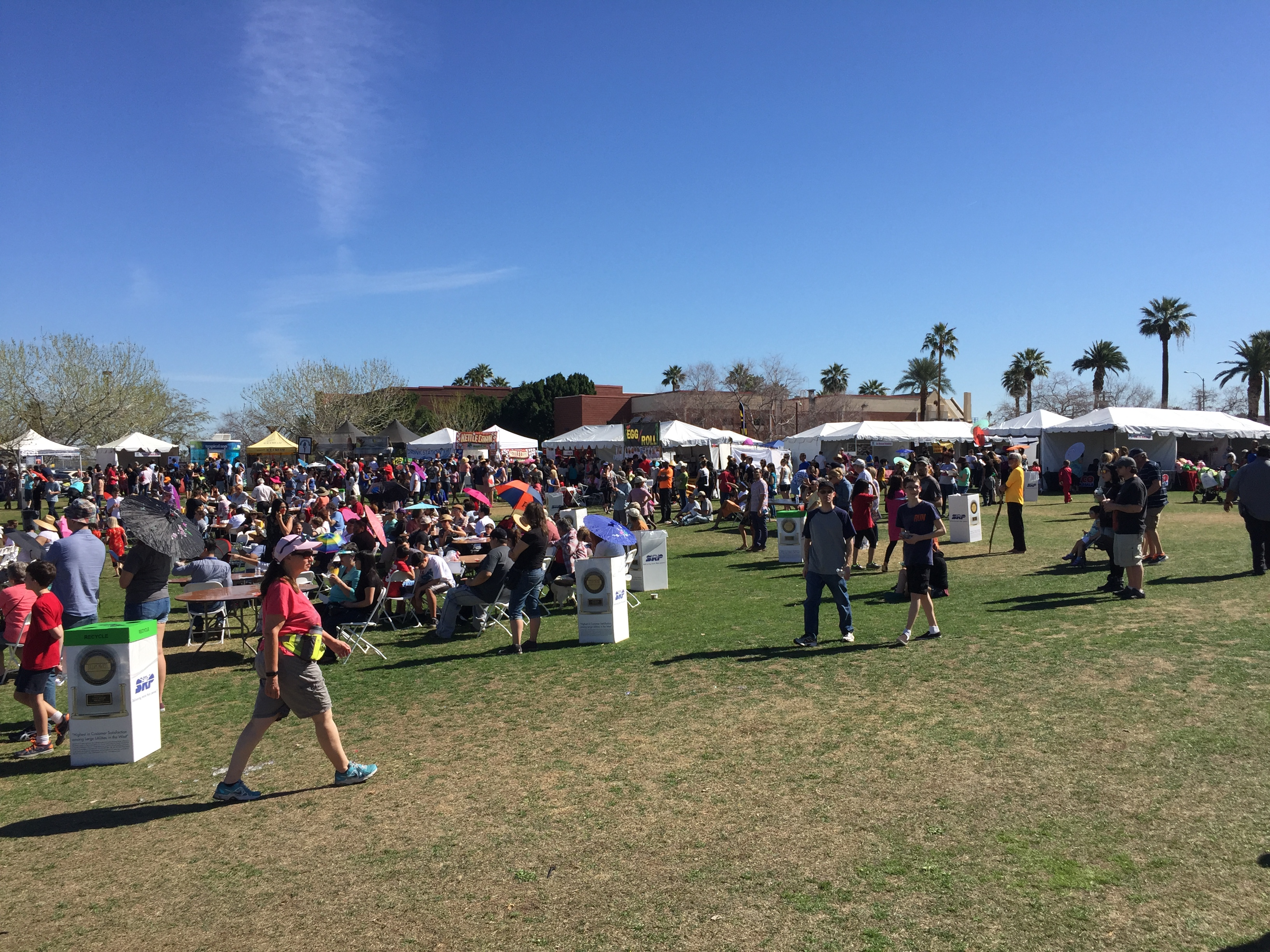
The Phoenix Chinese Festival on the eastern end of the park, in 2016

Margaret T. Hance Park is a public park above the Deck Park Tunnel in Phoenix, Arizona, United States. It is named after Margaret Hance, who was the first female mayor of the city and advocate for the park. The park is located next to the Burton Barr Library, Phoenix Center For The Arts, Japanese Friendship Garden (or Rohō-en), Irish Cultural Center and McClellan Library, Cutler Plotkin Jewish Heritage Center, and Kenilworth Elementary School.

== History ==
The park opened in 1992, two years after the completion of the tunnel.

=== Revitalization Project ===
In 2014, the City of Phoenix first announced its plans to 'revitalize' Hance Park. The goal was to transform Hance Park into a landmark park in Phoenix's Downtown core, similar to urban parks in other cities such as New York's Central Park or Chicago's Millennium Park. Proposed changes included the addition of a skate park, amphitheatre, restaurant, zip-line, splash pad, coffee bar, beer garden, dog park and more. Although completed before the announcement of the Hance Park Revitalization project, the Hance Dog Park, which opened in October 2013, could be considered the first of these planned improvements. In 2016, the City of Phoenix revealed their first Hance Park Master plan. It was announced that the park would undergo a ten-year $118 million face lift, which would add an Amphitheatre and skate park, amongst other things. It was also determined that two historic trolleys would be moved from their current spot at the Phoenix Trolley Museum to an unknown location.
