= Deck Park Tunnel =

Tunnel in Phoenix, Arizona

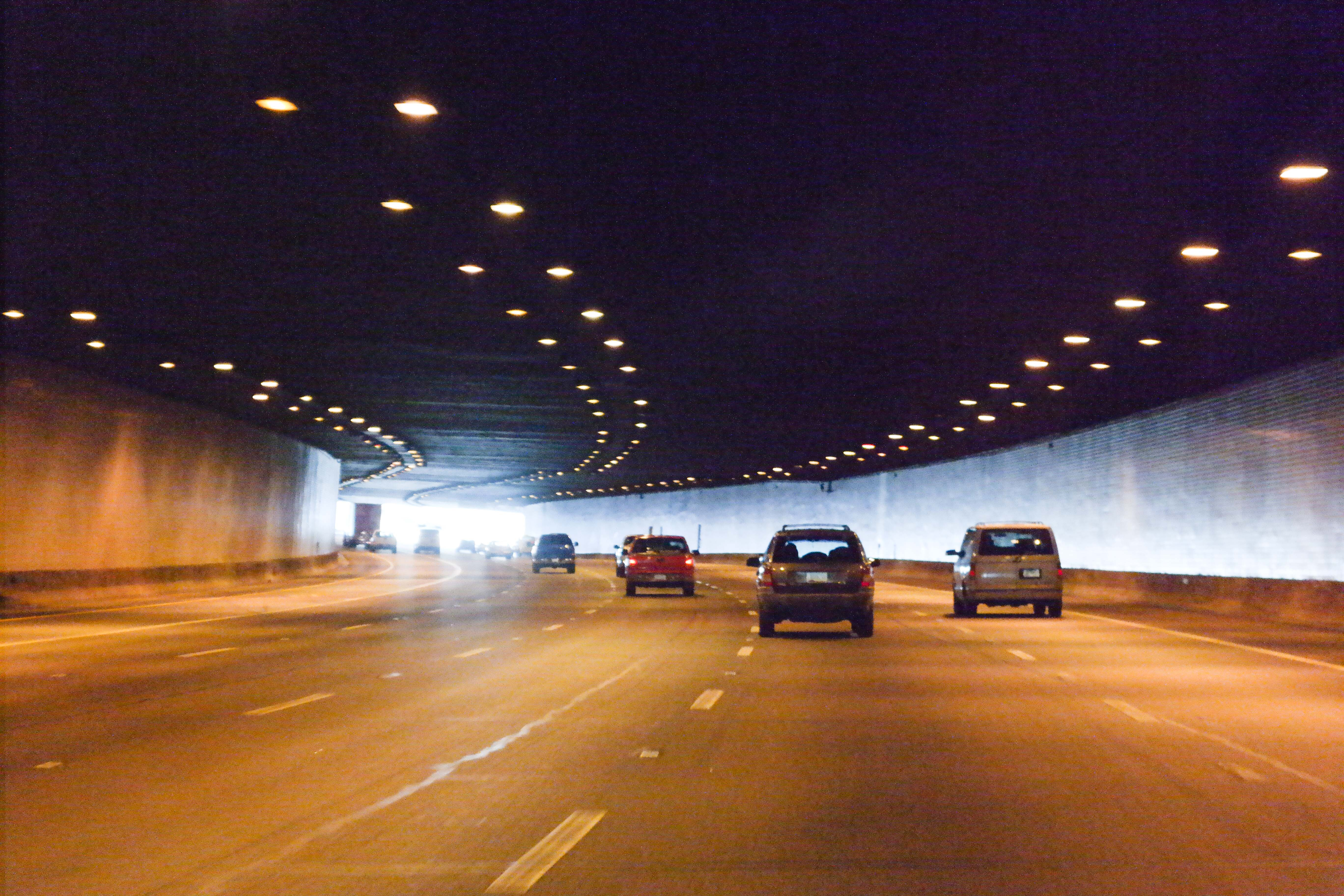
- Eastbound lanes near tunnel exit
- Interactive map of Deck Park Tunnel

Overview
- Official name: Dean Lindsey Memorial Tunnel
- Other name: Papago Freeway Tunnel
- Location: Margaret T. Hance Park, Phoenix, Arizona
- Coordinates: 33.462058°N 112.07252°W
- Route: I-10

Operation
- Opened: August 10, 1990
- Operator: Arizona Department of Transportation
- Vehicles per day: 225,000

Technical
- Length: 2,887 ft (880 m)
- No. of lanes: 10 (5 westbound, 5 eastbound) plus 1 unused gated tunnel for city buses / emergency vehicles

The Dean Lindsey Memorial Tunnel, better known to Phoenix residents as the Deck Park Tunnel, is a vehicular underpass built underneath Downtown Phoenix. It was built as part of Interstate 10 in Phoenix, Arizona.

== Route ==
The underpass extends from approximately North 3rd Avenue to North 3rd Street. At 2,887 feet (880 m), it ranks as the 42nd longest vehicular tunnel in the United States. The underpass was the last section of Interstate 10 to be completed nationwide. There is a plaque dedicated to the commemoration of the tunnel in Margaret T. Hance Park, which sits above the structure.

== History ==
Voters in Arizona voted down a similar plan to build the tunnel in 1975, after voting down a proposal for a raised highway through Downtown Phoenix in 1973. Plans for the Deck Park Tunnel were finally approved by voters in 1979, and construction began in 1983.

The tunnel was opened to traffic on August 10, 1990, following a three-day open house that attracted 100,000 people.

The tunnel was originally named the Papago Freeway Tunnel, but was renamed the Dean Lindsey Memorial Tunnel on May 7, 2024 in honor of the late civil engineer who oversaw the project.

== Design ==
ADOT officials concede the term "tunnel", in this case, is a misnomer, because it is actually a series of 19 side-by-side bridge overpasses. The term, however, is now deeply rooted in local vocabulary.

The bridges over the tunnel are about 150 feet (46 m) to 250 feet (76 m) long.

The tunnel is divided into two tubes, each carrying five lanes of one-way traffic flanked by two emergency lanes. Each of the two tubes can carry up to 16,000 vehicles per hour.

=== Unused bus lanes ===
Between the two tubes exists a tube containing two lanes, designed as an express transit terminal for city buses. The terminal was originally planned to be built next to the Central Avenue bridge over Margaret T. Hance Park. Passengers disembarking at the terminal would take an escalator or an elevator to the surface, and continue their journey.

While the bus lanes were built, the City of Phoenix was unable to secure the over $20 million needed in Federal Government funds to complete the project.

The tube is unused except as a lane for emergency vehicles, and the approaches on both sides of the tunnel are gated off.

== Ventilation and equipment ==
In times of heavy traffic or in the event of a fire in the tube, fans can be started up to provide ventilation, in order to prevent the dangerous buildup of carbon monoxide.

There are eight fans and four fan rooms, and each fan can run anywhere from 250 to 700 horsepower. The fans are automatically turned on when air sensors in the tunnel are triggered, and can replace the tunnel's air in less than five minutes.

The underpass has a large diesel generator approximately 160 feet (50 m) east of the westbound entrance to the tunnel, ensuring that the lighting, video surveillance, and intercoms have continuous power even during an outage.

For the safety of motorists, emergency telephone cabinets are located every 150 feet (46 m) within the tunnel.
