= McClelland Irish Library =

City of Phoenix library

- 33.461104°N 112.074304°W
- Location: Phoenix, Arizona, US
- Type: Public library
- Established: 2012

Collection
- Size: 6000

Other information
- Website: www.azirishlibrary.org

The Irish Cultural Center and McClelland Irish Library is an Irish center and specialty Library situated in and owned by the city of Phoenix, Arizona holding a collection of works related to Celtic culture and genealogy. Beginning in 1999 with the An Gorta Mor (Great Hunger) Memorial, it then expanded to the Great Hall in 2003, Irish cottage in 2006, and Library in 2012.

The building housing the library cost $5 million to build and is modeled after a Norman castle. The library holds over 6,000 books about Irish culture and a collection of genealogy resources, and operates in conjunction with Phoenix Public Library.

== See also ==
- History of Ireland
