= Will Bruder =

American architect

- Born: 1946 (age 79–80); Milwaukee, Wisconsin, U.S.
- Education: University of Wisconsin–Milwaukee (B.F.A., 1969)
- Occupation: Architect
- Awards: 1987 Rome Prize, 2013 FAIA
- Practice: Will Bruder Architects
- Buildings: Burton Barr Central Library, Agave Library, Deer Valley Rock Art Center, Byrne Residence, Nevada Museum of Art.

Will Bruder (born 1946) is an American architect.

== Biography ==
Self-trained as an architect, Will Bruder received a Bachelor of Fine Arts in sculpture from the University of Wisconsin–Milwaukee, taking supplemental courses in structural engineering, philosophy, art history, and urban planning. Bruder was a student of Paolo Soleri, where he acquired field experience in woodwork, metal work, and masonry. In the summer of 1967, Bruder participated in Soleri's Silt Pile Workshop, and in 1968, he was an apprentice of Soleri at his Cosanti studio. Projects that he worked on during that time with Soleri include construction of the concrete vaults of the main drafting room, the 3D Jersey Project, and Soleri's book Arcology: The City in the Image of Man. After graduating from college in 1969, Bruder spent a year as an apprentice of Gunnar Birkerts, where he aided in the design of the Contemporary Arts Museum Houston. In 1973, he obtained registration as an architect and opened his first studio in 1974. In 1987, he was a fellow at the American Academy in Rome.

In 2019 Will Bruder moved his practice from Phoenix, Arizona to Portland, Oregon.

== Selected works ==
=== Burton Barr Central Library ===
The Burton Barr Central Library in Phoenix, Arizona, is a five-story, 280,000-square-foot (26,000 m^{2}) building that houses an open, one-acre (4,000 m^{2}) reading room and a single, central open core providing vertical circulation. This central core, the "crystal canyon", is an atrium containing three high-speed elevators and a grand staircase. The building incorporates a roof inspired by Buckminster Fuller's tensegrity structures with motorized louvers on its south face for sun control. The reading room on the fifth floor has skylights that allow sunlight to shine directly onto the top of each corresponding column on solar noon of the summer solstice. In 2008, the library was chosen as one of the Phoenix Points of Pride, and in 2010, it received a LEED Existing Buildings Silver 2.0 designation. On May 7, 2021 the Burton Barr Central Library received the AIA 25 Year Award.

=== Temple Kol Ami ===
Completed in 1994, the Temple features stone masonry inspired by ancient communities in Israel.

=== Riddell Advertising Agency ===
The building takes inspiration from its natural surroundings in Jackson, Wyoming. A skylit atrium with three log columns centers the vertically organized building. The building includes office space, a presentation room, photography studio, library, and lunchroom.

=== Nevada Museum of Art ===
The exterior resembles Nevada's geography in the Black Rock Desert. The interior features an atrium that extends over four stories and a glass pavilion. The Reno museum was completed in 2003.

=== Loloma 5 ===
Five 1,540-square-foot mixed-use living/work structures are accented on the exterior with a perforated metal gate and bamboo/mesh fence. The building has a sustainable, desert design. In 2005, the multi-unit development received a Citation Award from AIA Western Mountain Region and a Merit Award from AIA Arizona.

=== Scottsdale Museum of Contemporary Art ===
Completed in Scottsdale, Arizona, in 1999, the museum is a retrofit of a former movie theater. It is minimalist in design with four galleries. The building has a James Turrell Skyspace Knight Rise. The exterior features the Scrim Wall by James Carpenter Design Associates.

=== Henkel North American Headquarters ===
Located on about five acres in Scottsdale, the Henkel Headquarters is a 348,000-square-foot, four-story structure. The “Cafetorium” serves as a meeting point for employees. The building also features a rooftop building. The building was awarded a LEED Silver rating because of its use of thermal and shading technologies, raised floor systems, and indirect lighting in office areas.

=== Agave Library ===
Completed in 2009, the 25,405-square-foot branch library is constructed of stacked bond concrete masonry units and glass enclosing a rectangular space with hard-trowelled concrete floors and sandblasted cmu walls. Situated in a suburban shopping center, the construction recalls the tradition of drive-in movie theaters common in post-war American suburbs. The library received the Landmark Library Award in 2011 and an Honor Award from AIA Arizona in 2010.

=== Other works ===
==== Public ====
- Phoenix Public Library Branches: Mesquite (1979), Cholla (1986), Agave (2009)
- Deer Valley Rock Art Center, Deer Valley, Arizona, 1994
- Hercules Public Library, Hercules, California, 2006
- Billings Public Library, Billings, Montana, 2015
- E.L. Cord Museum School, Reno, Nevada, 2014
- Billings Public Library, Billings, Montana, 2010–2013
- Bridget Hall, Mesa, Arizona, 2010
- Hercules Library, Hercules, California, 2006
- Teton County Library, Jackson, Wyoming, 1997

==== Commercial ====
- Mad River Boat Trips, Jackson, Wyoming, 1997
- Ingo Tasty Food, Phoenix, Arizona, 2013

==== Residential ====
- Hill-Sheppard Residence, Phoenix, Arizona, 1993
- Byrne Residence, Scottsdale, Arizona, 1998
- Sky Arc House, Marin County, California, 1999
- Pond House, Cave Creek, Arizona, 2002
- Riddell Residence, Wilson, Wyoming, 2002
- Bass Residence, Tucson, Arizona, 1994
- Desert Shield (Theuer Residence). Phoenix, Arizona, 1991.

== Awards ==
- 2013 FAIA in Design: Election to The College of Fellows, American Institute of Architects
- 2011 Residential Architect Leadership Award, Hall of Fame
- 2011 Landmark Library, Library Journal: Agave Library, Phoenix, Arizona
- 2010 Honor Award, AIA Arizona: Agave Library, Phoenix, Arizona
- 2010 Honor Award, AIA Arizona/Desert Living House of the Year: Jarson Residence, Paradise Valley, Arizona
- 2009 Residential Interior Award, IIDA Arizona Chapter: Feigin Residence, Reno, Nevada
- 2008 Architect of the Year, AIA Arizona
- 2000 Academy Award, American Academy of Arts and Letters
- 2000 Visionary Award of Excellence, AZ IFDA Awards and Honors
- 2000 Chrysler Design Award
- 1997 Award of Excellence, AIA/American Library Association: Phoenix Central Library, Phoenix, Arizona
- 1996 Educator of the Year Award, AIA Arizona
- 1987 Rome Prize, American Academy in Rome
