= Deer Valley, Phoenix =

Coordinates: 33.669021°N 112.113117°W

Deer Valley
- Urban village of Phoenix, Arizona
- Deer Valley Village
- Location of Deer Valley highlighted in red.
- Country: United States
- State: Arizona
- County: Maricopa
- City: Phoenix

Area
  - Total: 56.9 sq mi (147 km^{2})

Population (2010)
  - Total: 165,656
- Website: Deer Valley Village Planning Committee

Deer Valley is located in the city of Phoenix, Arizona, United States. As of 2010, the population was 165,656, 25% of whom were under 18 years of age. The origin of the name is unclear; it first appeared on a 1921 United States General Land Office map of the area describing the valley created by Skunk Creek.

== Geography ==
It is located in the northwestern portion of the city, and borders the cities of Glendale and Peoria. Within Phoenix, it borders four other urban villages (North Mountain, Paradise Valley, Desert View, and North Gateway). The village is 56.9 square miles (147 km^{2}) in size and is centered at Interstate 17 and Arizona Loop 101. The core of the village includes commercial, industrial, and multifamily housing developments. Outer areas have more lower density residential land.

Significant geographic features of the village include the volcanic Adobe Mountains and Hedgpeth Hills, Adobe Dam, Skunk Creek, and Scatter Wash.

== Climate ==
According to the Köppen Climate Classification system, Deer Valley has a hot desert climate, abbreviated "BWh" on climate maps. The hottest temperature recorded in Deer Valley was 117 °F (47.2 °C) on June 19, 2016 and June 20, 2017, while the coldest temperature recorded was 22 °F (−5.6 °C) on January 14, 2007.

Climate data for Deer Valley, Arizona (Phoenix Deer Valley Airport), 1991–2020 normals, extremes 1998–present
Month	Jan	Feb	Mar	Apr	May	Jun	Jul	Aug	Sep	Oct	Nov	Dec	Year
Record high °F (°C)	82 (28)	86 (30)	97 (36)	101 (38)	110 (43)	117 (47)	116 (47)	115 (46)	112 (44)	108 (42)	95 (35)	82 (28)	117 (47)
Mean maximum °F (°C)	77.0 (25.0)	80.0 (26.7)	88.1 (31.2)	96.7 (35.9)	102.4 (39.1)	111.3 (44.1)	112.5 (44.7)	110.9 (43.8)	106.3 (41.3)	97.3 (36.3)	87.9 (31.1)	76.2 (24.6)	114.0 (45.6)
Mean daily maximum °F (°C)	65.4 (18.6)	68.1 (20.1)	75.0 (23.9)	82.5 (28.1)	91.5 (33.1)	101.5 (38.6)	104.0 (40.0)	102.5 (39.2)	97.5 (36.4)	86.3 (30.2)	74.0 (23.3)	65.9 (18.8)	84.5 (29.2)
Daily mean °F (°C)	54.8 (12.7)	57.1 (13.9)	62.9 (17.2)	69.6 (20.9)	78.1 (25.6)	87.1 (30.6)	92.4 (33.6)	91.5 (33.1)	86.1 (30.1)	74.5 (23.6)	62.4 (16.9)	55.3 (12.9)	72.6 (22.6)
Mean daily minimum °F (°C)	44.1 (6.7)	46.1 (7.8)	50.9 (10.5)	56.6 (13.7)	64.7 (18.2)	72.7 (22.6)	80.8 (27.1)	80.5 (26.9)	74.7 (23.7)	62.7 (17.1)	50.8 (10.4)	44.7 (7.1)	60.8 (16.0)
Mean minimum °F (°C)	31.9 (−0.1)	34.7 (1.5)	40.9 (4.9)	46.2 (7.9)	53.9 (12.2)	64.7 (18.2)	72.1 (22.3)	72.2 (22.3)	64.4 (18.0)	50.9 (10.5)	39.1 (3.9)	32.0 (0.0)	29.9 (−1.2)
Record low °F (°C)	22 (−6)	24 (−4)	32 (0)	37 (3)	47 (8)	57 (14)	66 (19)	69 (21)	56 (13)	40 (4)	30 (−1)	28 (−2)	22 (−6)
Average precipitation inches (mm)	0.89 (23)	0.88 (22)	0.85 (22)	0.31 (7.9)	0.13 (3.3)	0.08 (2.0)	0.82 (21)	0.95 (24)	0.78 (20)	0.69 (18)	0.63 (16)	0.85 (22)	8.09 (205)
Average precipitation days (≥ 0.01 in)	3.9	3.8	3.0	1.8	1.0	0.5	3.8	4.5	2.9	2.7	2.6	4.1	34.6
Source 1: NOAA
Source 2: National Weather Service (mean maxima/minima 2006–2020)

== Employment ==
Within Deer Valley is approximately 9.3 million sq ft (0.86 m^{2}) of office space, 11.9 million sq ft (1.11 m^{2}) of industrial space, and 3 million sq ft (0.28 m^{2}) of mixed space. As of 2013, major employers were:

- Nokia Finland
- APSM Systems (Electromechanical Manufacturing)
- Honeywell International (Aerospace/Electrical Equipment)
- PetSmart (Retail, Corporate Headquarters)
- Safeway Stores (Customer Service Center)
- Cox Communications (Broadband Communications)
- American Express (Financial Services)
- Wells Fargo Home Equity (Call Center)
- Best Western International (Reservation Center)
- Discover Financial Services (Call Center)
- HonorHealth (Healthcare)

== Features and attractions ==
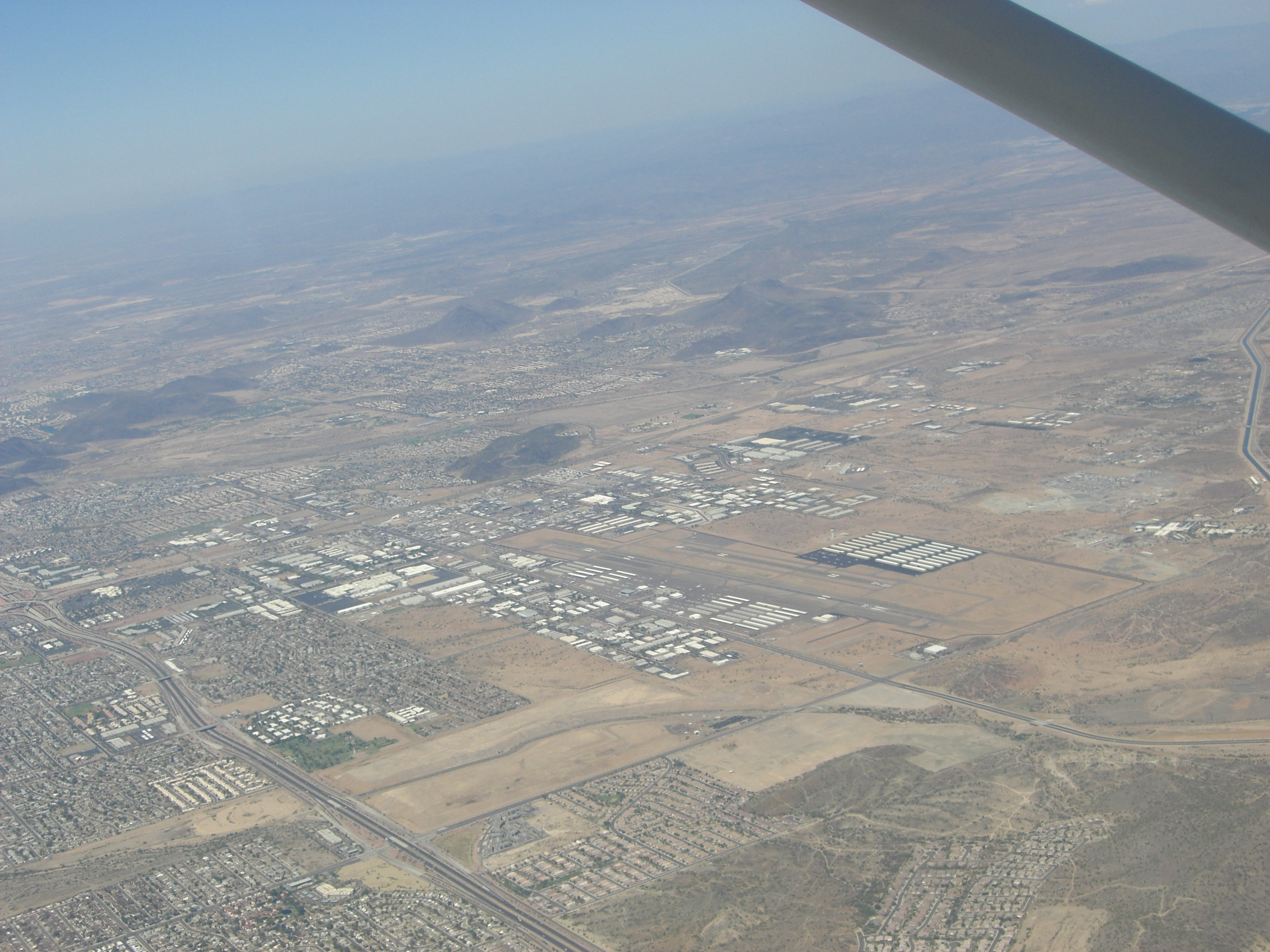
Deer Valley Airport

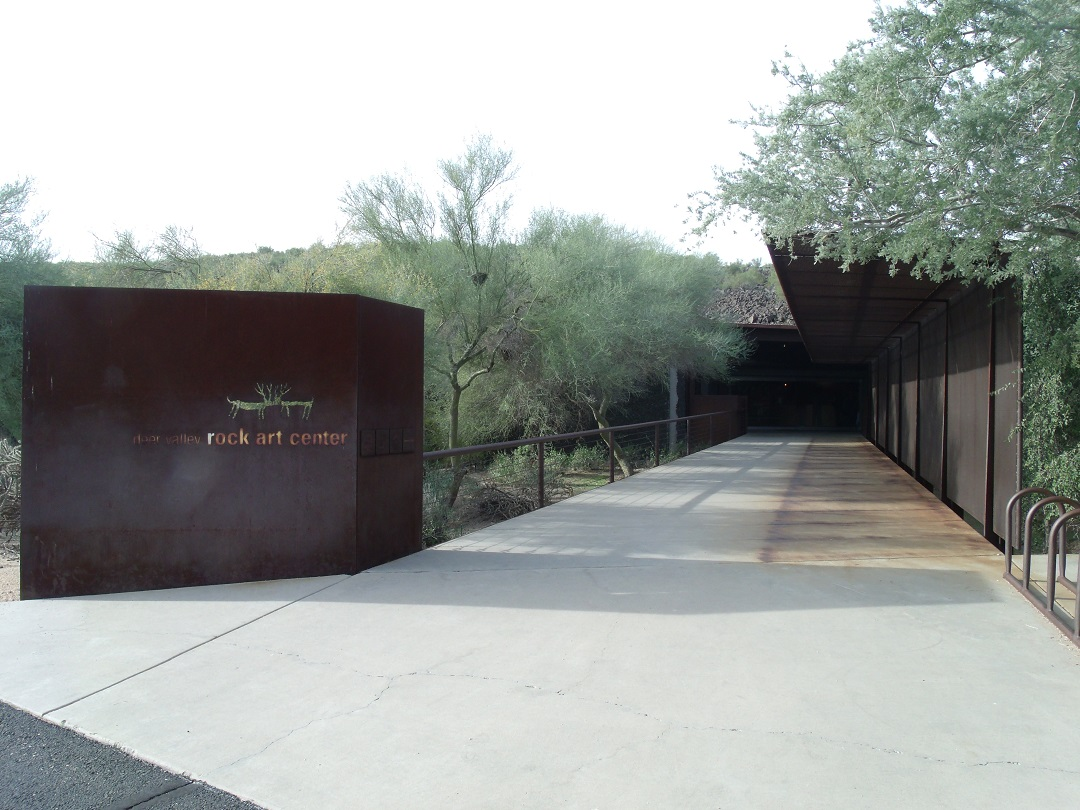
Deer Valley Petroglyph Preserve

Deer Valley Airport, one of the busiest general aviation airports in the country is located in the village. Turf Paradise, a horse racetrack and Wet'n'Wild Phoenix, a 35-acre (14 ha) waterpark and the Arizona's largest theme park are both located in Deer Valley.

The Central Arizona Project canal carrying water from the Colorado River at Lake Havasu to Phoenix and Tucson passes through the village. The Deer Valley Petroglyph Preserve, a 47-acre (19 ha) archaeological site containing over 1500 petroglyphs, listed on the National Register of Historic Places and as a Phoenix Points of Pride, is located just west of the village core.

The Adobe Dam Regional Park, a 1,514-acre (613 ha) Maricopa County park, is located here. The park is located behind Adobe Dam in an area primarily designated for flood control. The park includes a sports complex for softball and sand volleyball, a golf course, kart racing track, a radio-controlled aircraft flight facility serving an AMA-chartered model aircraft club, a paintball field, and a 44-acre (18 ha) large scale model railroad.

== Education ==
The Deer Valley Unified School District is much larger than the village, and includes several surrounding Phoenix urban villages, as well as parts of Glendale and Peoria. A small portion of the village south of Bell Road is in other school districts. The district has five high schools, two of which are located in the village, Barry Goldwater High School and Sandra Day O'Connor High School. The eponymous Deer Valley High School is located just outside the village boundary in Glendale.
