= Shemer Art Center and Museum =

Museum in Phoenix, Arizona

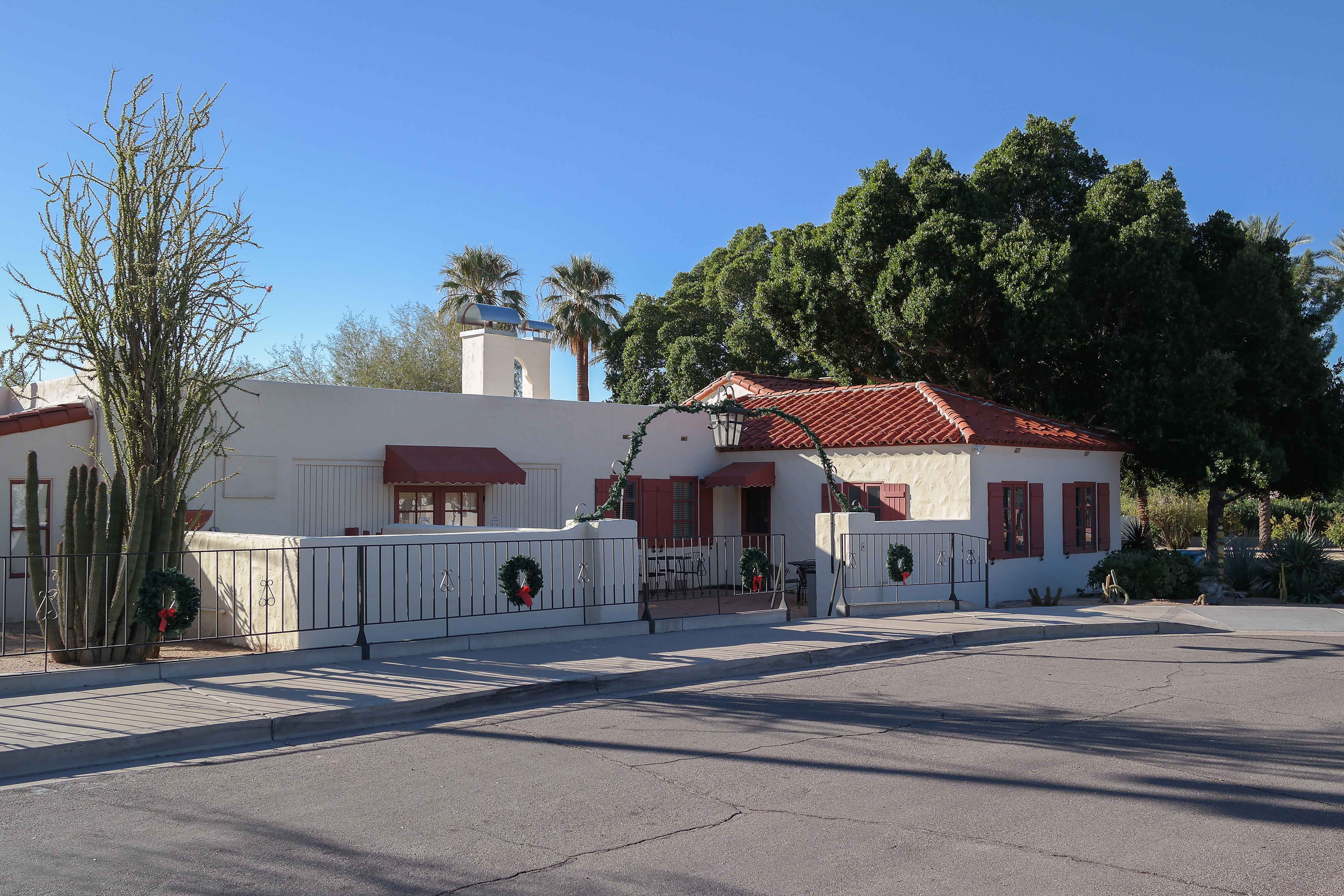
- The Shemer Art Center in 2013

General information
- Address: 5005 E. Camelback Road
- Town or city: Phoenix, Arizona
- Coordinates: 33°30′18″N 111°58′19″W
- Opened: 1984
- Owner: Phoenix Parks and Recreation Department; Shemer Art Center and Museum Association

The Shemer Art Center and Museum is an art education facility and gallery in Phoenix, Arizona. The center was founded in 1984 by Martha Shemer, who purchased a mission-style house and three acres not only to preserve the property but to donate it to the City of Phoenix to be used for art education. Budget constraints nearly closed the center in 2010, but citizens founded the Shemer Art Center and Museum Association to help manage and preserve the facility.

The Shemer Art Center and Museum is one of the Phoenix Points of Pride.
