= Kōko-en =

Japanese garden

Coordinates: 34°50′17″N 134°41′23″E

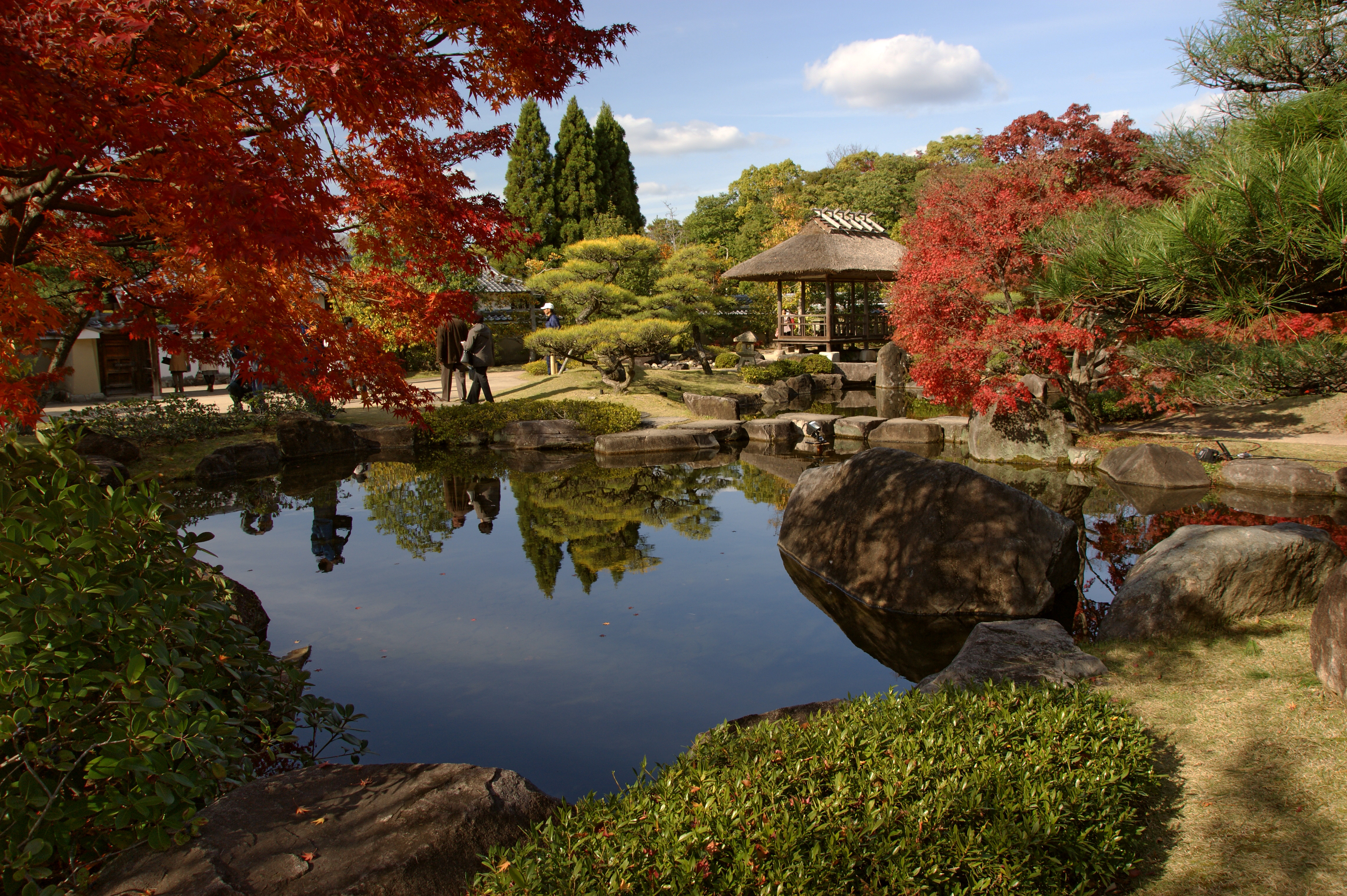
Kōko-en in Himeji

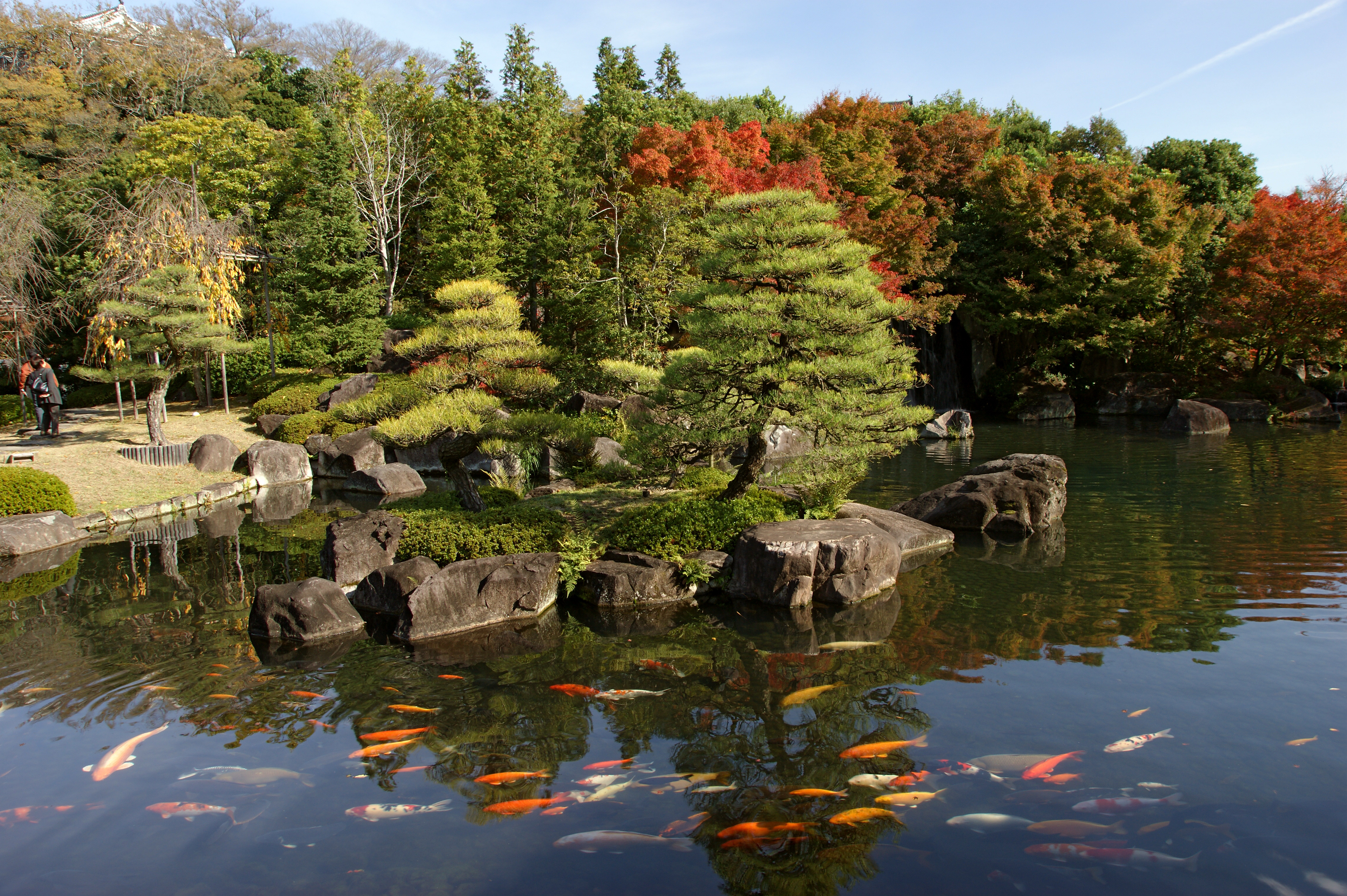
Koi carp in the pond

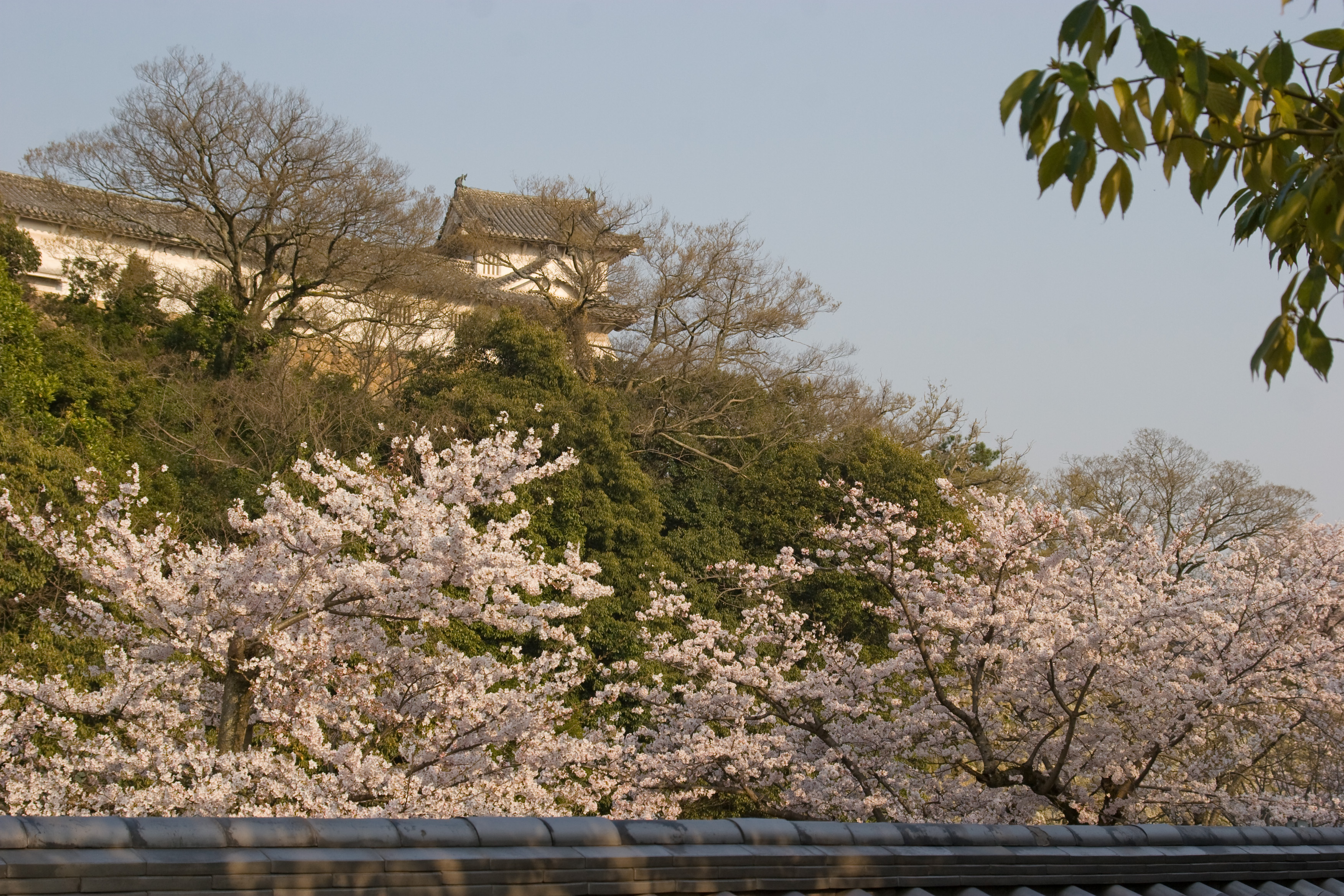
Sakura cherry blossoms with walls of Himeji Castle in the background

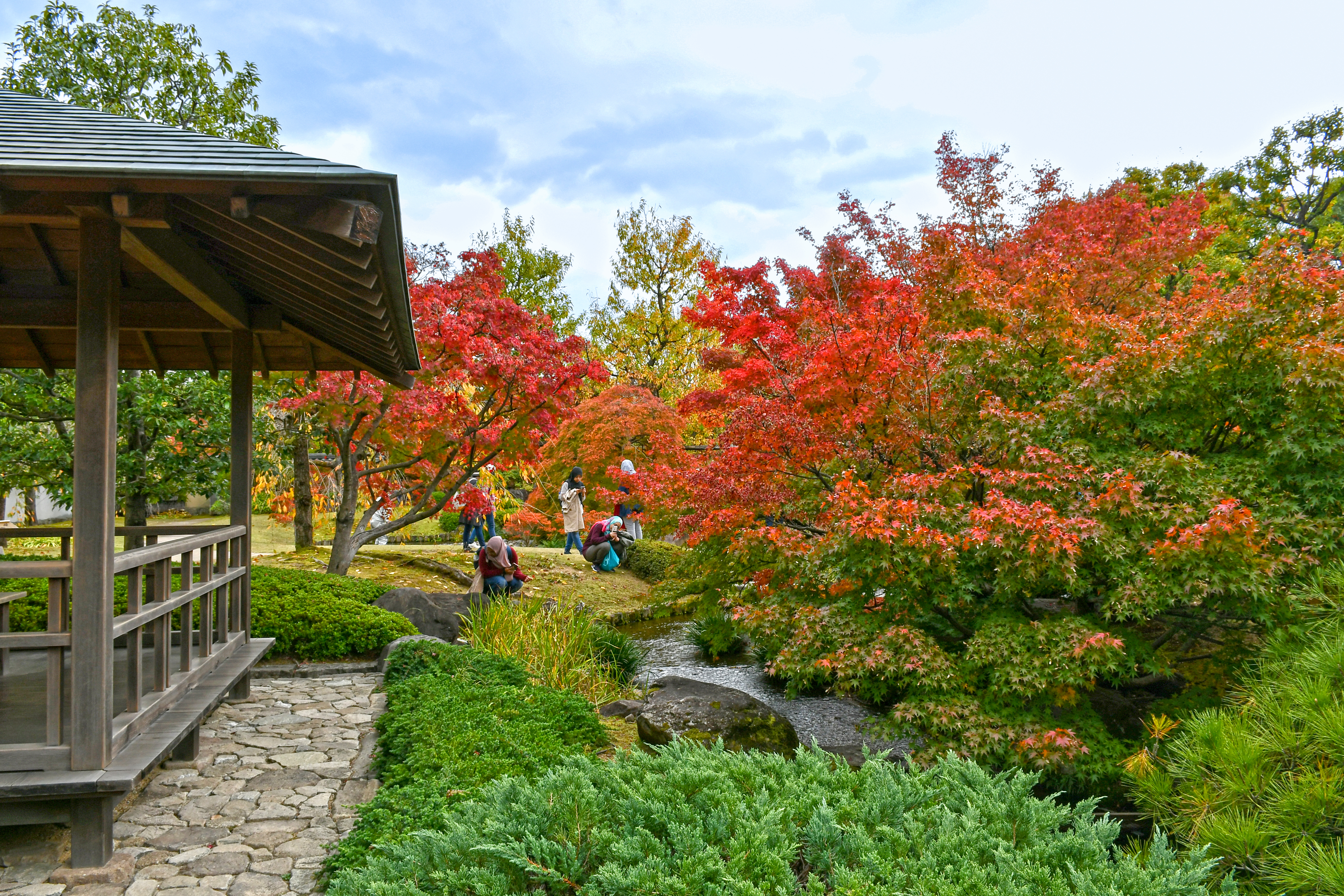
Tourists enjoying autumn foliage

Kōko-en (好古園) is a Japanese garden located next to Himeji Castle in Hyōgo Prefecture, Japan.

== History ==
It was constructed in 1992 at the site of the lord's west residence, to commemorate the 100th anniversary of the establishment of the Himeji municipality. In 2017, Kōko-en signed a sister garden agreement with Rohō-en, the Japanese Friendship Garden, in its sister city, Phoenix, Arizona.

== Layout ==
The garden is about 3.5 hectares and has nine different gardens.
