= Japanese Friendship Garden of Phoenix =

Public garden in Arizona, US

Coordinates: 33.461°N 112.076°W

Japanese Friendship Garden
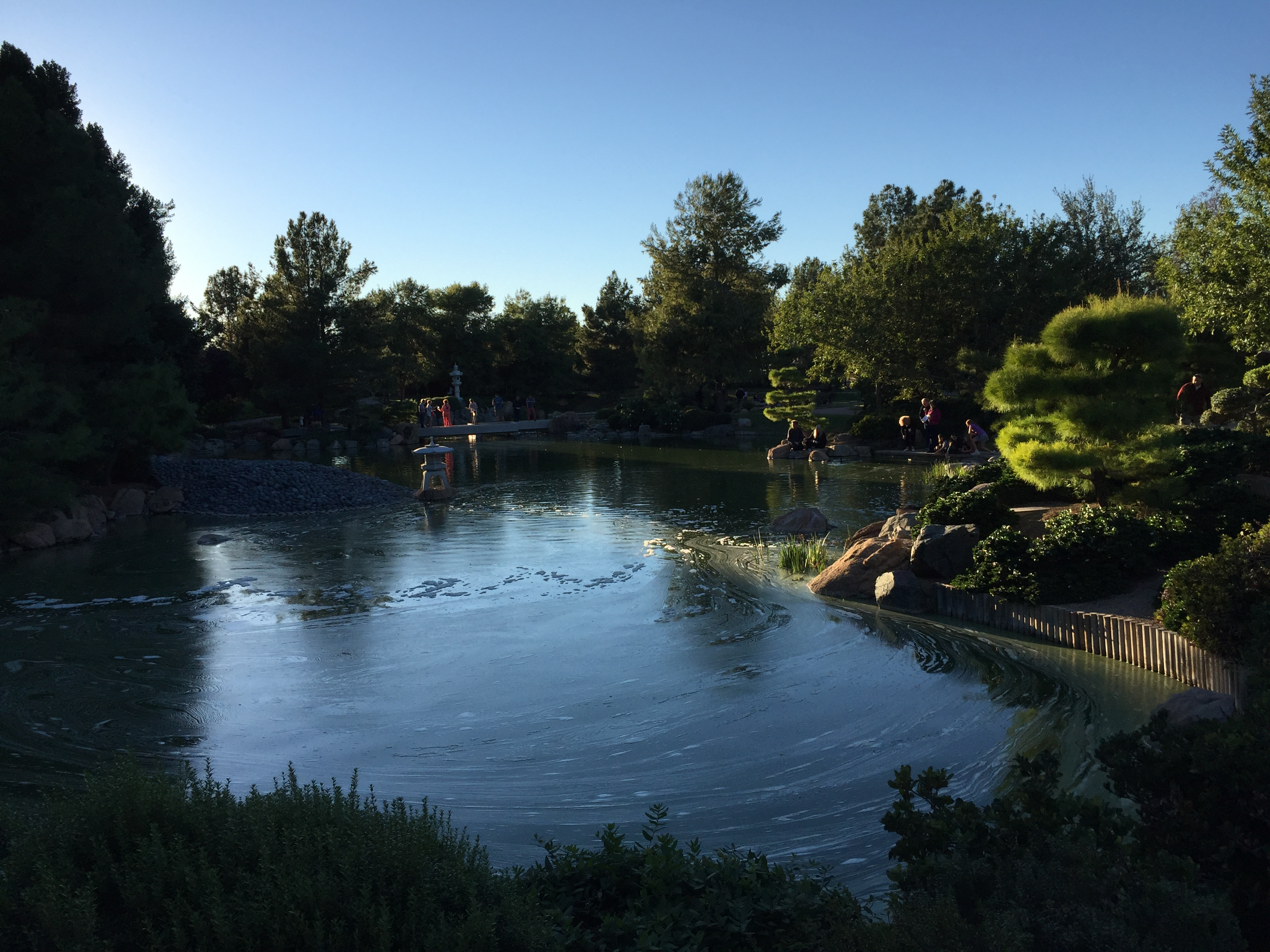
- Main pond of the Japanese Friendship Garden of Phoenix
- Interactive map of Japanese Friendship Garden
- Type: Japanese Garden
- Location: Phoenix, Arizona
- Area: 3.5 acres (1.4 ha)

The Japanese Friendship Garden is a Japanese stroll garden in Phoenix, Arizona, known as Rohō-en (鷺鳳園) in Japanese. The garden encompasses 3.5 acres (14,000 m^{2}) It is a joint project of the sister cities Phoenix and Himeji.

In 2004 it was named by the City of Phoenix as one of the Phoenix Points of Pride.

== Etymology ==
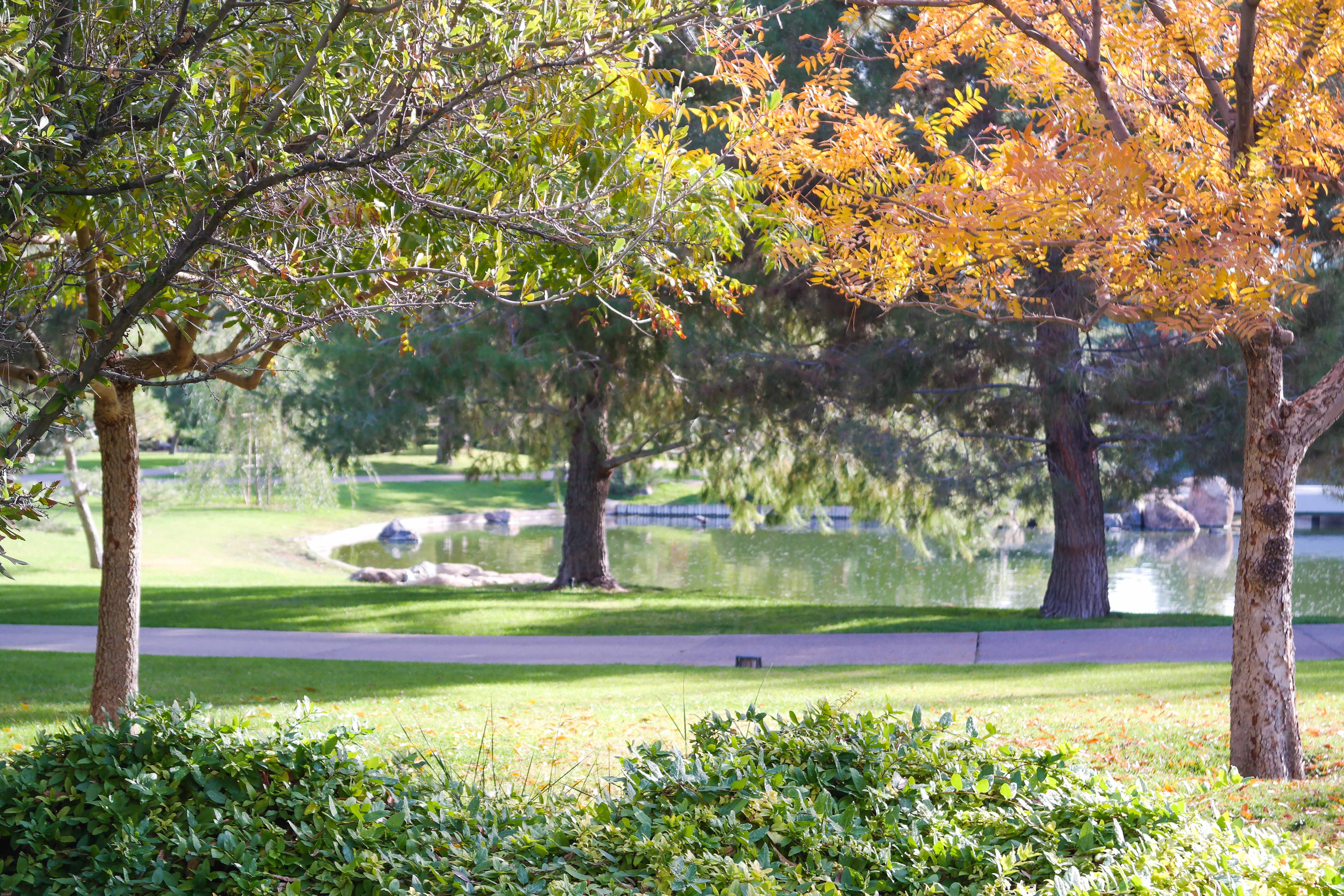
Looking at the pond, through trees

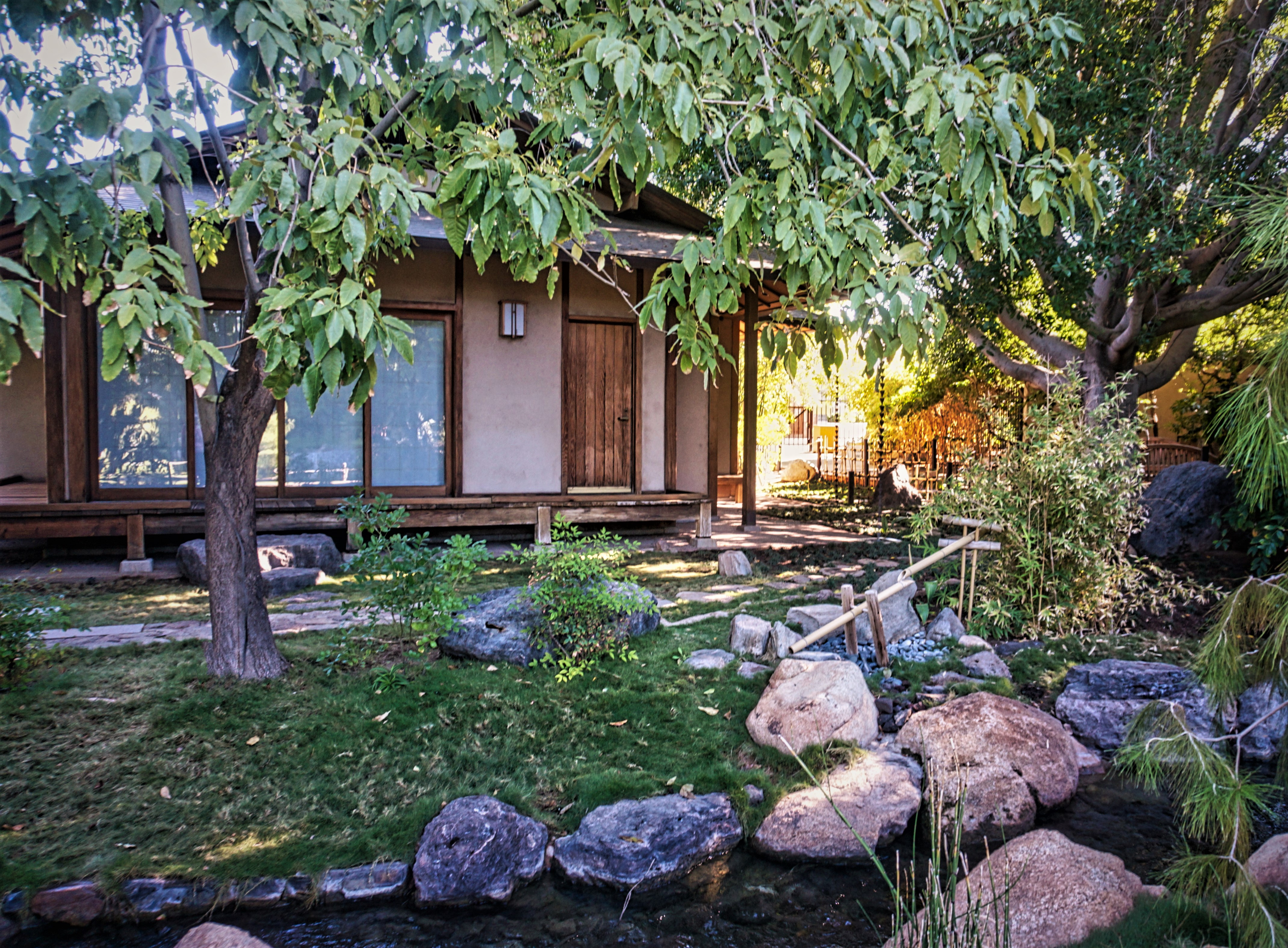
Tea House

Rohō-en (鷺鳳園) is a combination of three kanji: ro (鷺) means heron, a symbol of Himeji City. (Himeji Castle, or the White Heron Castle, is a 300-year-old medieval castle in Himeji.) Hō (鳳) refers to the mythical phoenix Fenghuang. En (園) means garden, a public garden.

== History ==
Himeji, Japan, became a Phoenix Sister City in November 1976 and is one of Phoenix's twelve Sister Cities around the globe. Phoenix and Himeji participate in business, governmental, cultural and educational exchanges that promote international goodwill and understanding. The Garden is the shared cultural vision of the cities of Phoenix and Himeji. The Japanese Friendship Garden is a 501(c)(3) non-profit organization in partnership with the City of Phoenix Parks and Recreation Department and its Sister City of Himeji, Japan.

Landscape architects from Himeji have made 60 trips to Phoenix and City of Phoenix delegations made five trips to Himeji since 1987. Overall, more than 50 architects from Himeji contributed to the project. The construction cost is estimated at $3.8 million by bond funds and $1.0 million by private donations.

The first phase of the garden opened in November 1996. The rest of it opened to the public in 2002.

== Sister Garden relationship ==
In April 2017, Rohō-en signed a sister garden affiliation with Kōko-en, in Himeji. The two gardens will actively promote each other's garden from now on.

== Features ==
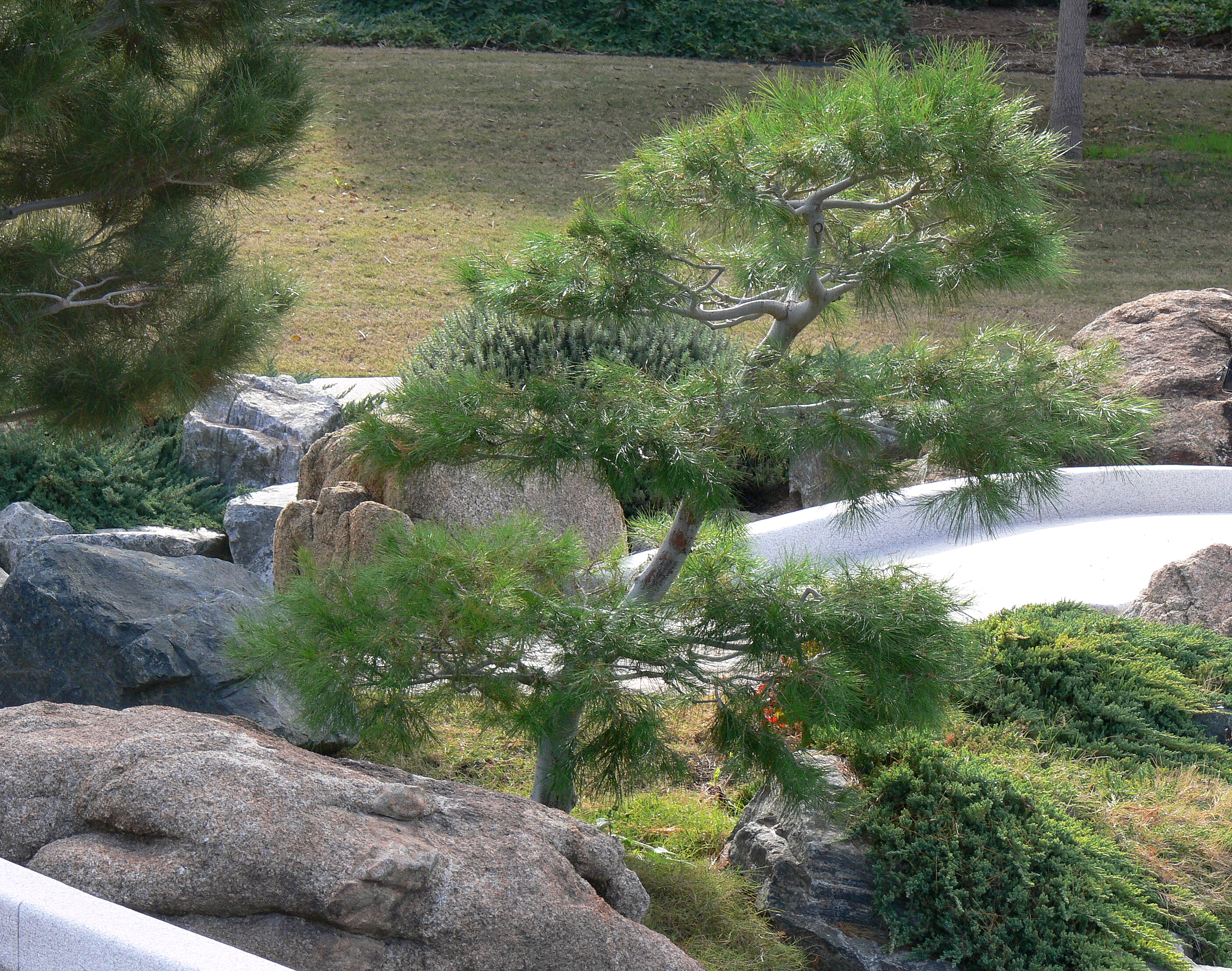
A pine tree grown on the largest island of the pond, grown in penjing style. In the background, there is a part of the north bridge, the only convex one from RO HO EN.

The garden features more than 1,500 tons of hand picked rock, stone footbridges, lanterns and more than 50 varieties of plants. It includes streams, a 12-foot waterfall, and a Koi pond with over 300 Koi fish. One of the main attractions at the Japanese Friendship Garden is the Japanese Tea House. 3.5 total acres with a koi pond that is 5/8 of an acre.

The Garden showcases more than 50 varieties of plants including two varieties of bamboo. The designers chose plant species that can withstand the rigors of a desert environment while still reflecting the serenity of a Japanese Garden. 1,500 tons of rock handpicked from quarries near Jerome, Superior, Congress and Florence line the stream beds, walking paths, lake shore and main lake waterfall.

== See also ==
- List of historic properties in Phoenix, Arizona
