= Deer Valley Petroglyph Preserve =

United States historic place in Maricopa County, Arizona

- U.S. National Register of Historic Places
- Hedgpeth Hills Petroglyph Site
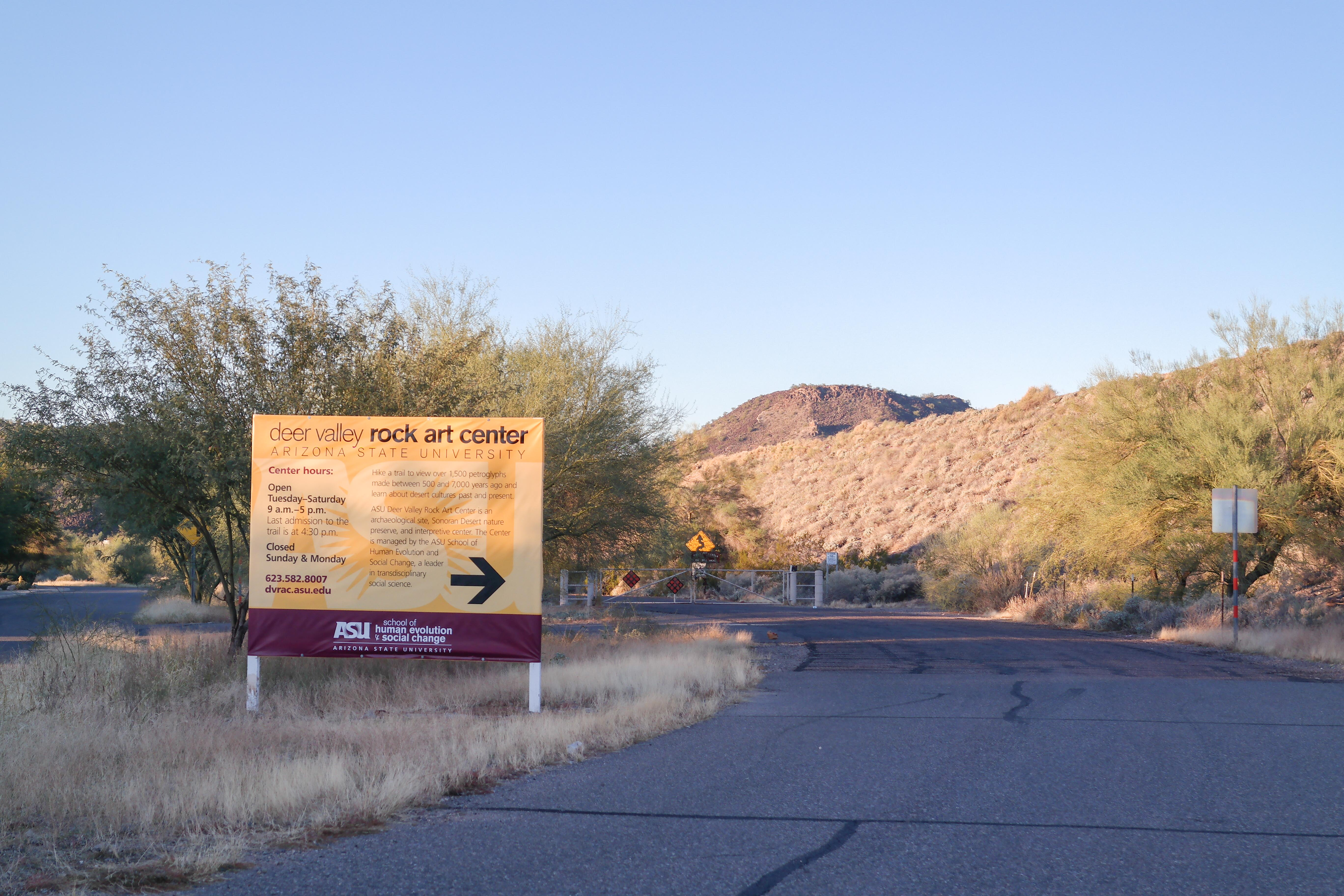
- The entrance in 2013

- Location within Arizona Location within the United States
- Location: 3711 West Deer Valley Drive; Phoenix, Arizona
- Coordinates: 33°41′01″N 112°08′30″W
- Area: 47 acres (19 ha)
- NRHP reference No.: 84000718
- Added to NRHP: February 16, 1984

The Deer Valley Petroglyph Preserve, formerly known as the Deer Valley Rock Art Center, is a 47-acre nature preserve featuring over 1500 Hohokam, Patayan, and Archaic petroglyphs visible on 500 basalt boulders in the Deer Valley area of Phoenix, Arizona. In 1980, the US Army Corps of Engineers contracted J. Simon Bruder to conduct an archaeological investigation prior to the construction of the Adobe Dam at the Hedgpeth Hills. The petroglyphs are between 500 and 5,000 years old. The site was listed on the National Register of Historic Places in 1984, and it was also listed with the Phoenix Points of Pride. The preserve and museum are operated by the ASU College of Liberal Arts and Sciences's School of Human Evolution and Social Change.

The museum was designed by Will Bruder and was constructed on the site in 1994.

== Archaeological history ==
In 1980, the US Army Corps of Engineers contracted the Museum of Northern Arizona to conduct an archaeological investigation prior to the construction of the Adobe Dam at the Hedgpeth Hills. The Museum of Northern Arizona, in a project directed by J. Simon Bruder, conducted extensive fieldwork and discovered a wide variety of features and artifacts. Their fieldwork lasted three months and an archaeological report was published. Some significant findings include: 1,571 petroglyphs on 579 boulders, ground stone and chipped stone quarries, cobble hammerstones, shells and bones, a single pithouse with 10 cooking pits and two trash deposits, a possible canal, agriculture evidence, several small stone masonry rooms, and a check dam. These findings along with excavation reports, maps, and images were originally published in the Digital Antiquity and then most recently posted in the Digital Archaeological Record. The site was listed on the National Register of Historic Places in 1984, and it was also listed with the Phoenix Points of Pride.

Bruder concluded that there were 37 different types of design elements with 143 varieties present at the site. The majority of the designs were linear with some curvilinear abstractions. These designs were photographed, drawn, and later digitally documented which allows for close examination and research that continues today.

The investigation ultimately concluded that the petroglyphs present relate to three archaeological traditions. These include the Western Archaic Tradition dating from about 5000 BC to 300 AD, the Hohokam tradition from 300 to 1450 AD, and the Patayan tradition from about 700–1550 AD. The artifacts present indicate that the site was primarily visited as people passed through the area on their way to settlements in the vicinity. People stopped here briefly to manufacture tools, perform rituals, and stay temporarily.

The preserve was created via a partnership between the federal, state, county, and city levels of government. After this establishment and the archaeological excavations, the Adobe Dam was given the clearance to be built as its purpose was to stop flooding from the Skunk Creek located nearby. Today, the dam, land, and building are all property of the Flood Control District of Maricopa County, while the actual site is operated by the School of Human Evolution and Social Change at Arizona State University.

== The petroglyphs ==
The petroglyphs are the most famous finds of the excavation and were dated to be made between 500 and 5,000 years old. Rock art, such as these petroglyphs, is considered a meaningful social practice and provides extensive evidence of life and cultural values in the past. This is the only form of visual symbolism or mediums still left today as many other materials have perished with time. Because these petroglyphs are so visible throughout the site, they continue to be frequently examined and studied. These petroglyphs were used for various religious and cultural practices primarily during the Hohokam Preclassic era c. 700–1100 AD and likely ceased during the Hohokam Classic Period, c. 1100–1450 AD.

Throughout the Phoenix Basin, many other petroglyphs sites are present, indicating a rich history of the Hohokam and strong connections with the land. The petroglyphs in the South Mountain and Phoenix area were used for ritual practices including South Mountain, Deer Valley, and Hayden Butte. The Leonard Monti Trail in the Hayden Butte Preserve near Arizona State University features a large panel of Hohokam rock that visitors can easily see today. Along with this, individuals can schedule guided tours of the petroglyphs visible at South Mountain as they are located off the traditional trail and not as visible.

== Arizona State University's presence ==
The preserve and museum are operated by Arizona State University's School of Human Evolution and Social Change. Since 1994, the university has taken extensive measures to preserve the site as well as protect and operate it on a daily basis. They provide the public with numerous ways to explore and learn about the site. They offer education about the indigenous cultures associated with the site through a variety of mediums including publications, guided tours, and lectures.

=== Community engagement ===
Since Arizona State University has taken control in 1994, they have made the site a community focus in six main areas:

1. Canyon Records: Canyon Records is a Phoenix, Arizona-based music store that has produced and distributed Native American music since 1994. Their partnership with the university began in 2017 with the goal to provide educational materials for the site. Canyon Records promotes Native American cultural and heritage and the site. They provide and continue to update many forms of expression including art, music, and writing sources
2. Act One: Act One is an Arizona-based organization that provides meaningful experiences to Title 1 schools that have funds for both educational culture and arts field trips and free museum admission with the Culture Pass program. The preserve participates in both of these programs and also offers specific days each month for Title 1 school field trips.
3. Archaeology Southwest: Archaeology Southwest is one of the most popular organizations that explores the past through a holistic, conservation-based approach, something that Arizona State University and the organization strive for. The organization's magazine is sold at the preserve and lectures are held by members of their team on topics of archaeology and research methods. The organization is also consulted by ASU when local research needs to be conducted.
4. Arizona Master Naturalist: The Arizona Master Naturalist Association (AZMN) provides natural resource volunteers who are skilled and knowledgeable about sites across the state. They provide the preserve with these skilled volunteers who provide education, stewardship, and information to the daily visitors. This furthers the preserve and the university's mission of education.
5. Osher Lifelong Learning Institute: The Osher Lifelong Learning Institute is based out of Arizona State University and gives university-quality, non-credit classes for students 50 and up. Themed lecture classes are offered at the preserve and are specialized in a variety of cross-disciplinary studies including anthropology, global health, archaeology, and life sciences. These courses are led by graduate students and faculty during the fall semesters.
6. Girl Scouts of the USA: The preserve is an official partner with the Arizona Cactus-Pine Council. They work with the organization to provide badge and patch workshops that focus on topics of archaeology, preservation, and desert wildlife. The main goal is to provide valuable, engaging, and unique learning experiences for girls in the Phoenix area.

== Exhibits ==
Arizona State University and the School of Human Evolution & Social Change (SHESC) have worked together to provide numerous exhibits at the site that further enhance the educational mission of the site. The permanent exhibit, Leaving Marks: The Rock Art and Archaeology of Deer Valley, seeks to provide a detailed history of the site and the significance it has to the surrounding areas. This exhibit was made possible due to a grant from the Arizona Humanities Council. Some other exhibits that have been at the preserve include Legacy of Landscapes: The Art and Archaeology of Perry Mesa; One World, Many Voices: The Artistry of Canyon Records; Fragments: Piecing Together Southwest Archaeology; and Pieces of the Puzzle: New Perspectives on the Hohokam.

== Deer Valley Petroglyph Preserve ==
The Deer Valley Petroglyph Preserve museum building was designed by architect Will Bruder and landscape architect Christy Ten Eyck and was constructed in 1994. The museum was designed to represent unique architectural solutions combining design elements of steel and concrete. It is shaped like a boomerang as it is meant to symbolize connecting the city of Phoenix to the sanctuary of the preserve. It has space for ongoing exhibits, teaching, research, and presentation. Serving as a focal point at the preserve, thousands of visitors pass through it each year. It also attracts those interested in architectural design and landscape architecture from across the globe.

== Gallery ==
Hohokam petroglyphs and other items at the Deer Valley Petroglyph Preserve

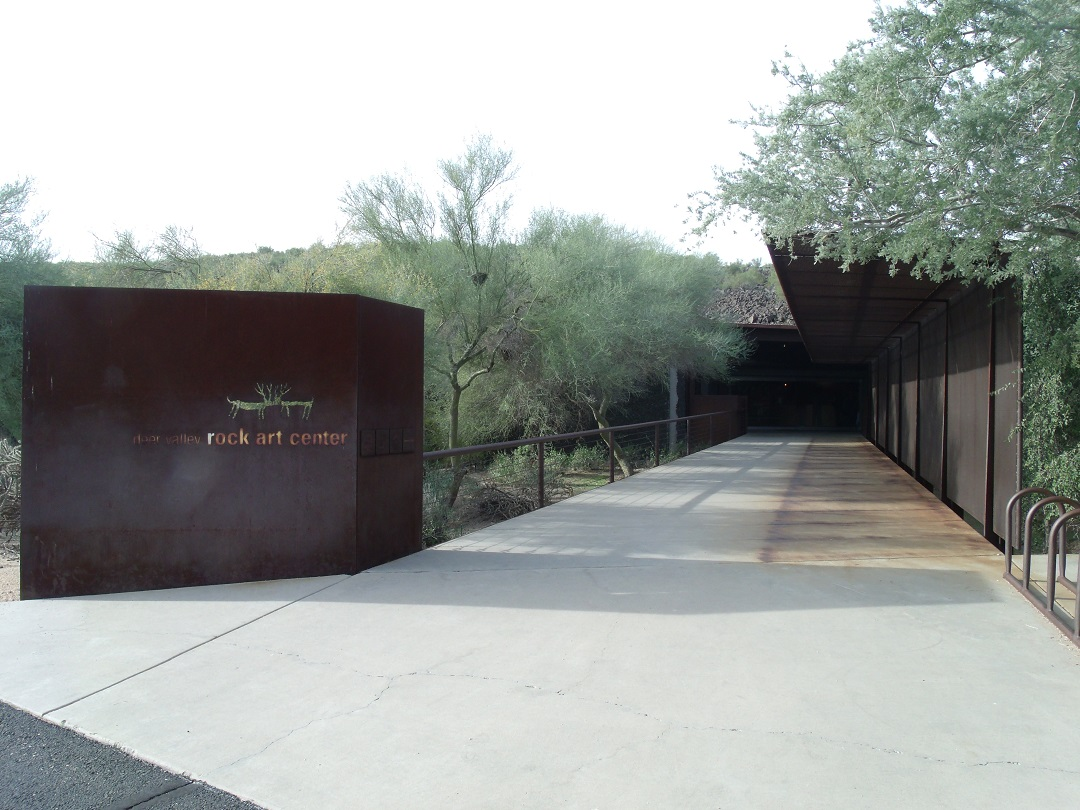
Entrance

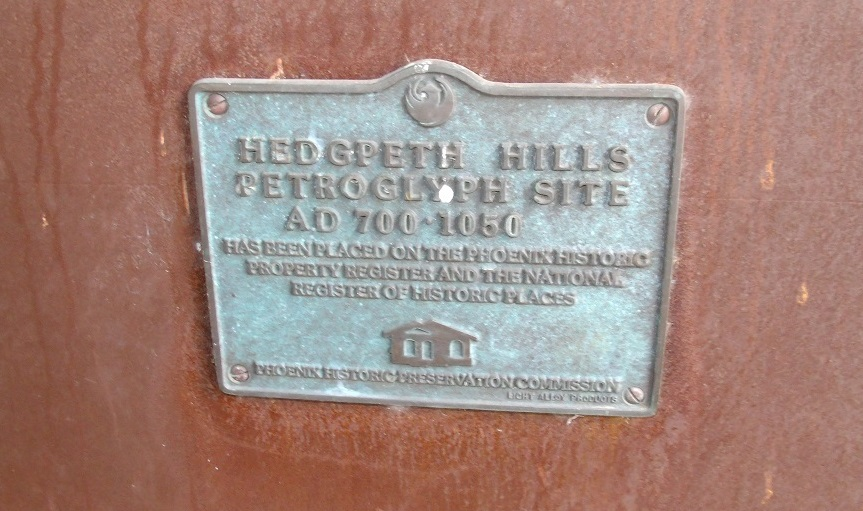
National Register of Historic Places Marker

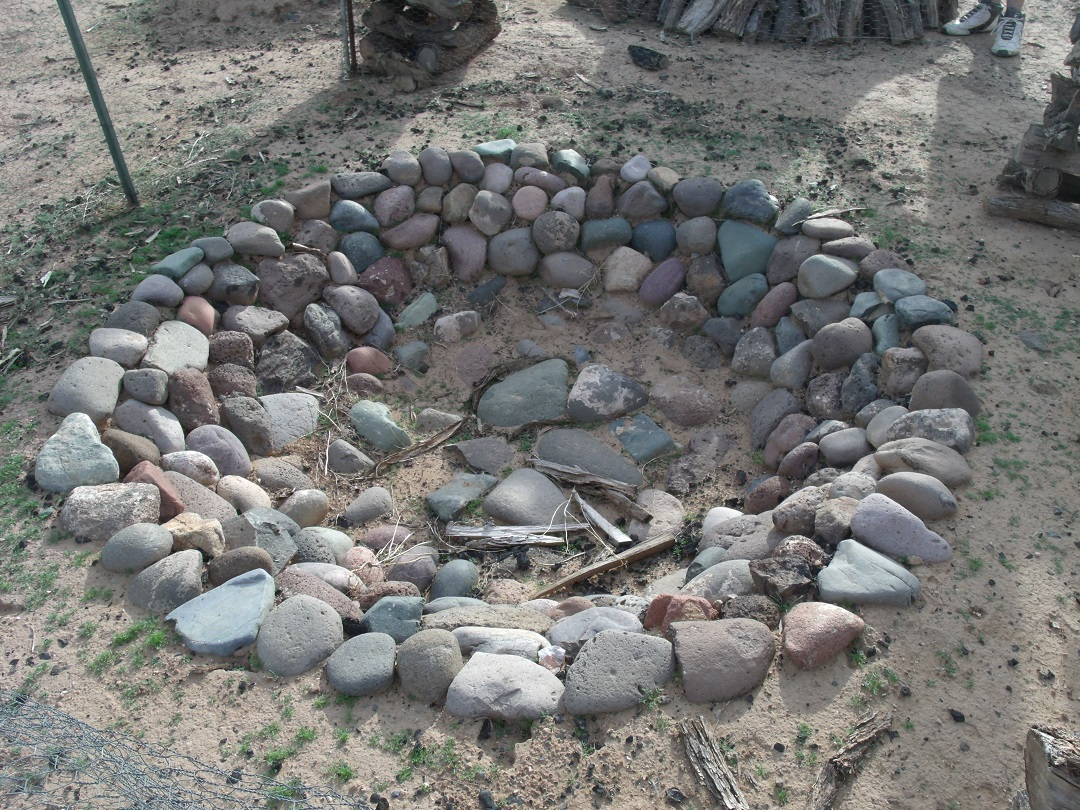
A prehistoric Hohokam cooking pit

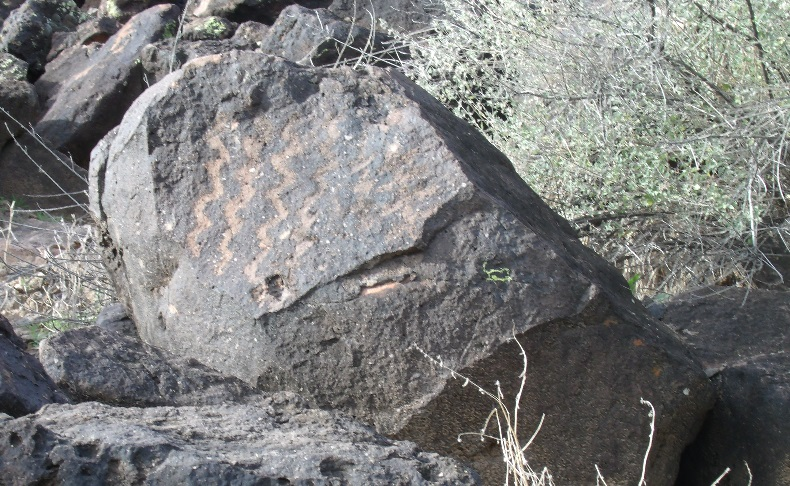
A petroglyph

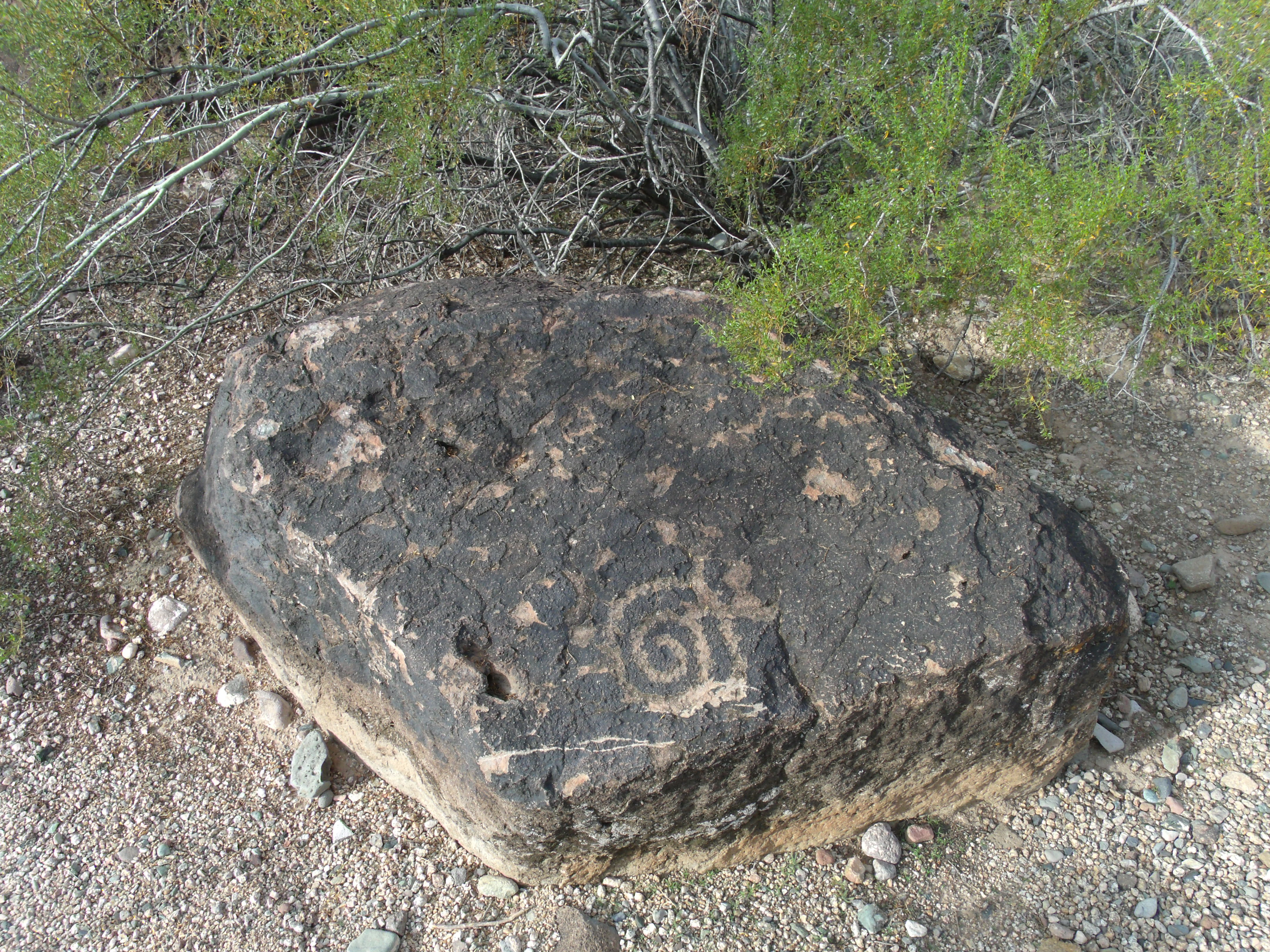
A petroglyph with a spiral carved into it

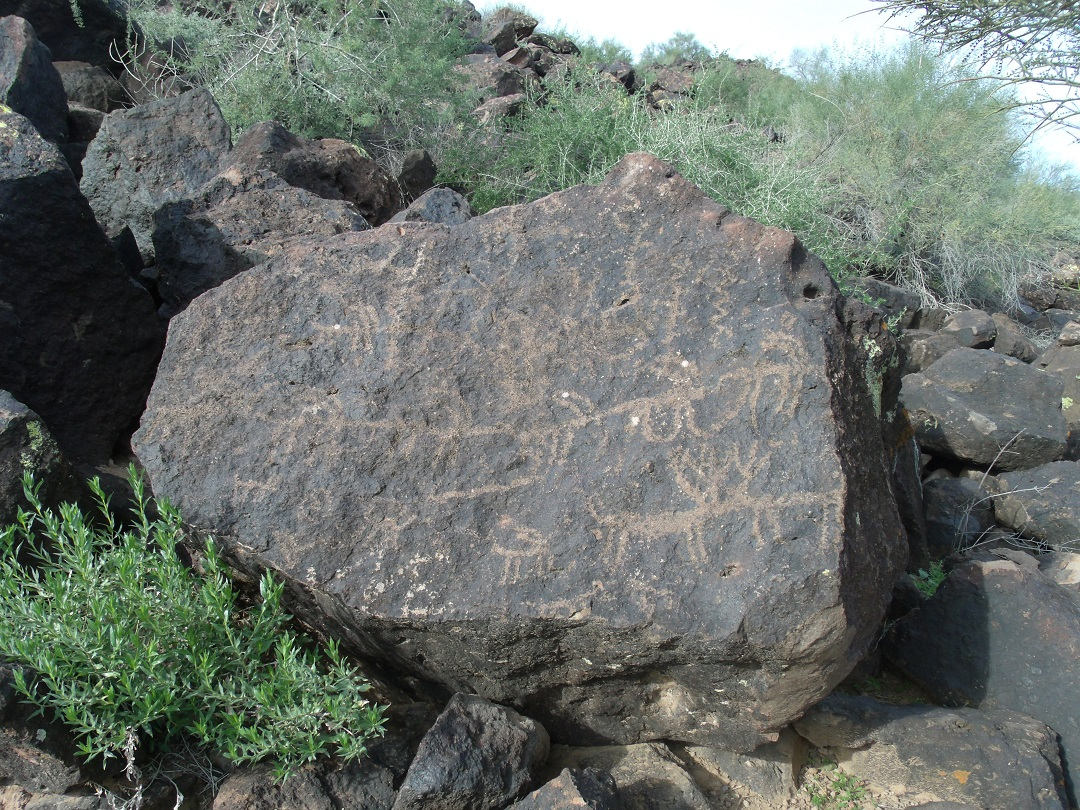
A petroglyph "scene" with two deer bumping heads (bottom right)

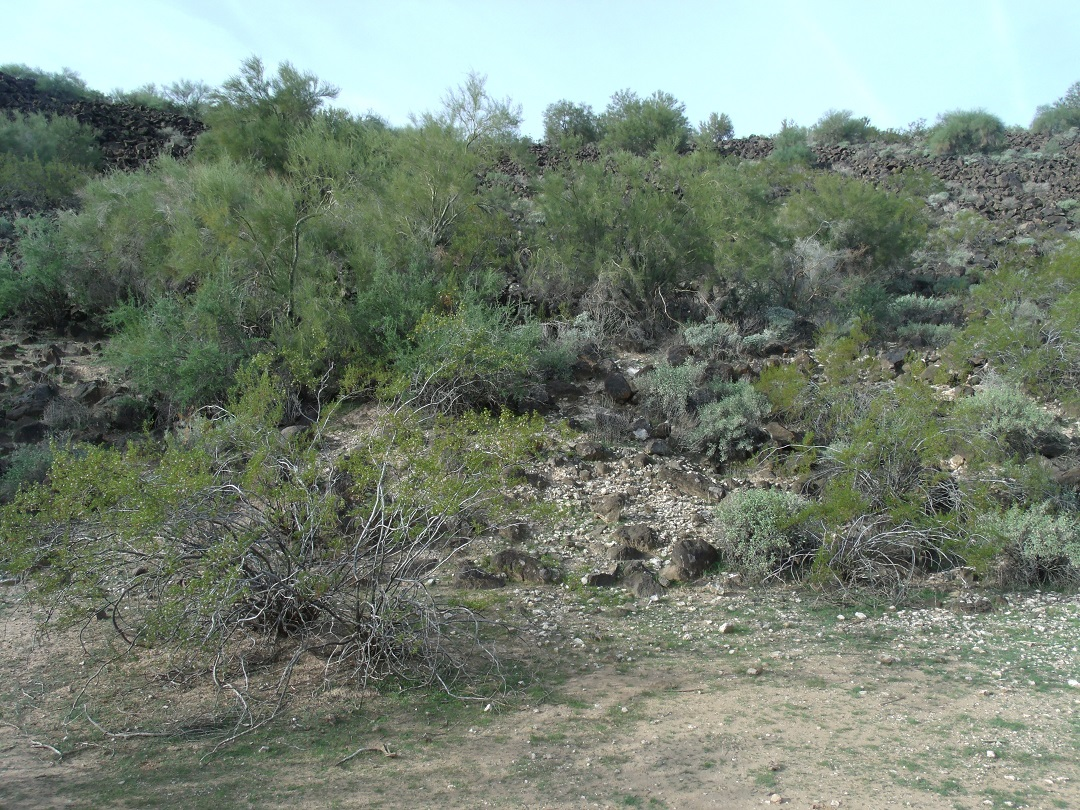
The Hedgpeth Hills and Sonoran Desert viewed from the center

== See also ==
- Phoenix Historic Property Register
