= Burton Barr Central Library =

Library in Phoenix, Arizona

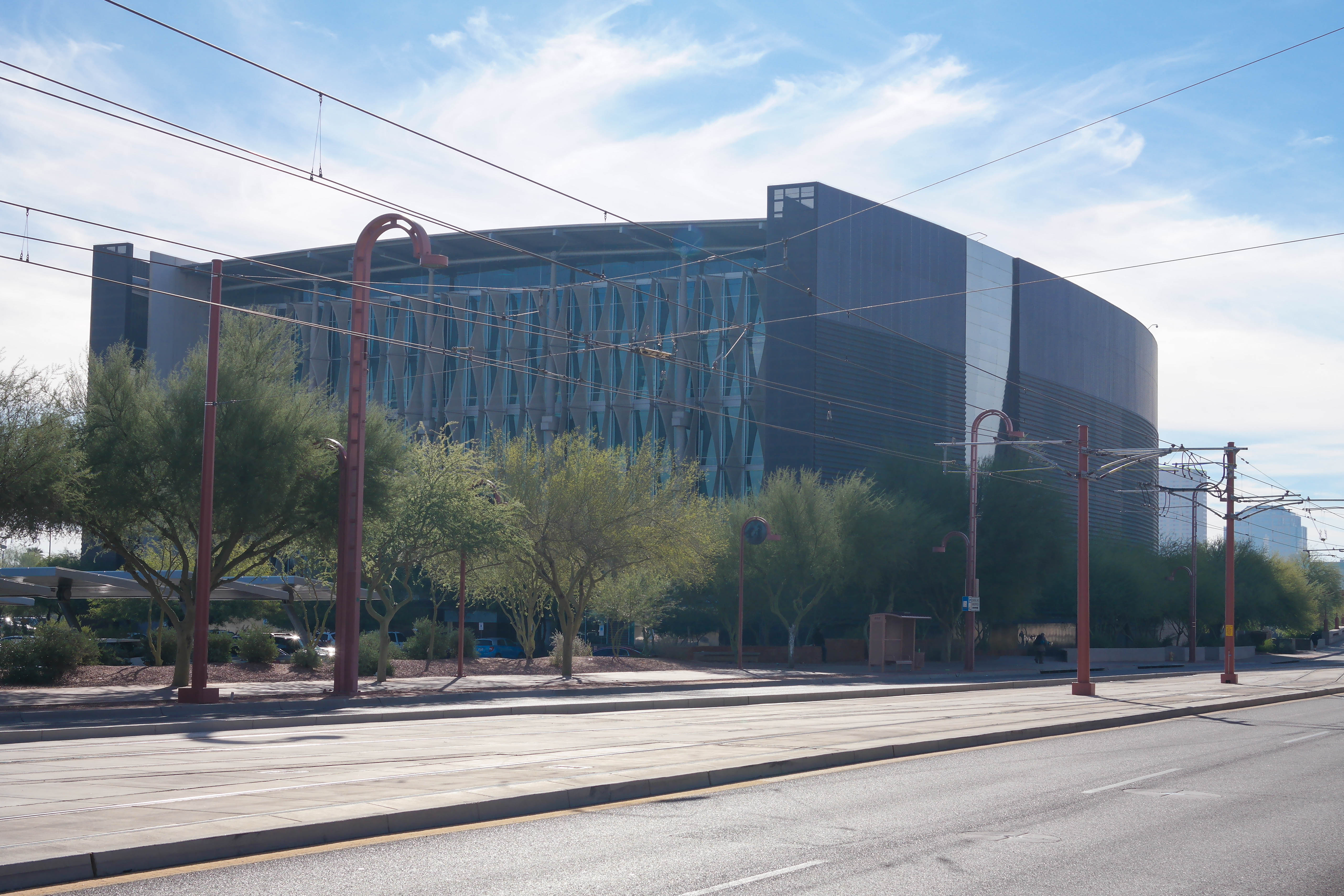
- Interactive map of the Burton Barr Central Library area

General information
- Type: Public library
- Location: 1221 North Central Avenue; Phoenix, Arizona 85004; United States
- Coordinates: 33°27′45″N 112°04′24″W
- Construction started: 1989
- Opened: 1995
- Owner: Phoenix Public Library

Technical details
- Floor count: 5
- Floor area: 26,000 m^{2} (280,000 sq ft)

Design and construction
- Architecture firm: bruderDWLarchitects

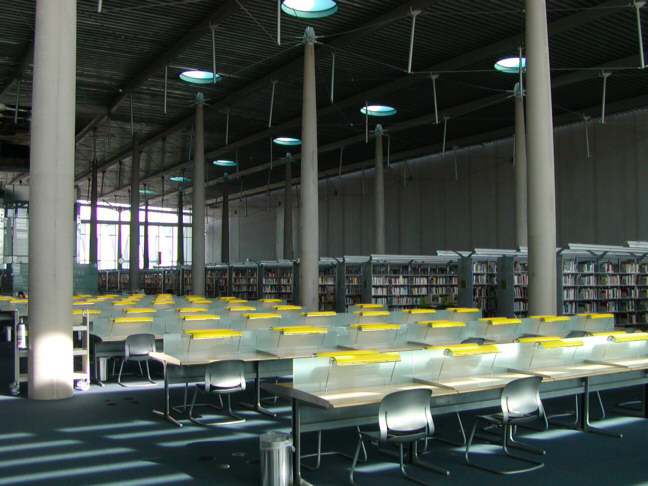
The great reading room on the fifth floor of Burton Barr Central Library, Phoenix

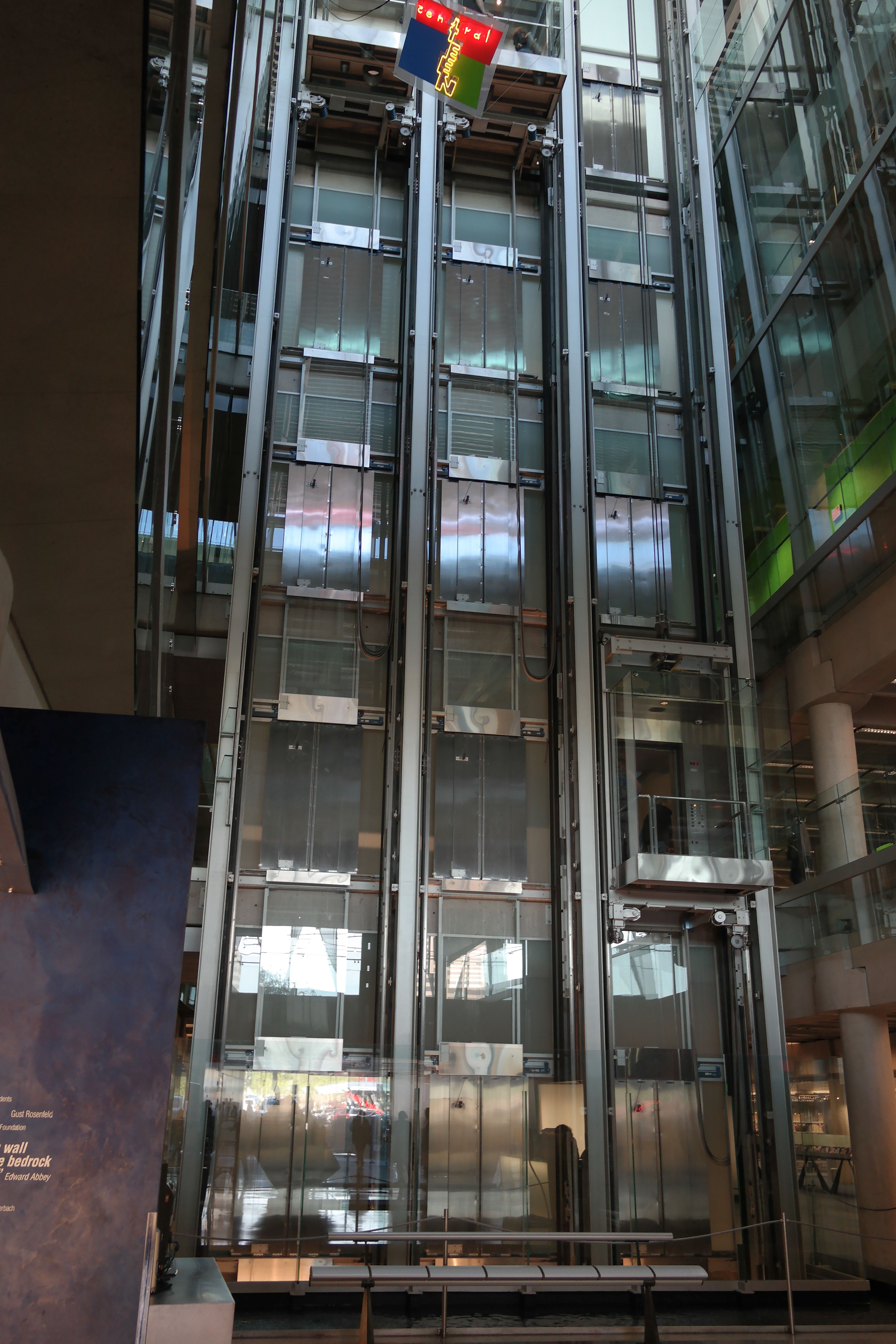
Vertical circulation core containing three high-speed elevators

The Burton Barr Central Library is the central library of Phoenix, Arizona. It is the flagship location and administrative headquarters for the Phoenix Public Library. It was named in honor of Burton Barr, the Republican Majority Leader in the Arizona House of Representatives from 1966 to 1986. The library houses a collection of 1 million volumes.

== History ==
The building was funded by a 1988 bond issue and replaced a nearby 1950s-era facility on McDowell Road that is now part of the Phoenix Art Museum.

=== Design ===
The design for the Burton Barr Central Library was a collaboration between DWL Architects and Will Bruder. The five-story building opened in May 1995 and is 280,000 square feet (26,000 m^{2}). Vertical circulation through the building is facilitated by a central open core containing three high-speed elevators and a five-level grand staircase known as the "crystal canyon." The building incorporates a roof structure inspired by Buckminster Fuller's tensegrity structures and features shade sails on the north facade and motorized louvers on the south facade for improved sun control. An open, 1-acre (0.40 ha) reading room comprises the fifth floor. A summer solstice celebration is held there annually, where the lighting effects are best observed. At solar noon, some of the roof skylights project circles of sunlight directly down the north-south midline axis of the library, with some reaching the ground floor lobby. Sunlight simultaneously washes the upper eastern and western walls of the fifth level.

=== Incidents ===
On July 15, 2017, the library sustained water damage from a broken sprinkler system, caused by a storm passing through the city. About 6000 books were damaged. The library reopened on June 16, 2018.

== Library facilities ==
=== Great Reading Room ===
The great reading room on the fifth floor is 1 acre in area, one of the largest in the US. It houses many study areas and the nonfiction collection.

=== StartUpPHX ===
StartUpPHX is located on the second floor of the library and is a discovery space for business entrepreneurs. It is open to the public and offers free services.

=== Arizona Room ===
The Arizona Room is located on the second floor and houses a research collection focused on Southwestern heritage, lifestyle, and geography from prehistoric times to the present.

=== College Depot at Phoenix Public Library ===
College Depot at Phoenix Public Library is a free, full-service college planning center. It provides a team of advisors and offers workshops and one-on-one appointments regarding admissions, financial aid, and scholarships.

=== Teen Central ===
Teen Central is a 5,000 square-foot area located on the fourth floor. It is reserved for teens between the ages of 12 and 18. The area offers workshops, computers and study areas, as well as a "living room" with a drop-down screen where movies are shown. In addition to the collection of books, CDs, and DVDs, there is also an art gallery.

=== Children's Place ===
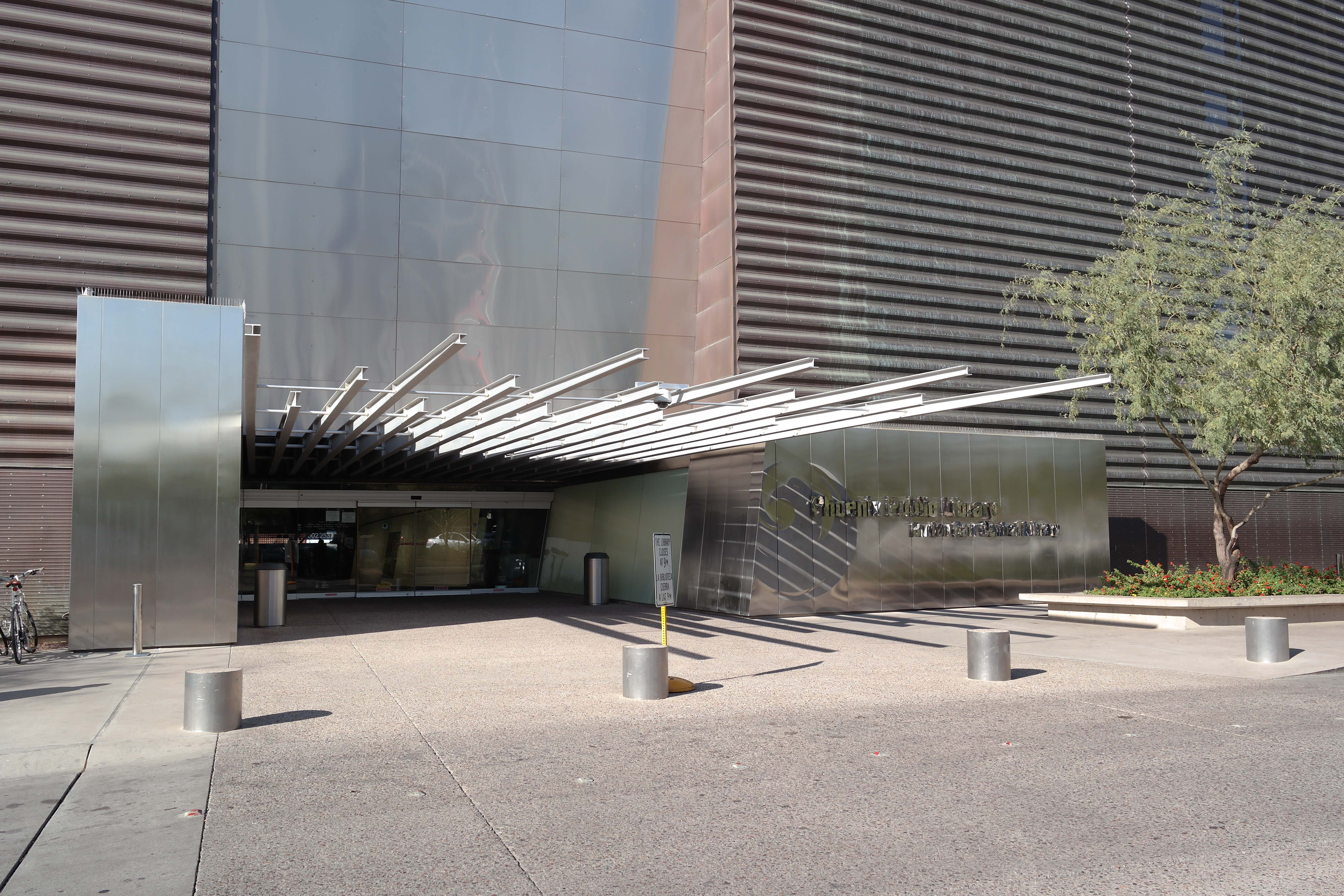
Library east entrance

Children's Place is a 10,000 square-foot space located on the first floor. It contains a story room, auditorium, and outdoor children's garden. An addition and renovation by Will Bruder Architects, which will nearly double the area of the space, is currently in the works.

=== MACH1 ===
MACH1 is a maker-space located on the fourth floor. It offers free STEAM programs for children, teens, and their families. STEAM programs strengthen skills such as coding, 3D modeling, 3D printing, sewing, music/photo/video editing, and more.

=== Rare Book Room ===
Located on the fourth floor, the Rare Book Room offers a collection of 3,400 items and free tours.

=== Central Gallery ===
Central Gallery is a fine art exhibition gallery located on the first floor. It features work by Arizona artists who are not currently represented by a gallery.

== Recognition ==
Burton Barr Central Library has won several local, national, and international awards, including:

- 2021 Twenty-five Year Award, American Institute of Architects (AIA)
- 1995 Honor Award, AIA Arizona
- 1997 Award of Excellence, AIA/American Library Association
- 1995 Honor Award, AIA Western Mountain Region
- 1995 Excellence in Concrete Award, American Concrete Institute Arizona Chapter
- 1995 Best New Building, Phoenix New Times

The library was chosen as one of the Phoenix Points of Pride in 2008. In 2010, the library received a LEED Existing Buildings Silver 2.0 designation. It was awarded in the "existing buildings" category, rather than new construction, as LEED was not created until 1998, three years after the facility was opened.

== See also ==
- List of historic properties in Phoenix, Arizona
