= Phoenix Public Library =

Municipal library system serving Phoenix, Arizona

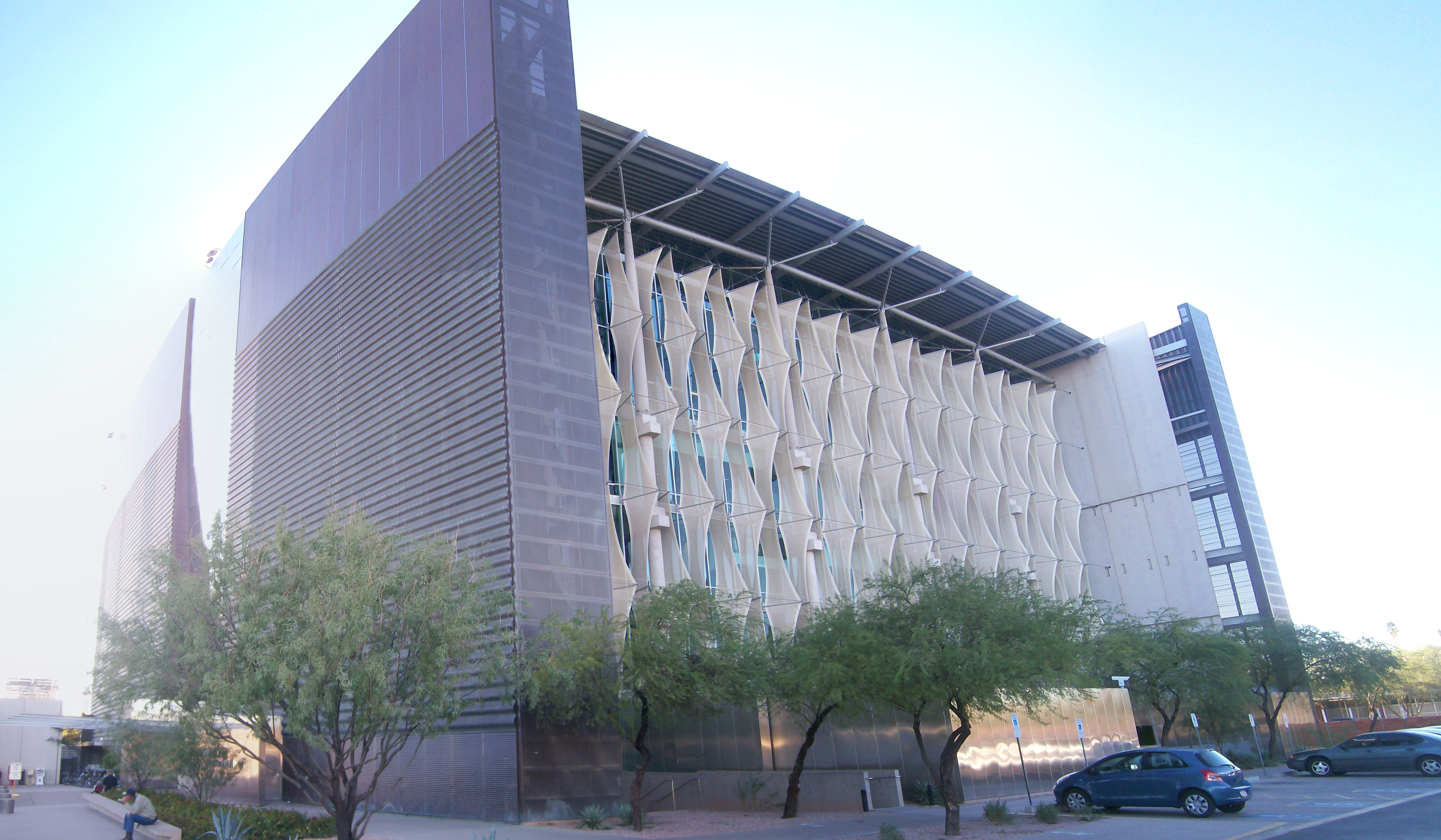
- Burton Barr Central Library
- 34°33′27.84″N 111°59′44.5″W
- Location: 1221 N. Central Ave. Phoenix, Arizona, USA
- Type: Public library
- Established: June 21, 1898
- Architect: Will Bruder
- Branches: 16

Access and use
- Circulation: 9,364,763 (FY 2022)

Other information
- Website: www.phoenixpubliclibrary.org

The Phoenix Public Library is a municipal library system serving Phoenix, Arizona, and operated by the city of Phoenix. There are 17 branches currently in operation citywide, anchored by the flagship Burton Barr Central Library on the northern edge of downtown Phoenix. Four of the 17 locations were designed by prominent local architect Will Bruder: the Burton Barr central library (opened May 1995), the Cholla branch location at Metrocenter Mall (opened 1977, enlarged and remodeled in 1990), the Mesquite branch at Paradise Valley Mall (opened November 1982, expanded May 1998), and the Agave branch in far northwest Phoenix (opened June 2009). Many of its branches are named for endemic desert plants.

== Background ==
The library traces its origins to 1897 when a group of citizens decided to raise funds for a library. This group, the Friday Club, consisting of women of upper socioeconomic standing with the same interests of advancement, sought to establish and organize the first public library in Phoenix. By opening day, the library consisted of 1,500 titles. In 1904, industrialist Andrew Carnegie donated money for a library building on Washington Street near the state capital; this building is still in operation as a museum, archives and research center operated by the state of Arizona.

With the explosive growth of Phoenix after World War II, new branches were added citywide. A Central Library was opened in 1953 (replacing the Carnegie Library as Phoenix's main library location), but replaced by the aforementioned Burton Barr Central Library in 1995 (its building is now part of the Phoenix Art Museum).

== Services ==
Patrons can borrow 35 physical items at a time. The Phoenix Public Library system offers books, DVDs, CDs, audiobooks, video games, devices, blood pressure kits, culture passes, and seed packets to be checked out. Digital checkouts are also available through Libby, Hoopla, Kanopy, Freegal, Press Reader, and Flipster.

Phoenix Public Library also offers free computer access and free public wireless internet. Public printing from a personal device or the library computers is available in black and white for $0.20 per page ($0.10 per page at South Mountain Community Library) and in color for $0.40 per page ($0.50 per page at South Mountain Community Library). Wireless internet hotspots are available to borrow with a valid Phoenix Public Library Card and a current government issued photo ID with a current address.

Food resources are also available through the library. Four different assistant programs are offered to help families and residents of Phoenix, Arizona with food insecurity. Citizen practice tests, materials in multiple languages, and English as a Second Language (ESL) materials are all offered through the Phoenix Public Library. As well as, different programs for families, teens, adults, and more each month.

== Libraries ==
- The Burton Barr Central Library opened in May 1995 and is 280,000 square feet (26,000 m^{2}) on five levels. The library is in Phoenix's City Council District 7. Located at 1221 N. Central Ave, 85004.
- The Acacia Library opened in January 1969 and is 6,600 square feet (610 m^{2}). It replaced the earlier Desert Mission Library which opened in 1929, and was housed in a 2,400 square feet (220 m^{2}) building on 330 E. Eva Street. Acacia library is in District 3. Located at 750 E. Townley, 85020.
- The Agave Library opened in June 2009 and is 25,000 square feet (2,300 m^{2}). The library is in District 1. Located at 23550 N. 36th Ave, 85310.
- The Century Library opened in December 1973 and is 6,500 square feet (600 m^{2}). The library is in District 6. Located at 1750 E. Highland Ave, 85016.
- The Cholla Library opened in 1977 and was expanded and remodeled in 1990. The library is 30,000 square feet (2,800 m^{2}) on two levels. The library is located near Metrocenter Mall in District 1, like Agave. 10050 Metro Parkway E., 85051.
- The Desert Broom Library opened in February 2005 and has won numerous awards for its design, including the 2006 ALA/IIDA Award for Innovation in Sustainable Design. The library is 15,000 square feet (1,400 m^{2}) and is in District 2. Located at 29710 N. Cave Creek Rd, 85331.
- The Desert Sage Library opened in July 1997 and is 13,400 square feet (1,240 m^{2}). Like Central and Cesar Chavez, Desert Sage is in District 7. Located at 7602 W. Encanto Blvd, 85035.
- The Harmon Library opened in December 1950 and was replaced with a new structure in August 2009 and is 12,400 square feet (1,150 m^{2}). Harmon is in District 8. Located at 1325 S. 5th Ave, 85003.
- The Ironwood Library opened in October 1991 and is 16,300 square feet (1,510 m^{2}). Ironwood is in District 6, like Century Library. Located at 4333 E. Chandler Blvd, 85048.
- The Juniper Library, 14,435 square feet (1,341.1 m^{2}), opened in July 1996. Juniper is in District 3. Located at 1825 W. Union Hills Dr, 85027.
- The Mesquite Library, 19,875 square feet (1,846.4 m^{2}), opened in November 1982 and was expanded in May 1998. Mesquite is near the former site of the Paradise Valley Mall in District 3, like Juniper. Located at 4525 E. Paradise Village, 85032.
- The Ocotillo Library opened in 1967 and was remodeled in 2012. Ocotillo is 6,600 square feet (610 m^{2}) and is located in District 7, like several others, including Cesar Chavez. Located at 102 W. Southern Ave, 85041.
- The Palo Verde Library originally opened in 1966, reopened in January 2006 in Maryvale Village. Palo Verde is 16,000 square feet (1,500 m^{2}) and is located in District 5. 4402 N. 51st Ave, 85031.
- The Prickly Pear Library opened in January 2007 and is 25,000 square feet (2,300 m^{2}). Like the Central Library, Prickly Pear is located in District 7. It was originally known as Cesar Chavez Library, but was renamed in 2026 following sexual abuse allegations against Chavez. Located at 3635 W. Baseline Rd, 85339.
- The Saguaro Library opened in September 1964. Saguaro is 10,500 square feet (980 m^{2}) and is in District 8, similarly to Harmon. Located at 2808 N. 46th St, 85008.
- South Mountain Community Library opened in September 2011 as a partnership between Phoenix and South Mountain Community College (SMCC). SMCL is 50,000 square feet (4,600 m^{2}). Located at 7050 S. 24th St, 85042.
- The Yucca Library opened in March 1969 and was remodeled in 2001. 10,000 square feet (930 m^{2}) in size, Yucca is located in District 5, like Palo Verde. Located at 5648 N. 15th Ave, 85015.
