= Ben Avery Shooting Facility =

Shooting range in Phoenix, Arizona, USA

Coordinates: 33.8042°N 112.1486°W

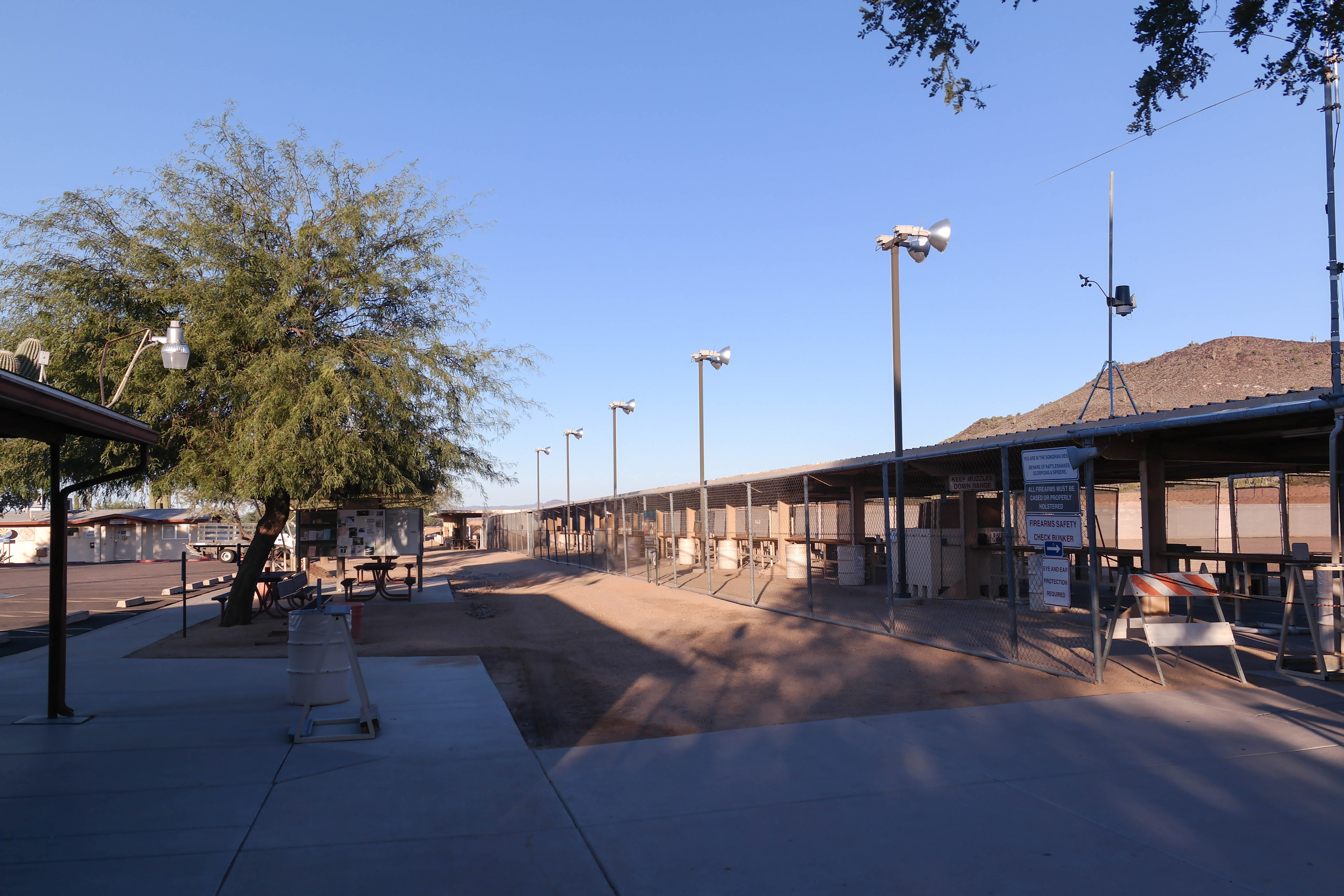
One of the public firing lines at Ben Avery

The Ben Avery Shooting Facility is a public outdoor shooting range located in northern Phoenix, Arizona. At 1650 acres (668 hectares) it is the largest public operated shooting facility in the United States. It is operated by the Arizona Game and Fish Department (AZGFD) and is identified as one of the Phoenix Points of Pride. The facility is named for Ben Avery, a local outdoors activist.

== History ==
The Ben Avery Shooting Facility began as an effort on the parts of Ben Avery, Glenn C. Taylor and Jim Beaman, prominent outdoors activists in Arizona in the 1950s, to provide a public shooting facility in the interest of safety. In a letter to the Maricopa County government, Avery summed up the trio's concerns that the desert around the city had become a "battleground" with recreational shooters and it was a concern for public safety. Upon selection of the current site, Avery helped finance the initial construction with a $5,000 personal loan and $3,000 in local contributions. Construction began in late 1959, and the facility was completed and operations transferred to Maricopa County in 1960.

In 1961, Mr. Avery appointed the Arizona State Rifle and Pistol Association, (State Arm of the NRA since 1909) to help run the financial aspects of the range. This partnership ended in 2009 although the ASRPA still is active in supporting the range, competition, and the State Game and Fish Department in its efforts to grow competition, firearm safety, and hunter education.

Originally named the Black Canyon Shooting Range, the facility underwent further expansions with the cooperation of the AZGFD. With the assistance of the National Rifle Association the facility was selected as the 1970 host of the ISSF World Shooting Championships, bringing worldwide recognition to the region as well as the facility. Preparations for the competition required further development and expansion of the facilities, which saw additional involvement and support from the AZGFD. Phoenix became only the second US city to host the international competition, and was the third and thus far last time it has been hosted in the US.

In 1992 the facility was renamed to the Ben Avery Range. In 1995, the Maricopa County Board of Supervisors decided that it would not renew its obligation to operate the facility. AZGFD took over operation of the range and in 1996 it was given its current name, the Ben Avery Shooting Facility.

== Facilities and events ==
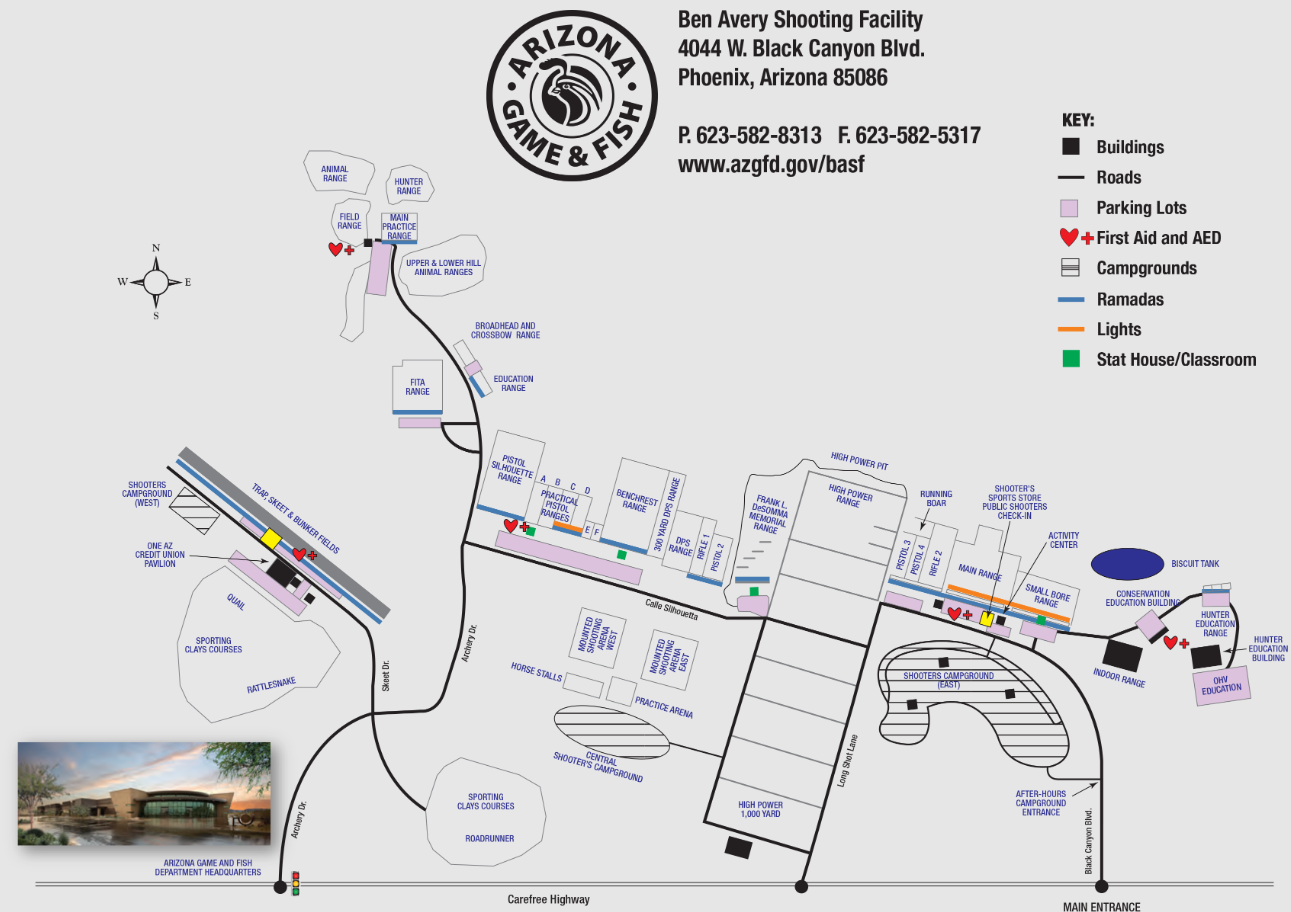
Map of facilities, as of 2021

From its beginnings as primarily a rifle range, the range has expanded to include a number of facilities catering to various outdoors activities. These facilities include:

- 67 point main covered range, and specialty ranges
- 5 field archery ranges
- An International Archery Federation range
- 99 site campground
- The Clay Target Center

The range also hosts a number of gun safety education courses run by the NRA, ASRPA, and hunter safety education courses run by the AZGFD. A number of other specialty courses as well as competitive events are held at the range during the year.

== Clay Target Center ==
The Clay Target Center is a specialty facility located within the overall Ben Avery complex, catering to clay target shooting. Originally constructed as a part of the Black Canyon Shooting Range in 1964, the facilities were leased by a private company in 1996 and heavily remodeled. In 2006 operations of the facility were turned over to the AZGFD and underwent another round of renovations, expected to be completed by spring 2007.

The center hosts the all traditional clay target shooting games, including skeet and trap shooting as well as newer games including sporting clays. A number of competitions are held in the facility, and special youth shooter programs are available.

== See also ==
- List of historic properties in Phoenix, Arizona
