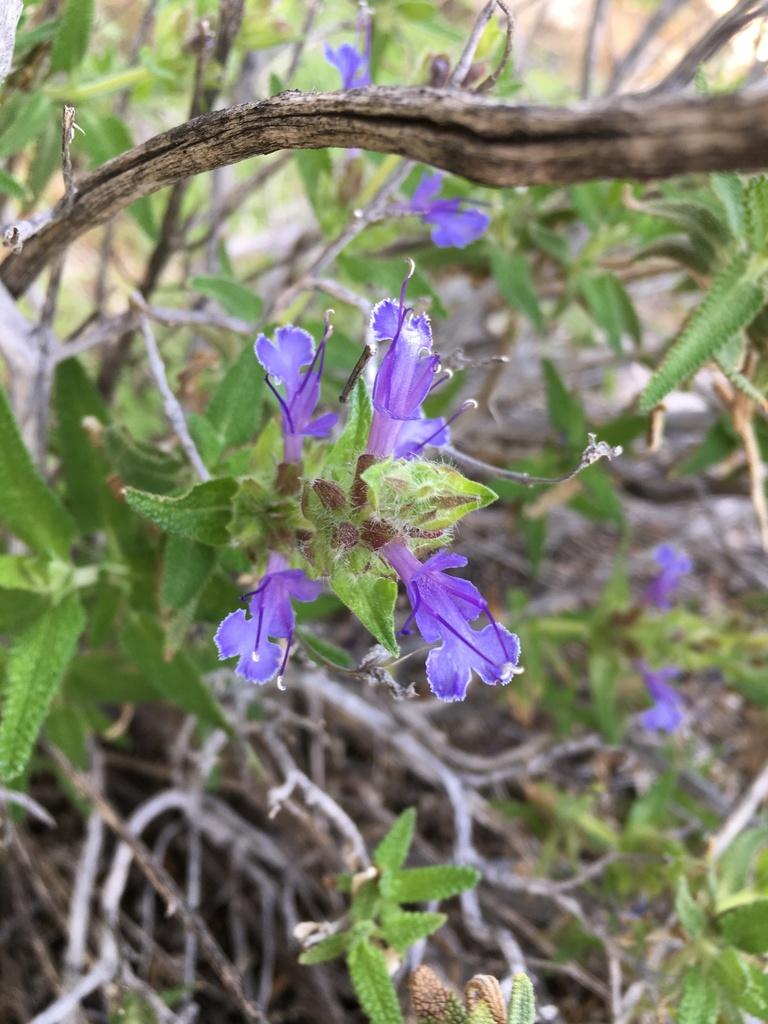

Scientific classification
- Kingdom: Plantae
- Clade: Tracheophytes
- Clade: Angiosperms
- Clade: Eudicots
- Clade: Asterids
- Order: Lamiales
- Family: Lamiaceae
- Genus: Salvia
- Species: S. eremostachya

Binomial name
- Salvia eremostachya Jeps.

= Salvia eremostachya =

Species of shrub

Salvia eremostachya, the rose sage, sand sage, or Californian desert sage, is a perennial shrub native to the western edge of the Colorado Desert. It reaches 2 to 3 ft (0.61 to 0.91 m) high, with purplish green bracts on .75 in (1.9 cm) flowers that range from blue to rose to nearly white. The flowers grow in whorled clusters, blooming from April to November.

The specific epithet, "eremostachya" (Greek for "desert stachys"), refers to the plants likeness to those of the genus Stachys.
