= Phoenix Points of Pride =

Cultural landmarks and attractions in Arizona, US

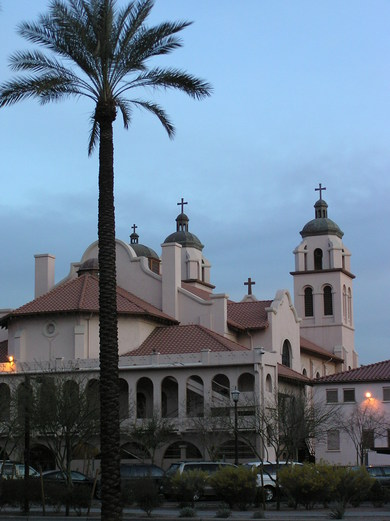
St. Mary's Basilica

The Phoenix Points of Pride are 31 landmarks and attractions in Phoenix, Arizona, selected by voters since 1992 to represent the city's best features for residents and visitors. They include structures, such as St. Mary's Basilica, the Phoenix Zoo and the Mortgage Matchup Center; and natural formations such as Camelback Mountain and Hole-in-the-Rock at Papago Park.

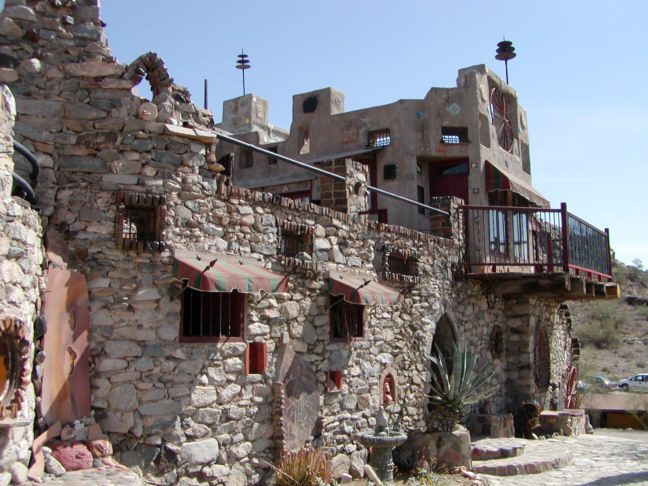
Mystery Castle

The first 25 Points of Pride were selected in 1992. The program was seen as a way to boost civic morale in the wake of negative national publicity for Phoenix in the wake of the Martin Luther King Jr. holiday controversy. Cricket Wireless Pavilion and the Deer Valley Rock Art Center were added in 1996 and 2000 respectively, and the Japanese Friendship Garden, Ben Avery Shooting Facility and the Thomas J. Pappas School were selected in 2004. Arizona State University at the West Campus, Burton Barr Central Library and Cutler-Plotkin Jewish Heritage Center (the area's first Jewish synagogue) are the most recent Points of Pride, selected in 2008.

The Phoenix Pride Commission maintains the list of Phoenix Points of Pride and promotes these unique metropolitan area resources. In the past, the commission accepted nominations from the residents and selected locations for the Points of Pride ballot. The residents voted for these locations and the commission determined how many of the locations receiving the greatest number of votes were designated as a Point of Pride.

In July 2008, Phoenix mayor Phil Gordon changed the Phoenix Pride Commission to an ad hoc commission, meaning that it will meet more infrequently to save money; this could mean the effective end of the Points of Pride program.

== List ==
This list describes each Phoenix Point of Pride:

Name	Location	Image	Description
Ak-Chin Pavilion	2121 North 83rd Avenue; 33.4715°N 112.232875°W		A 20,000-seat open-air amphitheater
Arizona Biltmore Hotel	2400 East Missouri Avenue; 33.523446°N 112.023404°W		A destination resort built in 1929 and featuring 39 acres of gardens and architecture influenced by Frank Lloyd Wright
Arizona Center	400 East Van Buren Street; 33.45231°N 112.068745°W		A shopping, dining, and entertainment destination
ASU West campus	4701 West Thunderbird Road; 33.608052°N 112.159855°W		A liberal arts campus of Arizona State University
Ben Avery Shooting Facility	4044 West Black Canyon Boulevard; 33.804078°N 112.145995°W		A 1650-acre outdoor shooting range open to the public
Burton Barr Central Library	1221 North Central Avenue; 33.46246°N 112.073224°W		A Public library of over 700,000 items, including rare books and unique collections
Camelback Mountain	East McDonald Drive at Tatum Boulevard; 33.514528°N 111.964466°W		A prominent feature of the Camelback Mountain Echo Canyon Recreation Area, a 75-acre park
Cutler Plotkin Jewish Heritage Center	122 East Culver Street; 33.462738°N 112.072534°W		A museum and cultural center operated by the Arizona Jewish Historical Society
Deer Valley Rock Art Center	3711 West Deer Valley Road; 33.683809°N 112.139839°W		A site of over 1500 Native-American petroglyphs ranging in age between 800 and 1500 years
Desert Botanical Garden	1201 N. Galvin Parkway; 33.462456°N 111.944639°W		A 140-acre desert garden featuring over 21,000 plants including 139 rare, threatened, or endangered species
Encanto Park	2745 North 15th Avenue; 33.47525°N 112.09016°W		A 222-acre park featuring a variety of leisure activities
Mortgage Matchup Center	201 East Jefferson Street; 33.445909°N 112.071213°W		A sports and entertainment arena and home to the Phoenix Suns and the Phoenix Mercury professional basketball teams
Heard Museum	2301 North Central Avenue; 33.472377°N 112.072393°W		A museum devoted to culture and history of Native peoples, including a collection of over 40,000 items
Herberger Theater Center	222 East Monroe Street; 33.45103°N 112.070772°W		A three-stage performing arts center
Heritage Square	115 North Sixth Street; 33.449902°N 112.065709°W		A late-1800s residential area supporting museums, restaurants and gift shops Rosson House NRHP Reference: 71000112; Baird Machine Shop NRHP Reference: 85002047
Japanese Friendship Garden	1125 North Third Avenue; 33.460887°N 112.077418°W		A joint project between Phoenix and its sister city of Himeji, Japan, the 3-1/2 acre garden and tea house include over 50 varieties of plants
Mystery Castle	800 East Mineral Road; 33.35644°N 112.062141°W		An 18-room castle museum built in the 1930s from salvaged items
Orpheum Theater	203 West Adams Street; 33.449132°N 112.076706°W		A 1929 Orpheum theater built in the Spanish Baroque style and currently home to the Phoenix Metropolitan Opera; NRHP Reference: 85002067
Papago Park	Galvin Parkway and Van Buren Street; 33.454879°N 111.948348°W		A 1200-acre park featuring the Phoenix Zoo, the Desert Botanical Garden, Governor Hunt's Tomb, baseball and softball fields, picnic areas, and hiking trails Hunt's Tomb NRHP Reference: 08000526
Phoenix Art Museum	1625 North Central Avenue; 33.466181°N 112.073366°W		A collection of more than 18,000 works, independent film screenings, live performances, dining and shopping
Phoenix Mountains Park	2701 East Squaw Peak Lane; 33.546724°N 112.021286°W		A park surrounding Piestewa Peak, the second highest point in the Phoenix Mountains, and within the area of the Phoenix Mountain Preserve
Phoenix Zoo	455 North Galvin Parkway; 33.451307°N 111.947982°W		A 125-acre zoo containing over 2.5 miles of walking trail and over 1300 animals in the area of Papago Park
Pueblo Grande Museum	4619 East Washington Street; 33.446232°N 111.984438°W		A pre-Columbian archaeological site and National Historic Landmark dedicated to preserving ruins left by the Hohokam culture Ruin NRHP Reference: 66000185; Irrigation Site NRHP Reference: 66000184
Shemer Art Center and Museum	5005 East Camelback Road; 33.504902°N 111.972164°W		An arts education facility and community center featuring temporary exhibitions and a permanent collection
South Mountain Park	10919 South Central Avenue; 33.347056°N 112.084518°W		An urban park over 16,000-acres containing many species of desert plant and animal life
St. Mary's Basilica	231 North Third Street; 33.45069°N 112.069732°W		A minor basilica in the Catholic Church and home to Arizona's largest collection of stained glass NRHP Reference: 78000551
Symphony Hall	225 East Adams Street; 33.448841°N 112.070563°W		A multi-purpose performing arts venue and home to the Phoenix Symphony, Arizona Opera, and Ballet Arizona
Telephone Pioneers of America Park	1946 West Morningside Drive; 33.649261°N 112.101758°W		A barrier-free park designed to meet the needs of disabled people
Tovrea Castle	5041 East Van Buren Street; 33.448738°N 111.972252°W		A three-tier, wedding cake style structure built in 1931 of wood and stucco NRHP Reference: 96000309
Wesley Bolin Memorial Plaza	1700 West Washington Street; 33.44812°N 112.094291°W		A two-block plaza on the grounds of the Arizona State Capitol featuring 29 memorials
Wrigley Mansion	2501 East Telawa Trail; 33.523052°N 112.026635°W		A 1931 mansion offering a restaurant and meeting space in a private club setting NRHP Reference: 89001045

== See also ==
- List of historic properties in Phoenix, Arizona
