= German submarine U-185 =

German World War II submarine

- U-185 sinking after being hit by US depth charges, 24 August 1943

History

Nazi Germany
- Name: U-185
- Ordered: 15 August 1940
- Builder: DeSchiMAG AG Weser, Bremen
- Yard number: 1025
- Laid down: 1 July 1941
- Launched: 2 March 1942
- Commissioned: 13 June 1942
- Fate: Sunk, by US aircraft on 24 August 1943

General characteristics
- Class & type: Type IXC/40 submarine
- Displacement: 1,144 t (1,126 long tons) surfaced; 1,257 t (1,237 long tons) submerged
- Length: 76.76 m (251 ft 10 in) o/a; 58.75 m (192 ft 9 in) pressure hull
- Beam: 6.86 m (22 ft 6 in) o/a; 4.44 m (14 ft 7 in) pressure hull
- Height: 9.60 m (31 ft 6 in)
- Draught: 4.67 m (15 ft 4 in)
- Installed power: 4,400 PS (3,200 kW; 4,300 bhp) (diesels); 1,000 PS (740 kW; 990 shp) (electric)
- Propulsion: 2 shafts; 2 × diesel engines; 2 × electric motors
- Speed: 18.3 knots (33.9 km/h; 21.1 mph) surfaced; 7.3 knots (13.5 km/h; 8.4 mph) submerged
- Range: 13,850 nmi (25,650 km; 15,940 mi) at 10 knots (19 km/h; 12 mph) surfaced; 63 nmi (117 km; 72 mi) at 4 knots (7.4 km/h; 4.6 mph) submerged
- Test depth: 230 m (750 ft)
- Complement: 4 officers, 44 enlisted
- Armament: 6 × torpedo tubes (4 bow, 2 stern); 22 × 53.3 cm (21 in) torpedoes; 1 × 10.5 cm (4.1 in) SK C/32 deck gun (180 rounds); 1 × 3.7 cm (1.5 in) SK C/30 AA gun; 1 × twin 2 cm FlaK 30 AA guns

Service record
- Part of: 4th U-boat Flotilla; 13 June 1942 – 31 October 1942; 10th U-boat Flotilla; 1 November 1942 – 24 August 1943
- Identification codes: M 05 635
- Commanders: Kptlt. August Maus; 13 June 1942 – 24 August 1943
- Operations: 3 patrols: 1st patrol: 27 October 1942 – 1 January 1943; 2nd patrol: 8 February – 3 May 1943; 3rd patrol: 9 June – 24 August 1943
- Victories: 9 merchant ships sunk (62,761 GRT); 1 merchant ship damaged (6,840 GRT); 2 aircraft shot down

German submarine U-185 was a Type IXC/40 U-boat of Nazi Germany's Kriegsmarine built for service during World War II.

Under the command of Kapitänleutnant August Maus, she had some success against Allied aircraft in World War II.

Laid down on 1 July 1941 by DeSchiMAG AG Weser of Bremen as yard number 1025, she was launched on 2 March 1942 and commissioned on 13 June. She suffered no casualties until her sinking by US carrier-borne aircraft on 24 August 1943 at 27°00′N 37°06′W. Twenty-nine of the crew were lost, as well as fourteen survivors from U-604 who were on board.

== Design ==
German Type IXC/40 submarines were slightly larger than the original Type IXCs. U-185 had a displacement of 1,144 tonnes (1,126 long tons) when at the surface and 1,257 tonnes (1,237 long tons) while submerged. The U-boat had a total length of 76.76 m (251 ft 10 in), a pressure hull length of 58.75 m (192 ft 9 in), a beam of 6.86 m (22 ft 6 in), a height of 9.60 m (31 ft 6 in), and a draught of 4.67 m (15 ft 4 in). The submarine was powered by two MAN M 9 V 40/46 supercharged four-stroke, nine-cylinder diesel engines producing a total of 4,400 metric horsepower (3,240 kW; 4,340 shp) for use while surfaced, two Siemens-Schuckert 2 GU 345/34 double-acting electric motors producing a total of 1,000 shaft horsepower (1,010 PS; 750 kW) for use while submerged. She had two shafts and two 1.92 m (6 ft) propellers. The boat was capable of operating at depths of up to 230 metres (750 ft).

The submarine had a maximum surface speed of 18.3 knots (33.9 km/h; 21.1 mph) and a maximum submerged speed of 7.3 knots (13.5 km/h; 8.4 mph). When submerged, the boat could operate for 63 nautical miles (117 km; 72 mi) at 4 knots (7.4 km/h; 4.6 mph); when surfaced, she could travel 13,850 nautical miles (25,650 km; 15,940 mi) at 10 knots (19 km/h; 12 mph). U-185 was fitted with six 53.3 cm (21 in) torpedo tubes (four fitted at the bow and two at the stern), 22 torpedoes, one 10.5 cm (4.13 in) SK C/32 naval gun, 180 rounds, and a 3.7 cm (1.5 in) SK C/30 as well as a 2 cm (0.79 in) C/30 anti-aircraft gun. The boat had a complement of forty-eight.

== Service history ==
=== First patrol ===
U-185 sailed from Kiel on 27 October 1942. On 7 December she sank the unescorted 5,476 GRT British cargo ship Peter Mærsk west of the Azores. She docked at Lorient in France on 1 January 1943 after 67 days at sea.

=== Second patrol ===
U-185 sailed from Lorient on 8 February 1943. On 10 March she attacked Convoy KG 123 between Cuba and Hispaniola, sinking the 6,151 GRT American tanker Virginia Sinclair and the 7,177 GRT liberty ship James Sprunt. On 6 April U-185 attacked the four-ship convoy GTMO-83, sinking the 7,176 GRT liberty ship John Sevier. She then sailed to Bordeaux on 3 May after 85 days at sea.

=== Third patrol ===
On 14 June she was attacked in the Bay of Biscay by a British Whitley bomber of 10 OTU (Operational Training Unit) based at RAF St Eval in Cornwall. U-564 was sunk, but U-185's flak defenses damaged the aircraft, forcing it to ditch.

On 7 July U-185, off Cape San Roque, Brazil, attacked the convoy BT-18, sinking the liberty ships James Robertson and Thomas Sinnickson, the 7,061 GRT tanker William Boyce Thompson also went to the bottom. She then badly damaged the 6,840 GRT tanker S.B. Hunt. On 12 July, around 90 miles off Recife, Brazil, the U-boat was attacked by a B-24 Liberator bomber of US Navy Squadron VB-107, sustaining only minor damage.

The boat sank the 8,235 GRT Brazilian cargo ship Bagé, a straggler from convoy TJ-2, off the Rio Real, Brazil, on 1 August and on the sixth, torpedoed and then sank with gunfire the unescorted 7,133 GRT British cargo ship Fort Halkett about 600 miles (970 km) southeast of Natal, Brazil. On 3 August U-185 was attacked by a Ventura bomber of Squadron VB-107 with depth charges, wounding one man.

==== Sinking ====
On the morning of 11 August 1943 U-185 rendezvoused with U-604, which had been badly damaged after two attacks by US aircraft and the destroyer USS Moffett. The stricken submarine began transferring provisions, fuel oil and spare parts to U-185. U-172 arrived later to assist, but the concentration of U-boats was detected by HF/DF. Consequently, the surfaced boats were attacked by a United States Navy PBY-4 Liberator, of Squadron VB-107. U-172 escaped, the crew of U-185 opened fire with AA guns, destroying the aircraft and her three-man crew.

After U-604 was scuttled, U-185 headed for home with 100 men crammed aboard a vessel designed for 54. On 16 August she transferred 23 men to U-172. Short of fuel, U-185 was heading for a rendezvous with U-847 south-west of the Azores on the morning of 24 August. The U-boat was spotted by a Grumman TBF-1 Avenger and Grumman F4F Wildcat attack team of Squadron VC-13, flying from the escort carrier USS Core. The aircraft attacked with machine guns and depth charges, killing the U-boat's lookouts and AA crew and rupturing the pressure hull, allowing seawater to reach the battery cells, producing toxic chlorine gas. One diesel engine caught fire, producing more fumes, and all electrical systems were knocked out, plunging the vessel into darkness.

Realizing that the situation was hopeless, Maus ordered all hands to abandon ship. More than 40 men managed to reach the deck and jump into the sea as U-185 sank. Only 36 of them would be rescued by the destroyer USS Barker, the rest succumbing to wounds or chlorine poisoning. The 25 men from U-185 were POWs before returning to Germany three years later.

On 21 September 1943 Kapitänleutnant August Maus was awarded the Knight's Cross of the Iron Cross.

=== Wolfpacks ===
U-185 took part in one wolfpack, namely:

- Westwall (8 November - 16 December 1942)

== Summary of raiding history ==
Date	Ship	Nationality	Tonnage (GRT)	Fate
7 December 1942	Peter Mærsk	United Kingdom	5,476	Sunk
10 March 1943	Virginia Sinclair	United States	6,151	Sunk
10 March 1943	James Sprunt	United States	7,177	Sunk
6 April 1943	John Sevier	United States	7,176	Sunk
7 July 1943	James Robertson	United States	7,176	Sunk
7 July 1943	Thomas Sinnickson	United States	7,176	Sunk
7 July 1943	William Boyce Thompson	United States	7,061	Sunk
7 July 1943	S.B. Hunt	United States	6,840	Damaged
1 August 1943	Bagé	Brazil	8,235	Sunk
6 August 1943	Fort Halkett	United Kingdom	7,133	Sunk

== Bibliography ==
- Busch, Rainer; Röll, Hans-Joachim (1999). German U-boat commanders of World War II : a biographical dictionary. Translated by Brooks, Geoffrey. London, Annapolis, Md: Greenhill Books, Naval Institute Press. ISBN 1-55750-186-6.
- Busch, Rainer; Röll, Hans-Joachim (1999). Deutsche U-Boot-Verluste von September 1939 bis Mai 1945 [German U-boat losses from September 1939 to May 1945]. Der U-Boot-Krieg (in German). Vol. IV. Hamburg, Berlin, Bonn: Mittler. ISBN 3-8132-0514-2.
- Gröner, Erich; Jung, Dieter; Maass, Martin (1991). U-boats and Mine Warfare Vessels. German Warships 1815–1945. Vol. 2. Translated by Thomas, Keith; Magowan, Rachel. London: Conway Maritime Press. ISBN 0-85177-593-4.
