= Great Papago Escape =

WWII Axis prisoner-of-war escape in Arizona

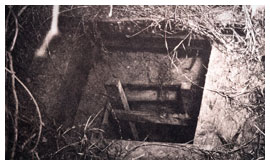
- The entrance to the tunnel was concealed by a large box of coal.
- Date: December 23, 1944 – January 28, 1945
- Location: Camp Papago Park, Arizona, United States
- Participants: Jürgen Wattenberg; Hans-Werner Kraus; Friedrich Guggenberger; August Maus

The Great Papago Escape was the largest Axis prisoner-of-war escape to occur from an American facility during World War II. On the night of December 23, 1944, twenty-five Germans tunneled out of Camp Papago Park, near Phoenix, Arizona, and fled into the surrounding desert.

Over the next few weeks, all of the escapees were eventually recaptured without bloodshed. Although most were apprehended within Maricopa County, a few nearly made it to the border of Mexico, which is about 210 km (130 miles) south of the camp.

== Background ==
Camp Papago Park was built in 1943 and located in Papago Park, a public recreational area in eastern Phoenix. Initially, the camp was to be used for Italian prisoners of war, but by January 1944 it had been designated for German prisoners only, most of whom were from the Kriegsmarine. The camp consisted of five separate compounds; one for officers and the rest for enlisted men. At its peak, the population of the camp was about 3,100, excluding the 371 American guards and officers.

Camp Papago Park was a typical prison camp in terms of appearance, surrounded by barbed wire and watch towers, but it was unusual in that prisoners were not required to work or study. To combat boredom, many of the Germans volunteered to work, and were assigned as laborers in the nearby cotton fields and the like.

Many of the men in the officers' compound were U-boat sailors, including the commander, Captain Jürgen Wattenberg, who was the highest-ranking German prisoner at the camp. He was a veteran of the Battle of the River Plate, as well as the commander of U-162, which was sunk off Trinidad by the Royal Navy in September 1942. Because by that date the United States and Germany were at war, the British transferred Wattenberg and his crew into American custody.

According to author Cecil Owen, "Wattenberg was shuffled from one camp to another, for nobody wanted to keep him. He was considered a 'Super Nazi' because he caused trouble everywhere he was sent. Finally he was transferred to Papago Park prisoner of war camp, in the Arizona desert." Wattenberg was not alone though: The American commander of the camp made the mistake of putting all of the most troublesome and escape-prone inmates in the officers' compound together, instead of dispersing them. The camp's provost marshal, Captain Cecil Parshall, was the only one to see a problem with this arrangement. Parshall pointed out that there was a spot in the officer's compound that could not be seen from the guard towers, making it ideal for an escape. He also said that the "German [prisoners] were a fine bunch of men, smart as hell, [a]nd it made no sense to put the smartest of them in Compound 1 [officer's compound]. I knew they would discover that blind spot."

Wattenberg began planning an escape as soon as he arrived at the camp, and he chose the blind spot to be the site of the tunnel's entrance. The blind spot was next to a bathhouse, the structure closest to the camp's eastern perimeter. Wattenberg had his men start the tunnel from inside the building. When the Germans went to take a shower, they could easily enter the tunnel to dig instead. To hide the entrance of the tunnel, the Germans removed part of the wooden wall inside the bathhouse and placed a large box full of coal in front of it. Wattenberg asked the Americans to give his men tools, such as shovels, ostensibly for work in their gardens and the construction of a volleyball field, but really for use in the tunnel. Because Arizona's soil is known for being rocky and compact, the Americans never expected that the Germans might use the tools for digging a tunnel. They assigned the prisoners two shovels and two rakes, which were to be turned in at the end of every day.

Work on the tunnel began sometime in September 1944 and was carried out by three groups of three men, who worked for ninety-minute shifts during the night. One man would dig with a pick and coal shovel, the second would gather the dirt with a bucket, and the third would pull the dirt out of the shaft and keep watch. A fourth group would get rid of the dirt. At first, the Germans flushed the dirt down the toilets, hid it in the attics, or dropped it down their pant legs into the gardens, but after the tunnel started getting long they began spreading it out on the volleyball field. The Americans never noticed the disturbed dirt. Because the volleyball field was under construction, the guards became used to seeing piles of dirt and thought nothing of them. When the Germans completed their tunnel on December 20, it measured 178 feet (54 m) long, from the bathhouse east to the Cross Cut Canal, with a 6-foot (1.8 m) vertical entrance shaft. They made related preparations. Wattenberg managed to secure new clothing and fake documents for his men, including contact information for people in Mexico who would help them get back to Germany. He also rationed food in order to save some for the escape, and made arrangements to have other prisoners who were staying behind to create a distraction with loud celebrations on the night of December 23.

Wattenberg's plan was to get as far away from the camp as possible before the guards realized the men were gone. To buy time, four U-boat captains informed the Americans that they and the other officers would no longer appear for roll call unless it was conducted by an officer. The American commander did not accept this and put the entire compound on a restricted diet for every day the officers refused to appear. The roll call strike lasted 16 days and ended with a compromise: all men, regardless of rank, would be present for roll call every morning except Sunday at 9:00 AM, and every afternoon at 4:15 PM. By tacit agreement, those above the rank of a lieutenant captain could stand in the doorways of their barracks to be counted. The Germans got what they wanted, so the date of the escape was set for Saturday, December 23, 1944.

== The escape ==
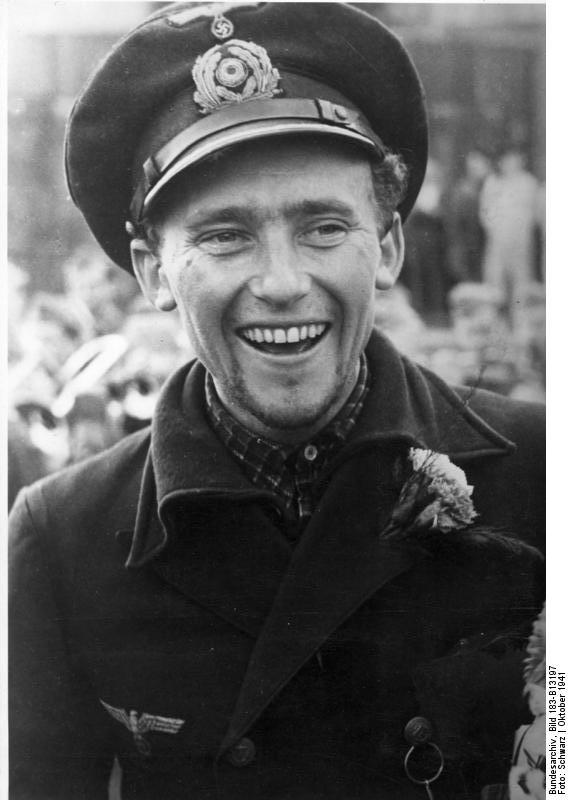
Lieutenant Friedrich Guggenberger in October 1941

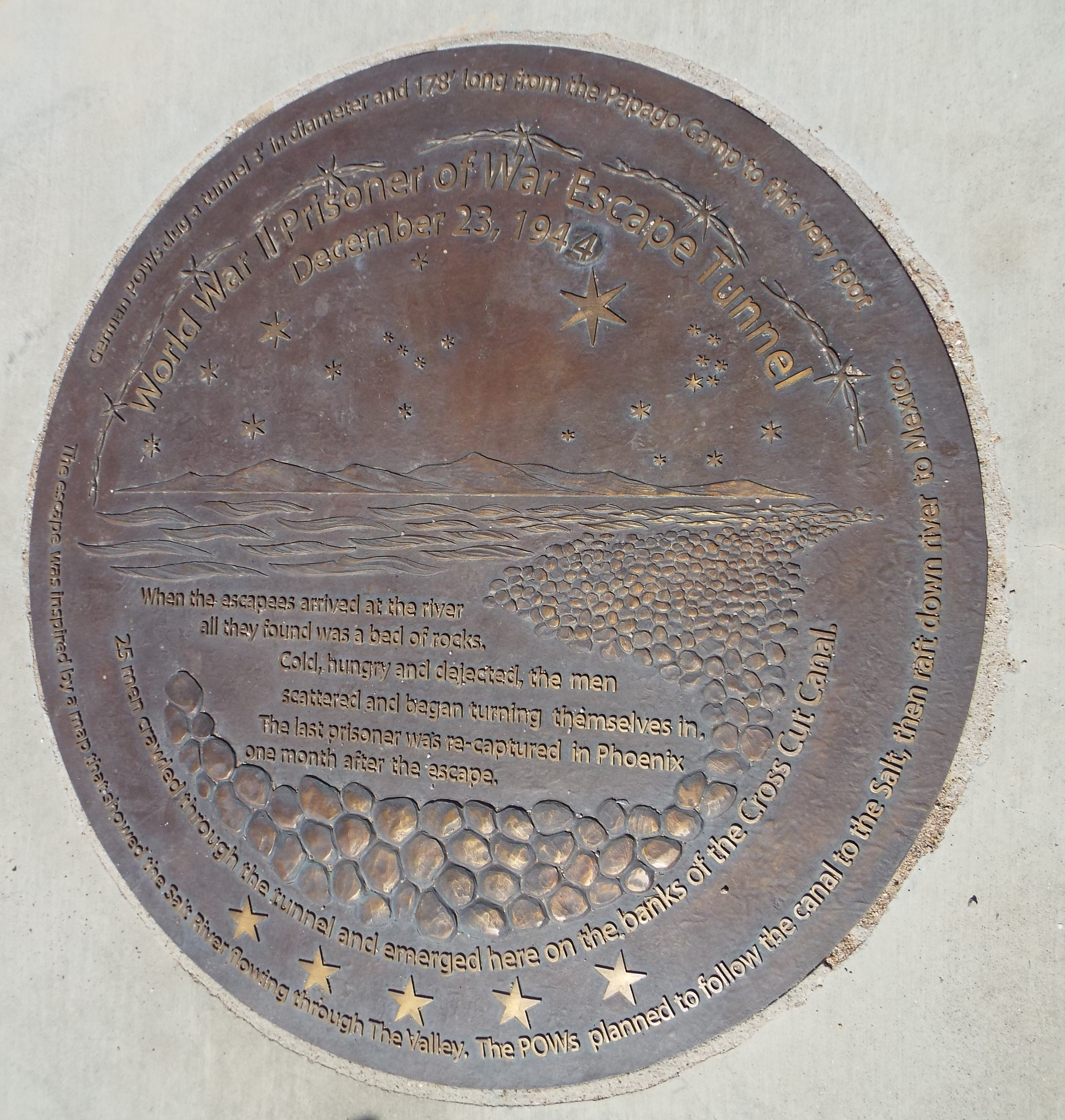
Papago Escape Tunnel exit marker

The escape began at 9:00 PM on December 23. By 2:30 AM on December 24, Wattenberg and twenty-four other men had made it through the tunnel without alarming the guards. Inside the Cross Cut Canal, the Germans headed south toward the Salt River. Captain Wilhelm Günther and Lieutenants Wolfgang Clarus and Friedrich Utzolino built a collapsible raft out of wood and scraps of rubber, hoping to float their way down the Salt River, to the Gila River, to the Colorado River, and into the Gulf of California. But they found there was very little water in the Salt River and they abandoned the raft after a short time. The others split up into pairs and small groups and went separate ways, avoiding trains and buses.

By 7:00 PM on December 24, Captain Parshall was certain that some prisoners were missing. Soon after, several hundred soldiers, FBI agents, and Papago Indian scouts were mobilized for what the Phoenix Gazette called "the greatest manhunt in Arizona history". Most escapees were recaptured because of hunger, the cold and rainy weather, and being unfamiliar with the terrain. Many surrendered within the first few days after escaping, but a few others held out for much longer. On January 1, 1945, two unnamed prisoners were captured by Papago scouts less than 48 km (30 miles) from the Mexican border. Soon after, Captain Lieutenants Friedrich Guggenberger and Jürgen Quaet-Faslem were captured within 16 km (10 miles) of the border. Günther, Clarus, and Utzolino, were caught on January 8 after the latter decided that a canal near the town of Gila Bend would be a good place to wash his underwear. Some cowboys spotted the group at the canal and alerted the military.

The final holdout was Captain Wattenberg, who was captured over a month after the escape on January 28, 1945. Instead of heading south, Wattenberg and two of his subordinates, Walter Kozur and Johann Kremer, made shelter in a cave in the mountains north of Phoenix. From there they explored the area and ventured into the city. According to author Ronald H. Bailey, Kremer "pulled off the most bizarre caper of the entire escape". Every few days he would make contact with one of the German workers sent outside the camp's perimeter and exchange places with him. The exchanged prisoner would spend the night in the cave with Captain Wattenberg while Kremer slipped back into camp. Inside, Kremer would gather food and information. To deliver the food he would either join a work detail and escape again, or send it out with another worker. This continued until January 22, when a surprise inspection revealed Kremer's presence in camp. Kremer must have given his captors information, because the next night Kozur was captured by three soldiers at the abandoned car used to hide the provisions. Four days later, on January 27, 1945, Wattenberg cleaned up and hiked into Phoenix. He had 75¢, most of which he spent on a meal at a restaurant. He slept in a chair in a hotel lobby for a few hours, and then walked around the streets at night. While walking, he asked for directions from a member of a street cleaning crew. The cleaner found Wattenberg's accent to be suspicious, called the police, and Wattenberg was arrested by 9 AM the next morning.

== Aftermath ==
At least some of the escapees expected severe punishment for escaping; they were aware that 50 Allied prisoners of war had been executed after escape by their German captors in Stalag Luft III. However, the Camp Papago Park escapees were only limited to bread and water rations for as many days as they were absent from camp. None of the American guards was seriously punished, but the FBI launched an investigation into lax security at Arizona's prisoner of war camps.

Today, the site of Camp Papago Park is used in part as an Arizona National Guard base. The Arizona Military Museum, located on the base, features a display describing the camp and the story of the escape.

== See also ==
- Arizona during World War II
- Military history of the United States during World War II
