= Papago Park =

Municipal park in Maricopa County, Arizona

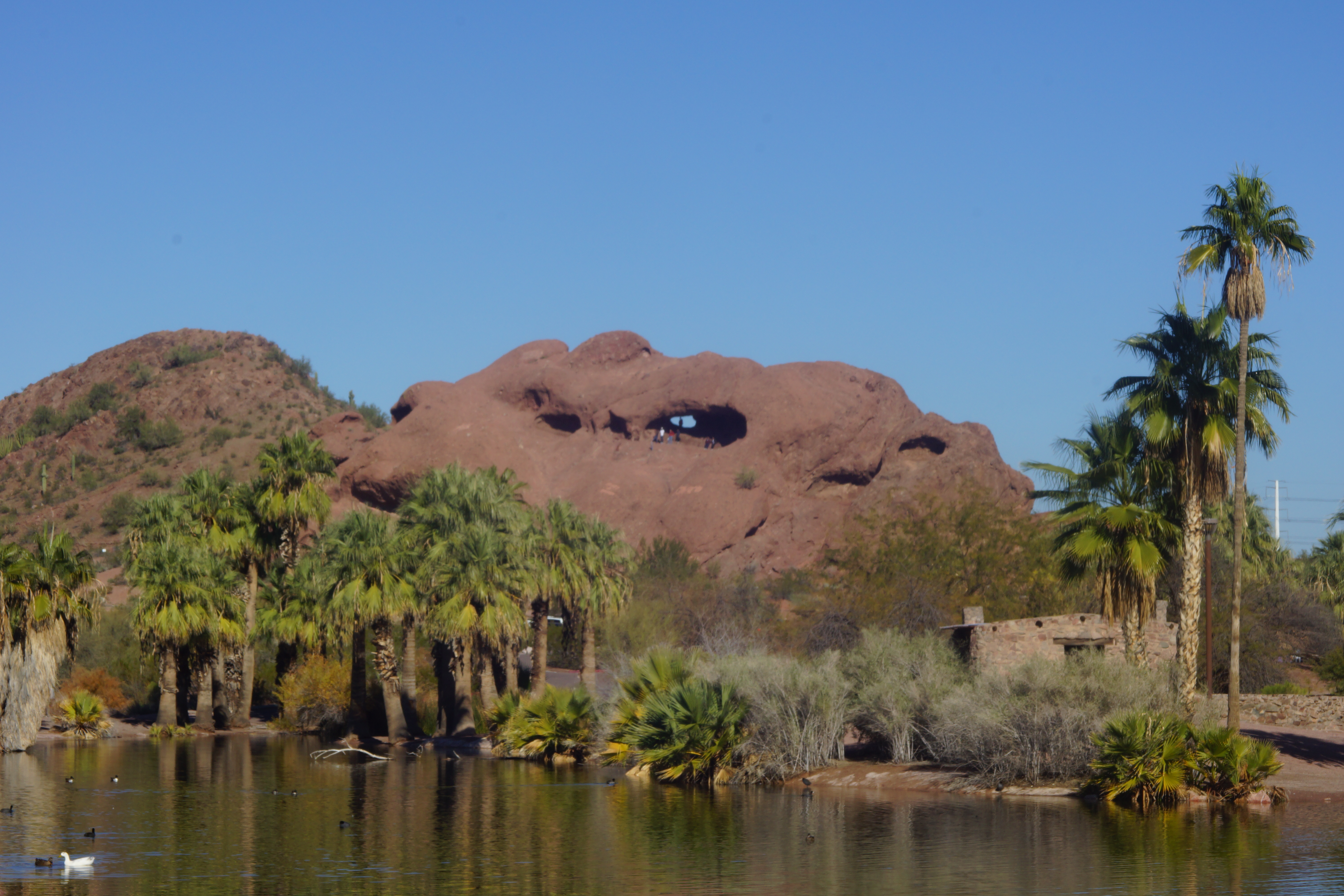
- Interactive map of Papago Park
- Location: Phoenix and Tempe, Arizona
- Nearest city: Scottsdale, Arizona
- Coordinates: 33.452°N 111.948°W
- Area: 1,496 acres (6.05 km^{2})
- Operator: Cities of Phoenix and Tempe, Arizona

Papago Park (/ˈpæpəɡoʊ/) is a municipal park of the cities of Phoenix and Tempe, Arizona, United States. It has been designated as a Phoenix Point of Pride. It includes Hunt's Tomb, which is listed on the National Register of Historic Places.

== Description ==
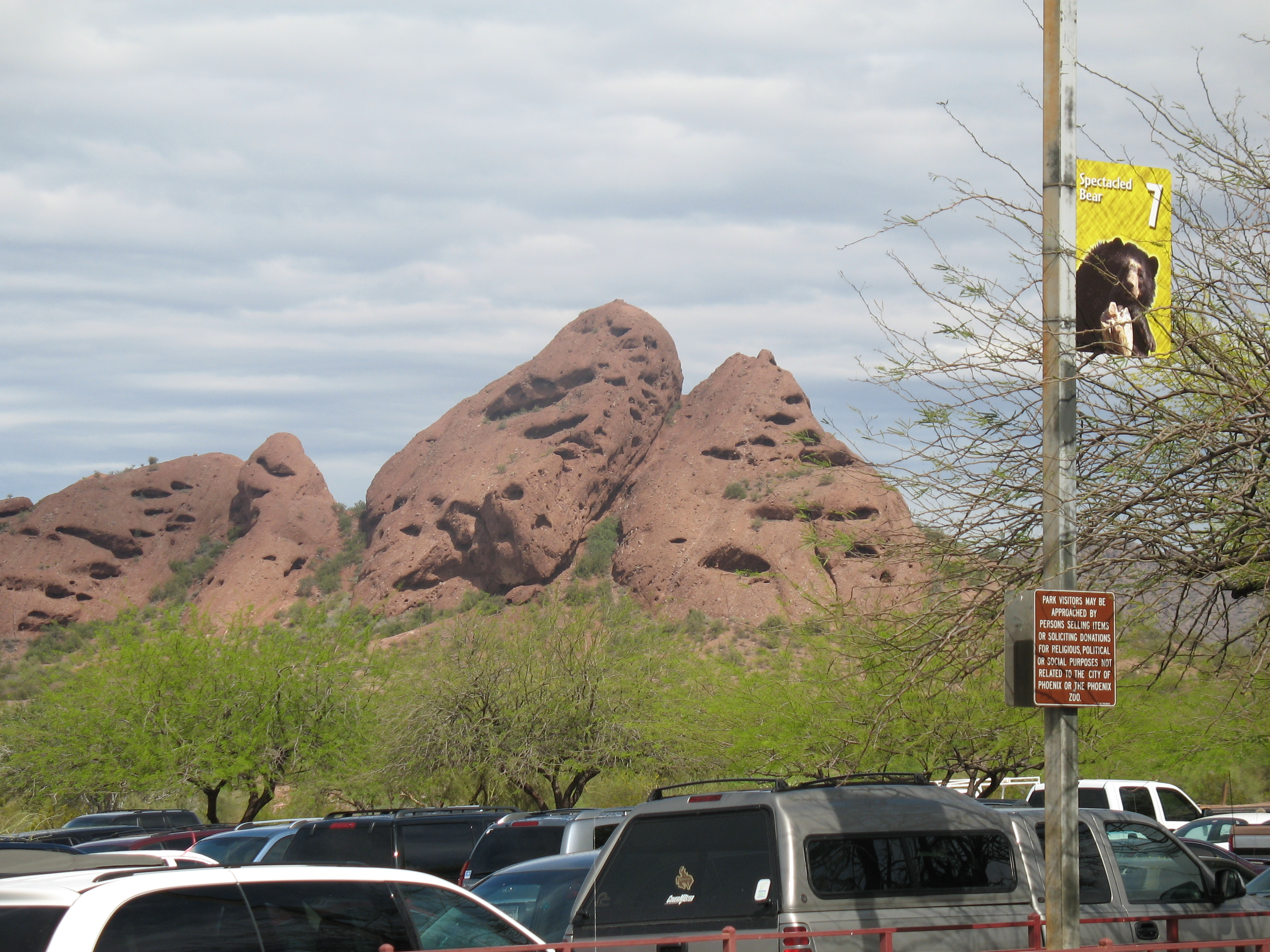
View from the Phoenix Zoo entrance

Papago Park is a hilly desert park covering 1200 acres in its Phoenix extent and 296 acres in its Tempe extent. Tempe refers to its section of the park specifically as Tempe Papago Park.

Papago Park is notable for its many distinctive geological formations and its wide variety of typical desert plants, including the giant saguaro cactus. The park also features the Desert Botanical Garden, the Phoenix Zoo, the Arizona Heritage Center, picnic areas, several small lakes, hiking trails, bicycle paths, a fire museum, as well as Hunt's Tomb, the pyramidal tomb of Arizona's first governor, George W. P. Hunt. Tempe Papago Park includes baseball and softball fields, picnic ramadas, a small lake and other features. Rolling Hills Golf Course is within the park between its Phoenix and Tempe extremities.

The park includes the home baseball and softball stadium for North Pointe Preparatory.

== History ==
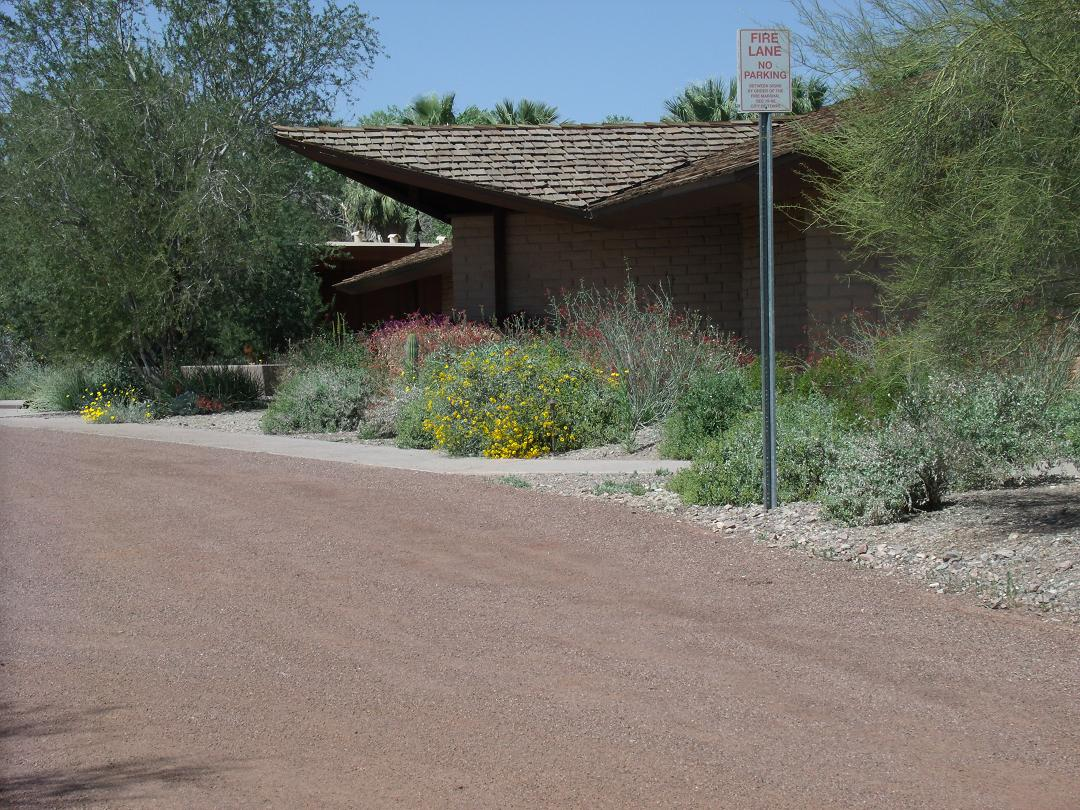
Sandra Day O'Connor's House, which was moved from the town of Paradise Valley, Arizona to Papago Park.

The distinctive red sandstone geological formations of Papago Park were formed some 6–15 million years ago. One such formation, Hole-in-the-Rock, is a major landmark, thanks to the openings (tafoni) eroded in the formation over time. There is some evidence that the Hohokam—a now-extinct aboriginal tribe that once lived in the Phoenix area—used the openings and sunlight to track the solstices.

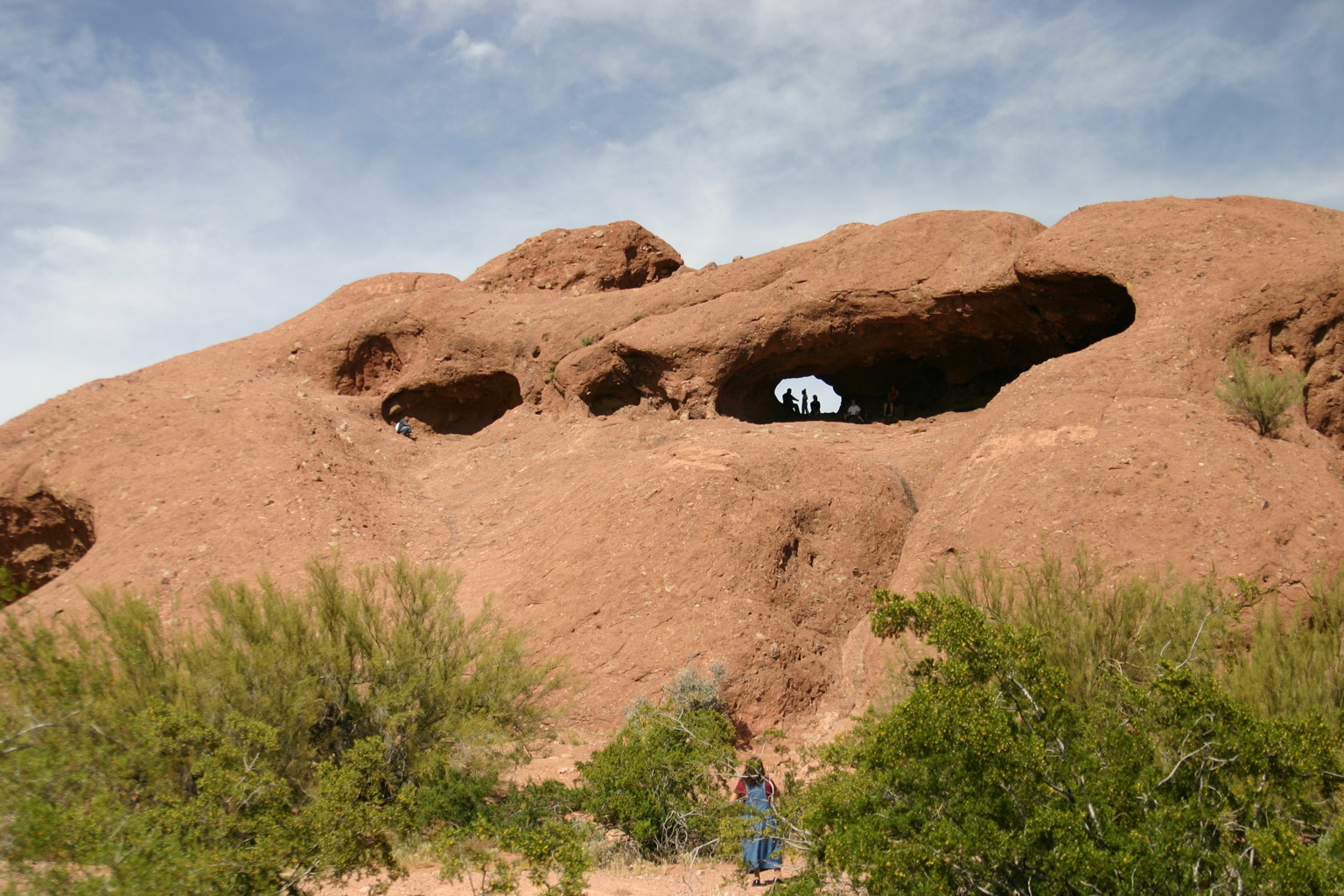
Hole in the Rock

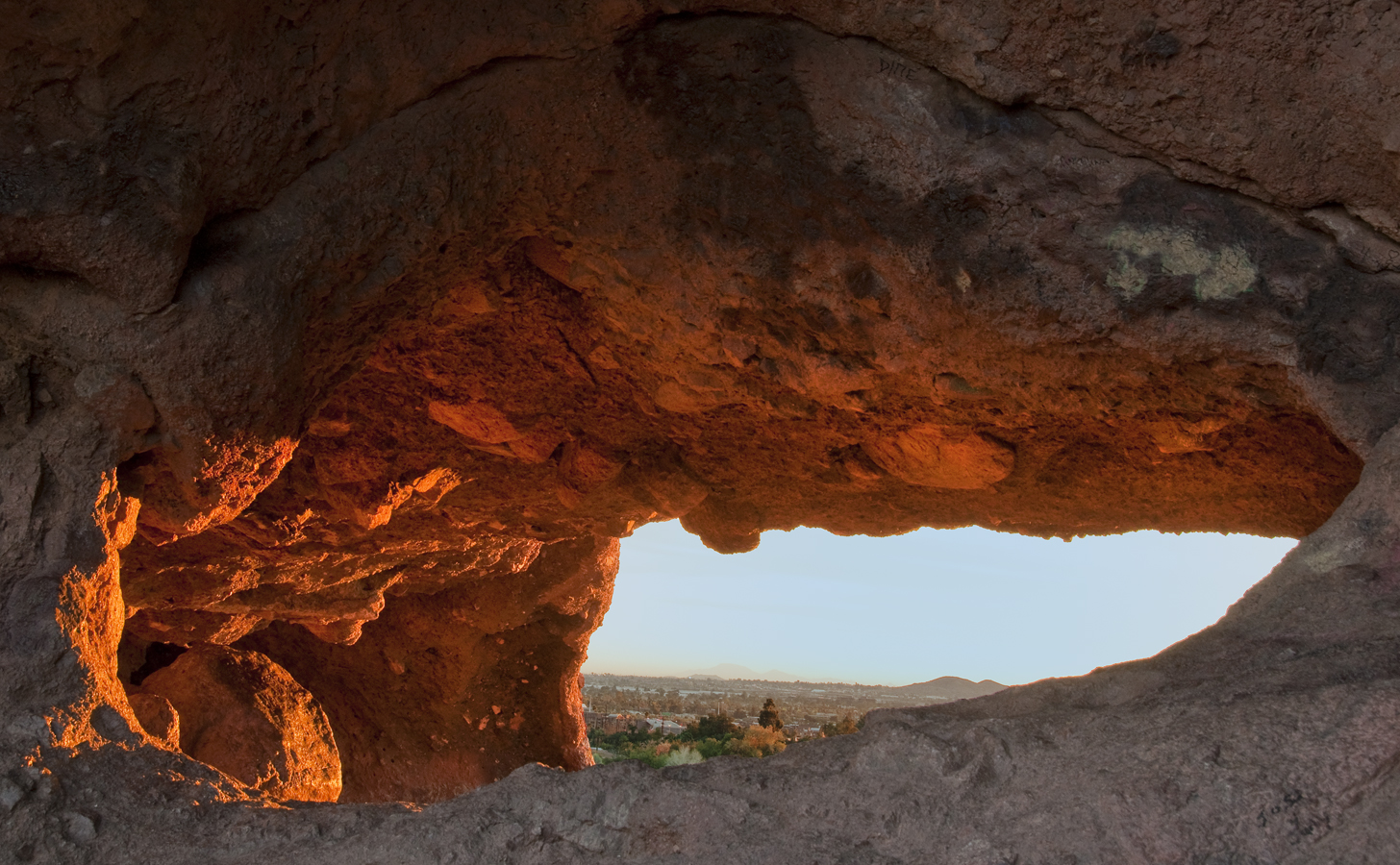
Inside Hole in the Rock

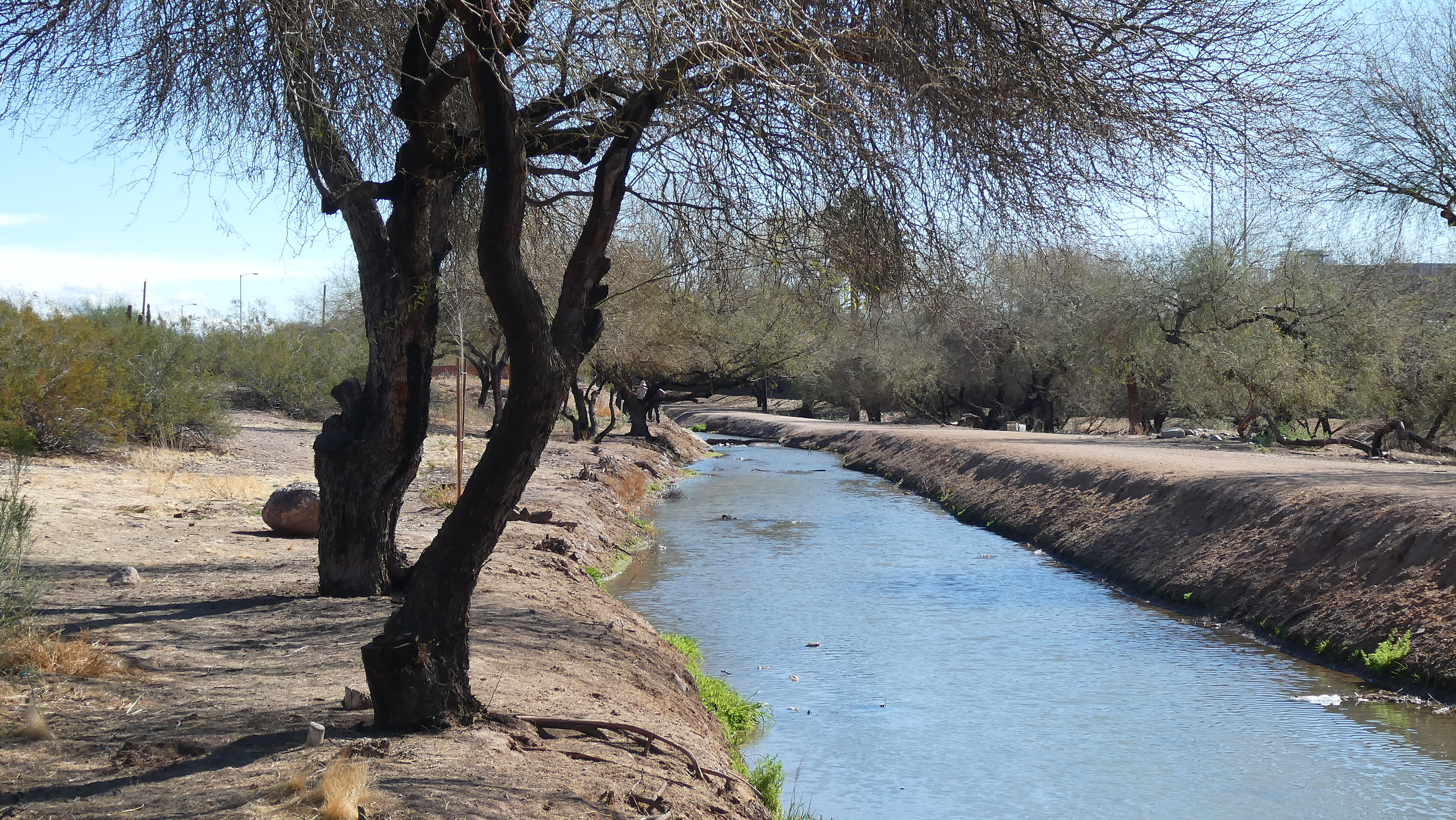
Old canal and mesquite bosque

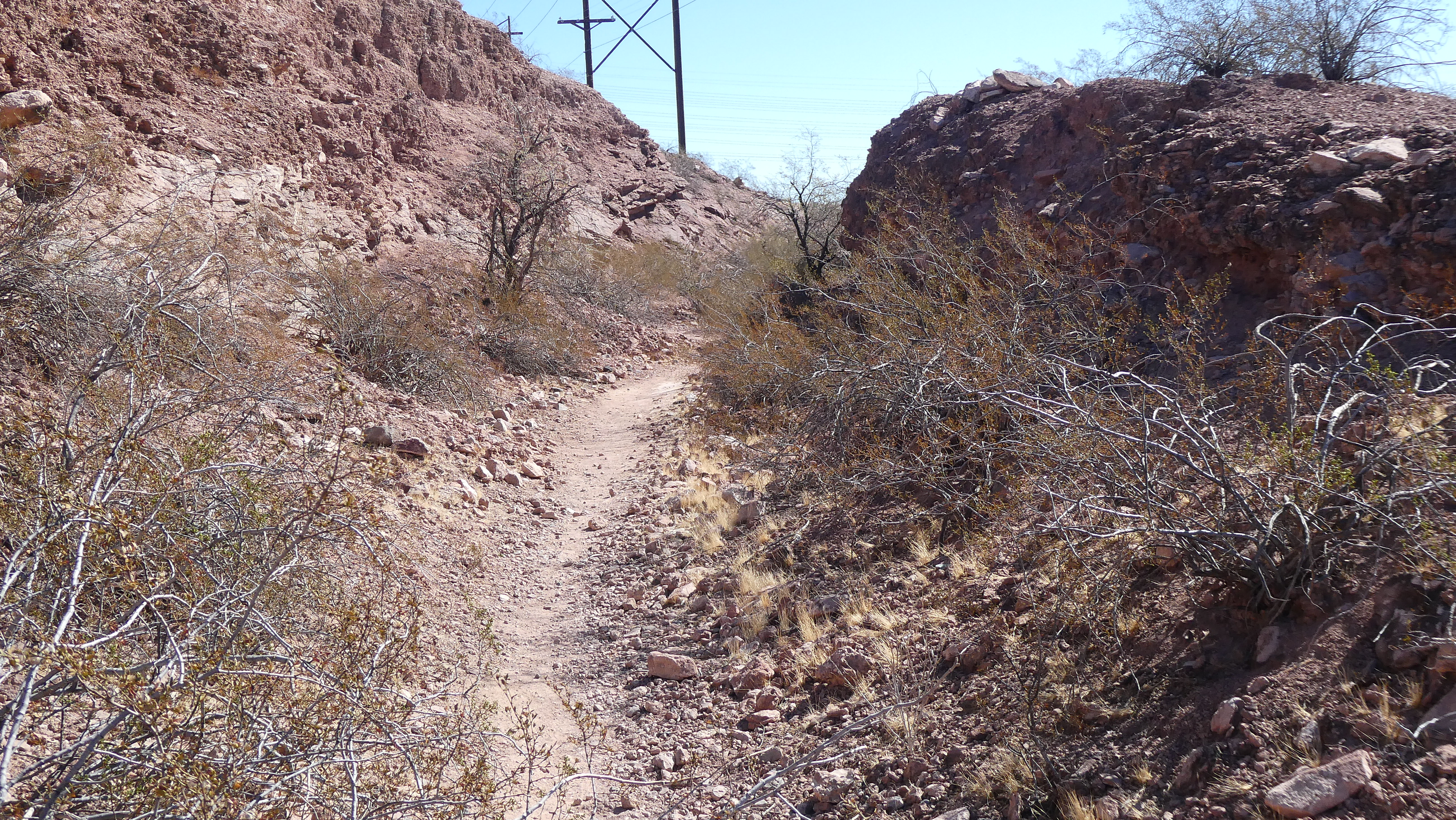
Old railroad cut of Phoenix & Eastern line

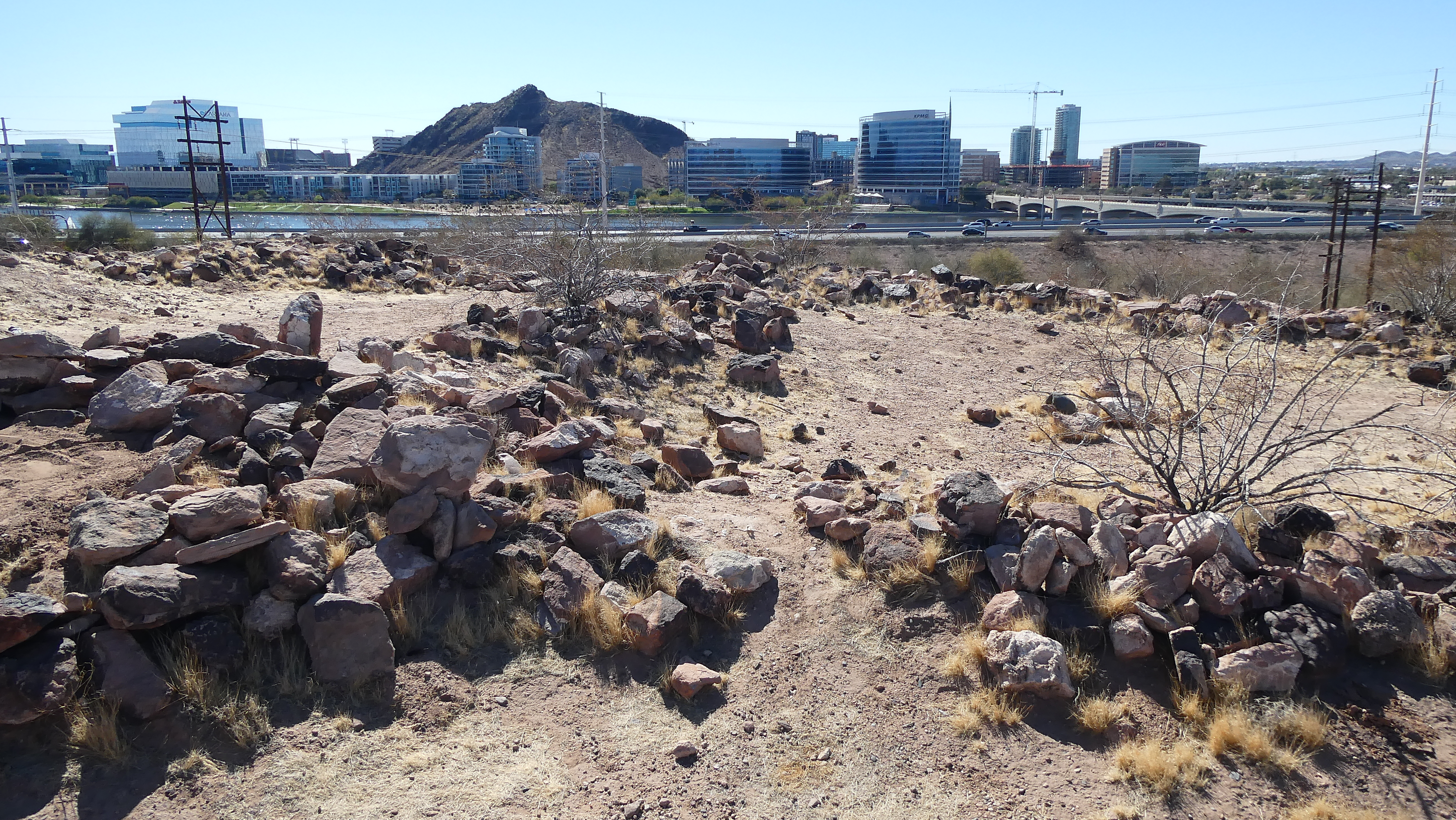
Hohokam archeological site with Tempe waterfront in background

There are also some signs of Precambrian granite in the park. The bedrock is concealed by only a thin layer of topsoil.

Papago Park was designated a reservation for the local Maricopa and Pima tribes of Native Americans in 1879. It became the Papago–Saguaro National Monument in 1914, but this status was recalled by Congress, April 7, 1930, because the area was not considered suitable for a national monument. It was divided amongst the state of Arizona, the city of Tempe and the Water Users Association, later known as the Salt River Project. The Federal government reserved all oil, coal or other mineral rights.

Following the onset of the Great Depression, Governor Hunt commissioned a bass fish hatchery to be established in Papago Park during 1932. The hatchery was built as a Works Progress Administration (WPA) project, and became successful, stocking largemouth bass and other fish for Arizona's waterways.

During World War II, Papago Park housed a POW camp and contained as many as 3,100 prisoners from 1942 to 1944. It was also the site of the largest mass escape from any United States prison camp in World War II. The Great Papago Escape occurred on December 23, 1944, when 25 prisoners, including German U-boat commander Jürgen Wattenberg, escaped the camp using a 178-foot tunnel and made their way to the Arizona desert. Many prisoners quickly realized that they knew nothing about the landscape or climate and turned themselves back in. Wattenberg was the last to be captured, on January 28, 1945.

After the war the POW camp site served as a VA hospital from 1947 to 1951, then an Army Reserve facility.

The state-owned portion of Papago Park was sold to the city of Phoenix on February 25, 1959. The fish hatchery was also shut down in 1959, as it was considered obsolete by that time.

The City of Phoenix leased the hatchery grounds, including its man-made lakes, to the Arizona Zoological Society in 1962 to establish the Phoenix Zoo. A small stone cottage, used as the hatchery caretaker's residence, was retained as part of the zoo, and extensively renovated in the 1990s.

A portion of the Tempe park was conveyed to that city in 1935, and a parcel within that portion was conveyed to the Salt River Project in 1955. An 18-hole championship golf course was built by the city of Phoenix and completed in 1963.

The park was also the Finish Line in the fourth season of The Amazing Race.

== Hunt's Tomb ==
Hunt's Tomb is a small white pyramid behind a fence at the top of a hill within Papago Park. George W. P. Hunt (Arizona's 1st governor) had the tomb built in 1931 to entomb his wife. He was placed there after his death in 1934. Their daughter and his wife's family are also buried there.

== Papago Ponds ==
The Ponds have a surface area of 6 acres (2.4 ha) with an average depth of 8 ft (2.4 m), the elevation of the area is 1,100 ft (340 m).

=== Fish species ===
- Rainbow trout
- Largemouth bass
- Sunfish
- Channel catfish
- Tilapia
- Carp

=== Other species living at Papago Ponds ===
- Woodhouse's toad
- Mexican free-tailed bat
- Red-eared slider turtle

== Incidents ==
In February 2021, Joel Brotherton was fatally injured when he fell 30–40 feet while hiking Papago Park's Hole-in-the-Wall trail. In May 2021, two bodies were found in the park on the same day, one a victim of a homicide and another a victim of drowning.

In November 2024, a Phoenix police began a homicide investigation after a dead body was found in the park.

== See also ==
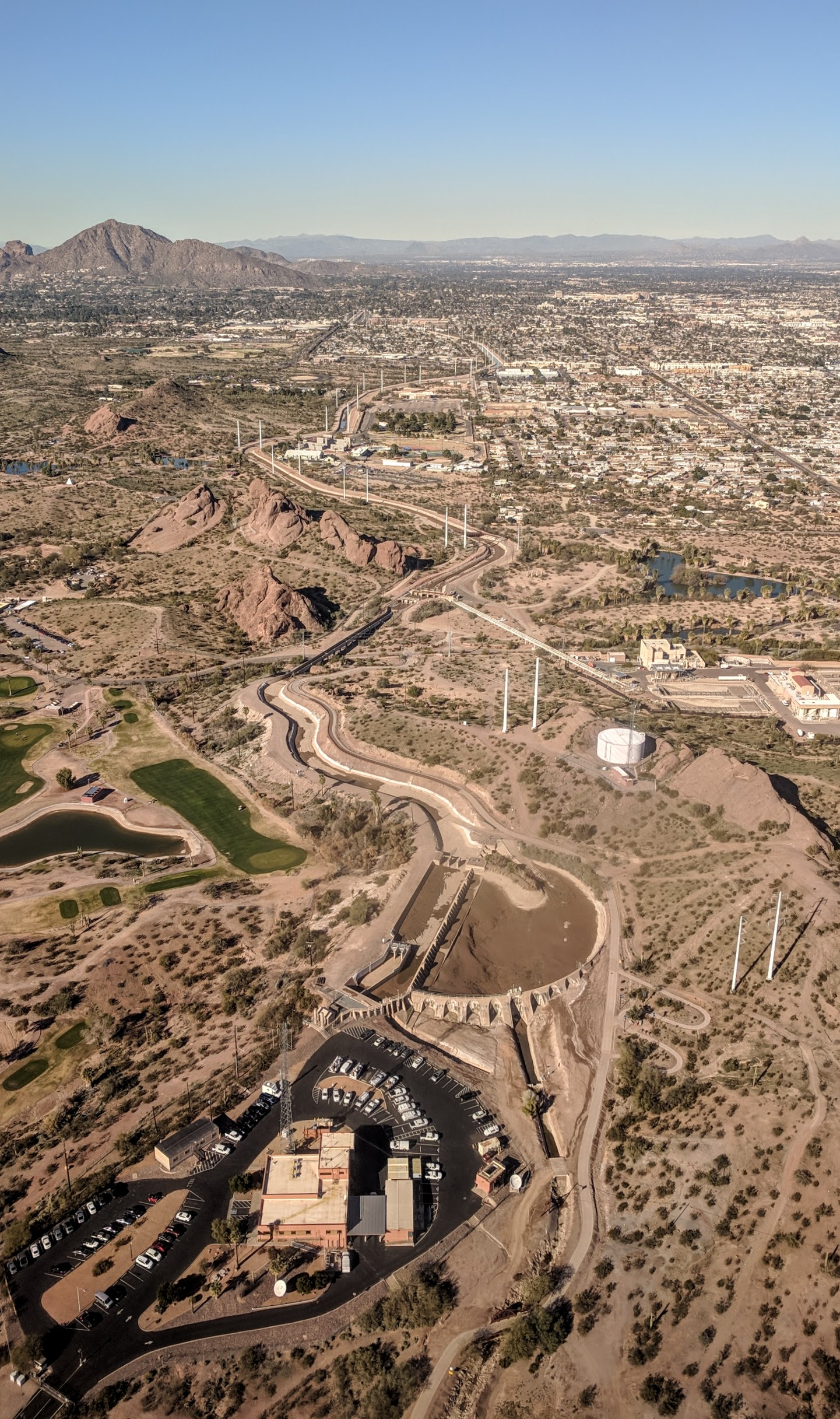
The Cross Cut Canal dam and forebay are within Papago Park, by the Crosscut Canal Multi-use Path.

- Phoenix Historic Property Register
- Camp Papago Park
