= August Maus =

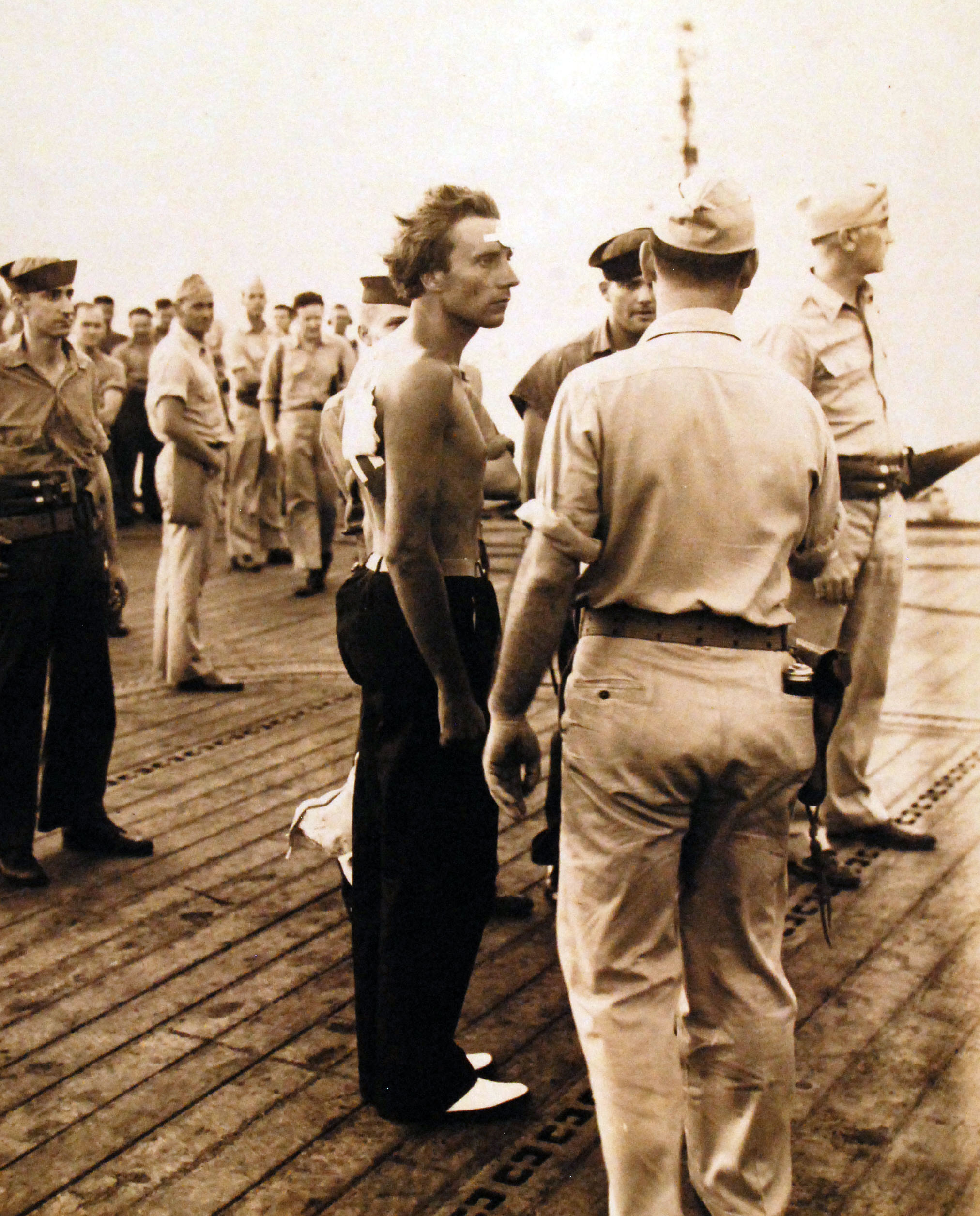
- August Maus as POW on board USS Core, 24 August 1943.
- Born: 7 February 1915; Wuppertal, German Empire
- Died: 28 September 1996 (aged 81); Hamburg, Germany
- Military career
- Allegiance: Nazi Germany
- Branch: Kriegsmarine
- Rank: Kapitänleutnant
- Units: Gorch Fock; Emden; U-68
- Commands: U-185
- Conflicts: World War II: Battle of the Atlantic; Great Papago Escape
- Awards: Knight's Cross of the Iron Cross

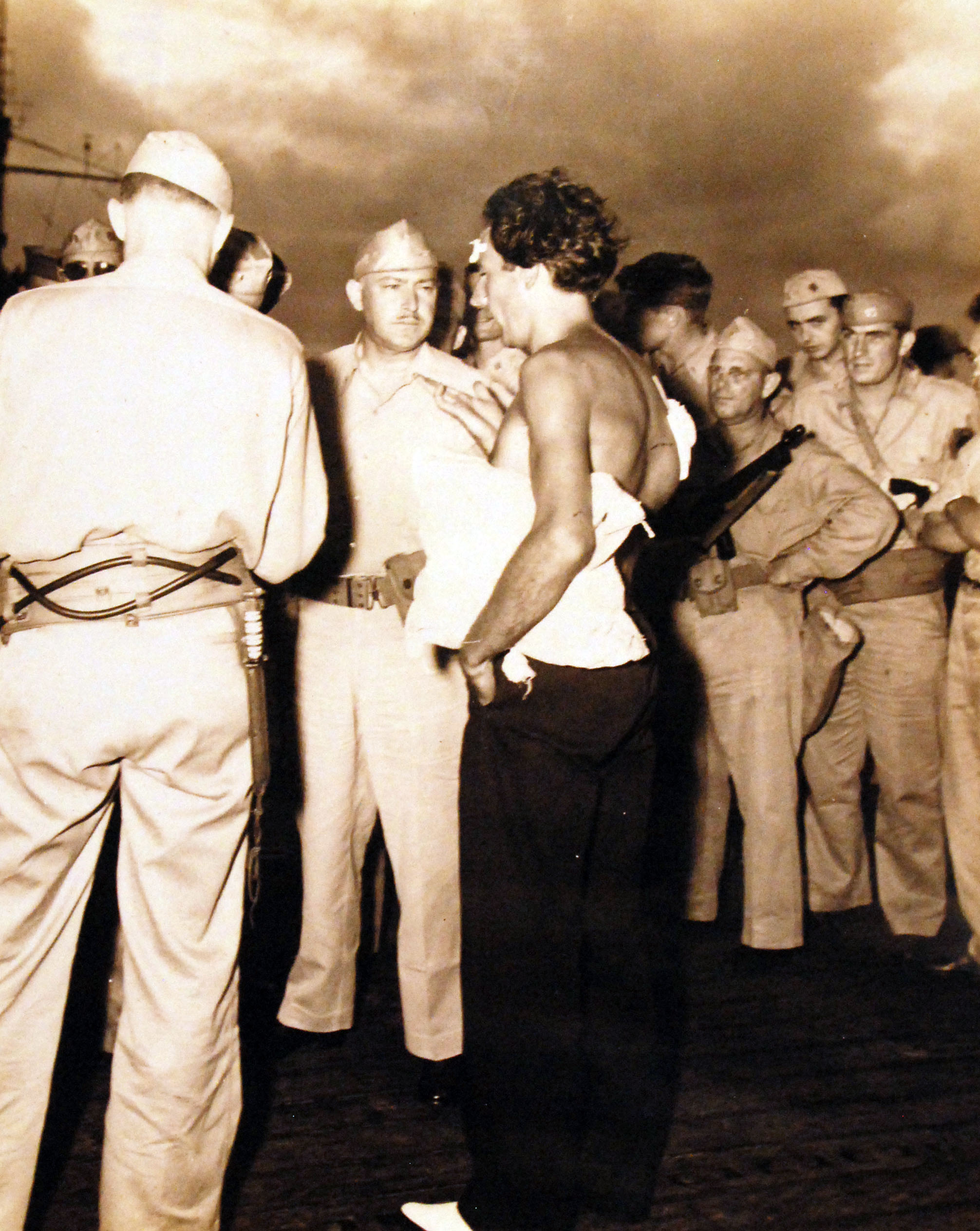
August Maus being questioned by Captain M.R. Greer on board USS Core, 24 August 1943

U-185 sunk on 24 August 1943

August Maus (7 February 1915 – 28 September 1996) was a German U-boat commander in World War II and recipient of the Knight's Cross of the Iron Cross of Nazi Germany. Prior to taking command of U-185, he served as an officer on U-68 under the command of Captain Karl-Friedrich Merten. Maus was taken prisoner after the sinking of U-185 and in 1944 participated in an escape attempt from the prisoner-of-war camp Papago Park in the United States.

== Biography ==
August Maus joined the German Navy (Reichsmarine, after 1 June 1935 Kriegsmarine) on 8 April 1934 at the age of 19 as officer aspirant and was sent to Stralsund to do his basic training. Then he was assigned to the training ship Gorch Fock. On 26 September 1934, he was appointed Seekadett, and one day later, he was assigned to the light cruiser Emden. On 27 June 1935 he started his training at Marineschule Mürwik and completed his infantry training on 29 July 1936. In August 1936 he was transferred to the light cruiser Nürnberg, on which he sailed to take part in the non-intervention patrols during the Spanish Civil War without encountering any belligerent forces.

On 1 January 1937 he was appointed Oberfähnrich zur See. After returning to Germany in February 1937, Maus took several technical courses. On 1 April 1937 he was promoted to Leutnant zur See and returned to the cruiser Nürnberg, where he served as adjutant from 3 March 1939 to 14 June 1939 and was promoted to Oberleutnant zur See on 1 April 1939. He was transferred to the battleship Schleswig-Holstein on 15 June 1939 and was present on the attacking battleship at the Battle of Westerplatte at the beginning of World War II. On 29 April 1940 he was transferred to the U-Boot-Waffe, and on 22 December 1940 he was assigned to U-68, serving under the command of Karl-Friedrich Merten and participating in two missions of the U-boat. On 1 November 1941 he was promoted to Kapitänleutnant and assigned to the 24th U-boat Flotilla. After completing a training for U-boat commanders beginning on 20 April 1942 he was assigned to U-185 on 5 May 1942 and became her commander on 12 June 1942.

As the commander of U-185, Maus led three missions in the Atlantic Ocean, where he managed to sink 9 ships with 62,761 GRT, killing altogether 172 men, damaging one ship with 6,840 GRT and shooting down two Allied aircraft.

On 11 August 1943 the German submarine U-604 was attacked and heavily damaged by a US Navy Lockheed Ventura aircraft flown by Thomas D. Davies. U-604 was prepared for scuttling and its commander, Horst Höltring, called for help. U-185 under the command of August Maus and U-172 under the command of Carl Emmermann were the only two surviving German submarines in the area. On 11 August 1943 they met with U-604 to rescue her crew. U-172 took 22 of them, whereas 25 went with Maus's U-185, including commander Höltring. During the rescue and scuttling action, a US Consolidated B-24 Liberator bomber attacked, killing one member of U-172's crew. Emmermann's U-172 submerged, whereas Maus of U-185 ordered to open fire on the aircraft, which was shot down, killing ten men. However, on 24 August 1943, U-185 was detected and attacked by a Grumman F4F Wildcat and a Grumman TBF Avenger from the escort carrier USS Core. One officer was shot dead by the Wildcat, and U-185 was heavily damaged by the depth charges from the Avenger, so sea water streamed into the submarine and chlorine gas developed, killing many of the crew. Höltring killed two badly wounded men who had asked for it, and then himself. August Maus gave the order to abandon ship and scuttle. 36 men from U-185 and U-604 were rescued by the destroyer USS Barker, but four of them died from their wounds shortly after. Altogether, 32 survivors – 23 from U-185 and 9 from U-604 – were taken prisoner and transferred to USS Core, among them August Maus. Later, Maus and his men were interrogated. On 21 September 1943, Maus was awarded the Knight's Cross of the Iron Cross for his successful raids, but it is unknown whether the Oberkommando der Marine (High Command of the German Navy) knew about the loss of U-185 at the time.

Maus was interned in Crossville, Tennessee, and was transferred to Camp Papago Park in Arizona on 27 January 1944. Shortly after, on 12 February 1944, he managed to escape together with four other former U-boat commanders, but he was recaptured in Tucson together with the former commander of U-513, Friedrich Guggenberger. Maus helped his companions to dig a tunnel in the so-called Great Papago Escape. In the evening of 23 December 1944, 25 prisoners escaped through the tunnel, but August Maus could not take part because he was injured. Within the next two weeks, they were all recaptured, including Friedrich Guggenberger and Hans-Werner Kraus.

In 1946, Maus was released from captivity. After the war, he lived as a businessman in Hamburg.

== Awards ==
- Wehrmacht Long Service Award 4th Class (1 April 1938)
- Spanish Cross (5 June 1940)
- Iron Cross (1939)
  - 2nd Class (6 October 1939)
  - 1st Class (5 May 1943)
- High Seas Fleet Badge (9 November 1942)
- U-boat War Badge (1939) (26 December 1942)
- Knight's Cross of the Iron Cross on 21 September 1943 as Kapitänleutnant and commander of U-185
