= Friedrich Guggenberger =

German U-boat commander during World War II

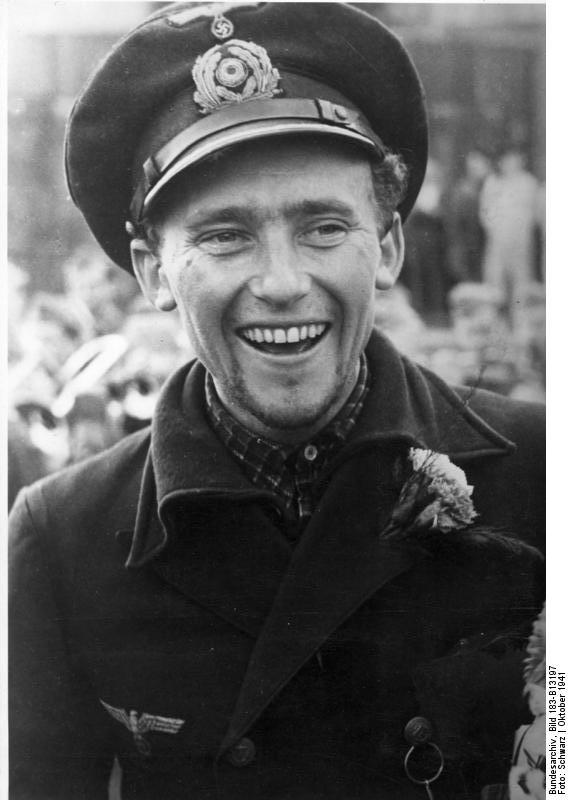
- Born: 6 March 1915; Munich, Kingdom of Bavaria, German Empire
- Died: 13 May 1988 (aged 73); Erlenbach am Main, West Germany
- Military career
- Allegiance: Nazi Germany; West Germany
- Branch: Kriegsmarine; German Navy
- Service years: 1934–1945 (Kriegsmarine); 1956–1972 (Bundesmarine)
- Rank: Konteradmiral
- Commands: U-28; U-81; U-847; U-513
- Conflicts: World War II: Battle of the Atlantic; Great Papago Escape
- Awards: Knight's Cross of the Iron Cross with Oak Leaves

Friedrich Guggenberger (6 March 1915 – 13 May 1988) was a German admiral, who in his earlier career was a U-boat commander in the Second World War. From November 1940 until his capture in July 1943, he was credited with sinking 17 ships for a total of 66,848 gross register tons (GRT) and damaging another for 6,003 GRT. He sank the British aircraft carrier HMS Ark Royal in November 1941. For these achievements he received the Knight's Cross of the Iron Cross with Oak Leaves of Nazi Germany. After the war he became the Deputy Chief of Staff in the NATO command Allied Forces Northern Europe.

== Early life ==
Guggenberger was born in Munich on 6 March 1915. He had entered the navy by 1934, transferring to the U-boat arm in October 1939, shortly after the outbreak of the Second World War. After the usual training pattern he was assigned to U-28, where he served under the command of Knight's Cross holder Günther Kuhnke. Guggenberger then briefly took over from Kuhnke and commanded U-28 for a few months whilst she was part of a school flotilla. He was awarded the Iron Cross 2nd Class on 23 March 1940.

== U-81 ==
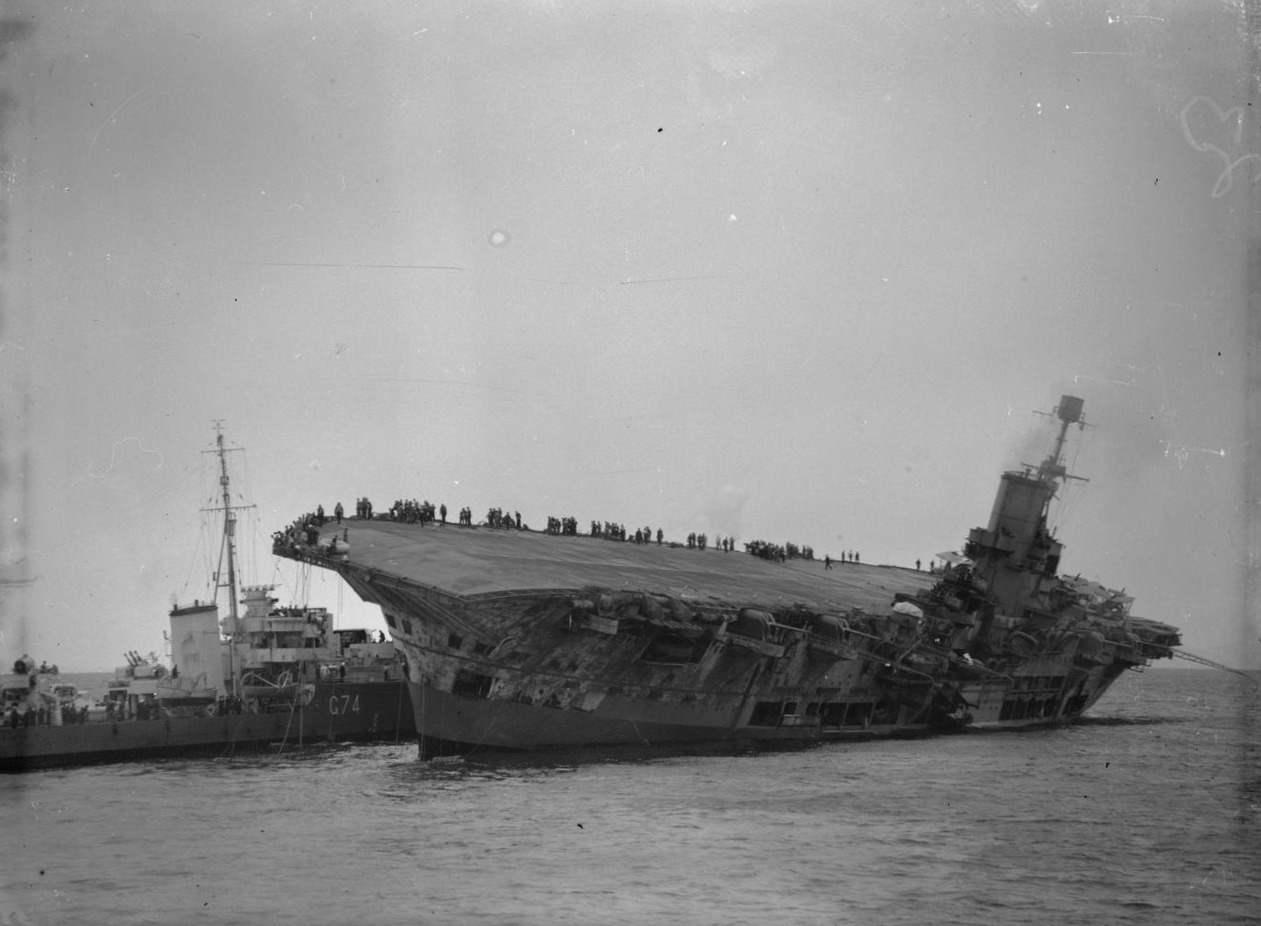
HMS Legion moves alongside the damaged and listing HMS Ark Royal in order to take off survivors

Guggenberger then received command of U-81, commissioning her on 26 April 1941. He carried out three patrols in the Atlantic, encountering moderate success and sinking two ships. He was awarded the U-boat War Badge 1939 on 8 July and promoted to Kapitänleutnant on 1 September.

He was then ordered to take U-81 into the Mediterranean to join 29th U-boat Flotilla. His first attempt failed when, attempting to force the Straits of Gibraltar, U-81 was spotted by RAF planes and attacked, causing heavy damage. U-81 retreated to Brest where she was repaired. Guggenberger was awarded the Iron Cross 1st Class on 9 September. He put to sea that afternoon and sank the Empire Springbuck at 5,591 tons. The following day he sank Sally Mærsk for a further 3,252 gross registered tons.

U-81 sailed again to attempt to enter the Mediterranean in November 1941. Whilst transiting the Straits on 13 November, he met the ships of Force H, returning to Gibraltar. He was able to attack the aircraft carrier HMS Ark Royal, hitting her amidships with a single torpedo. The carrier was hunting U-205, which had carried out an unsuccessful attack on her. Ark Royal had been turning into wind to launch aircraft when Guggenberger struck.

He then escaped the depth charge attacks of the escorting destroyers. Despite attempts to salvage Ark Royal, she had to be abandoned, and she sank the next day. Guggenberger was awarded the Knight's Cross. The award was fortuitous. Guggenberger was sure he had hit a battleship—Malaya— and was shocked when the BdU announced the sinking of the carrier for he had missed his intended target. Only one man was killed aboard the carrier by the initial impact. The remainder were taken off.

Guggenberger achieved modest success in the Battle of the Mediterranean. The FFL Vikings P 41, a French ship of 1,150 grt was sunk on 16 April 1942, as was the British Caspia to increase the haul by 6,018 grt. A number of Egyptian sailing ships followed. The same day Bab el Farag, 105 grt and Fatouh el Kher, 97 grt, were sunk by gunfire southwest of Haifa. The 90-ton Hefz el Rahman followed on 19 April. On 22 April El Saadiah, 122 grt, and Aziza were sunk.

== U-513 and capture ==
Guggenberger went on to have a number of successful patrols in the Mediterranean, and left U-81 on 24 December 1942, being replaced by Johann-Otto Krieg. Guggenberger was awarded the Oak Leaves to his Knight's Cross on 8 January and oversaw the commissioning of U-847, but did not take her on any war patrols. The presentation was made on 31 January 1943 at the Wolf's Lair, Hitler's headquarters in Rastenburg, for the Oak Leaves presentation. After the presentation, Hitler met with Dönitz and Vizeadmiral Theodor Krancke in private. In this meeting, Hitler appointed Dönitz as Oberbefehlshaber der Marine (Commander-in-Chief) of the Kriegsmarine after Raeder's resignation on 30 January 1943. On the return flight to Berlin, Dönitz informed Guggenberger and the other officers present of this change in command.

He then joined Admiral Karl Dönitz's staff for three months. He returned to sea in May 1943 in command of U-513, with which he undertook one patrol. After sinking four ships and damaging a fifth, an American PBM Mariner depth charged and sank her off the coast of Brazil on 19 July 1943. Guggenberger was one of seven survivors. Badly wounded, he and the others spent a day aboard a life raft before being picked up by an American ship, USS Barnegat. Guggenberger was operated on and hospitalised before being transferred to Fort Hunt on 25 September 1943, then the Prisoner of war camp at Crossville later that month. By late January 1944 Guggenberger had been moved to the Papago Park camp near Phoenix, Arizona.

== Escapes ==
Guggenberger met with four other U-boat commanders and on 12 February 1944 they escaped from the camp. Guggenberger travelled with August Maus, but they were recaptured in Tucson, Arizona. Guggenberger was part of the Great Papago Escape, a larger breakout of 25 POWs on the night of 23–24 December 1944. This time he travelled with Jürgen Quaet-Faslem and managed to make it to within 16 km (10 miles) of the Mexican border before they were recaptured on 6 January 1945. After these escapades, Guggenberger was transferred to Camp Shanks, New York in February, 1946, and was then repatriated to occupied Germany. He was held in a compound in the British zone, near Münster, before being released in August 1946.

== Postwar and personal life ==
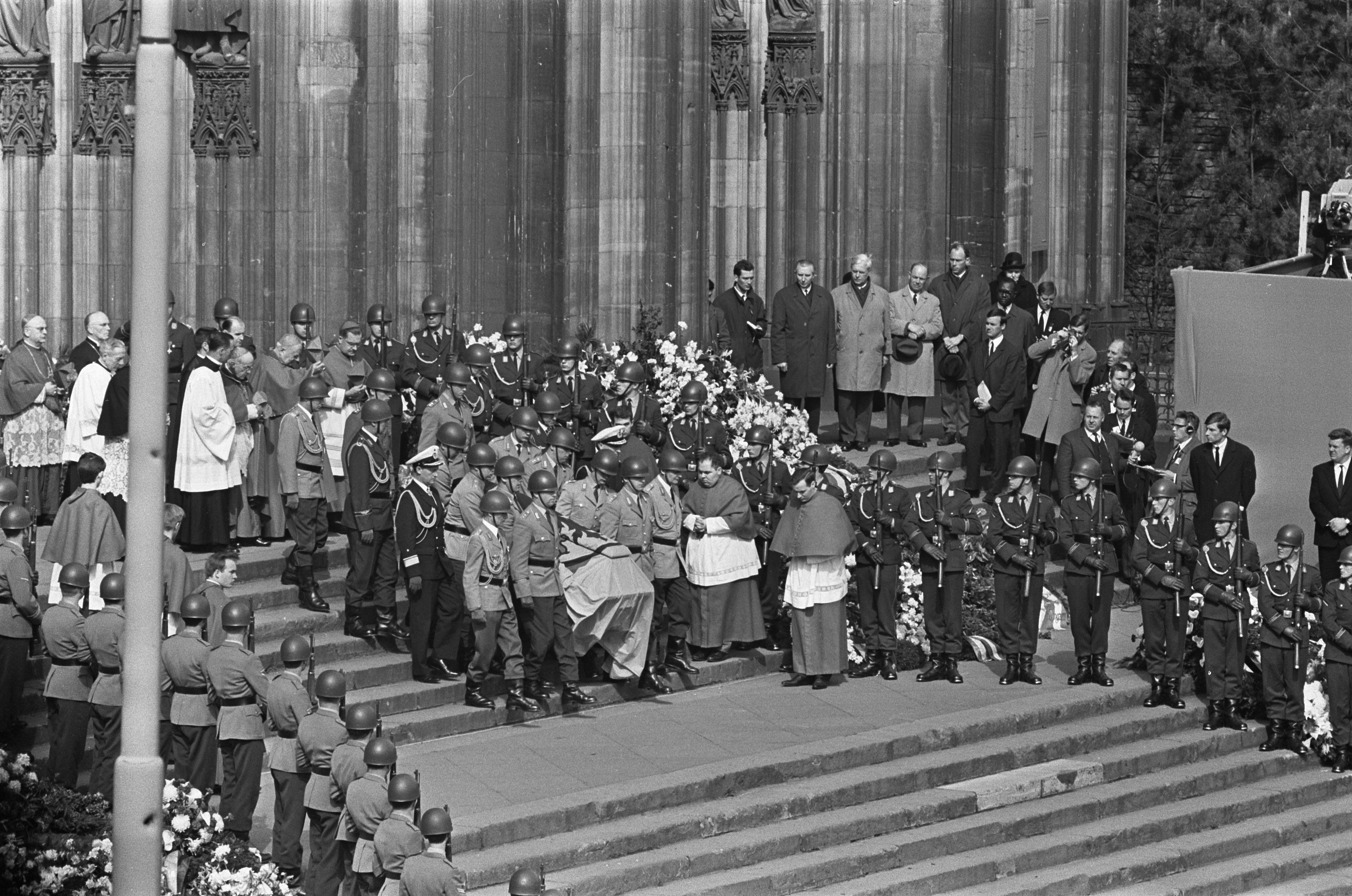
Flottillenadmiral Guggenberger (wearing a white cap, 2nd person on the right of the coffin) at Adenauer's funeral.

On 16 November 1940 Guggenberger married Lieselotte Fischer. The marriage produced four children. Guggenberger became an architect, before rejoining the navy, by now the Bundesmarine in 1956. From 5 August 1958 to 25 June 1959, he studied at the Naval War College in Newport, Rhode Island, and rose to the rank of Konteradmiral. When Konrad Adenauer, the former Chancellor of Germany, died on 19 April 1967, Guggenberger was chosen for the military honor guard on 25 April.

He became the Deputy Chief of Staff in the NATO command AFNORTH, and served there for four years. He retired in October 1972. In his last years, Guggenberger suffered from Alzheimer's disease. On 13 May 1988 he left his home for a stroll in the forest and never returned. His body was found two years later.

== Awards ==
- Iron Cross (1939)
  - 2nd Class (23 March 1940)
  - 1st Class (19 September 1940)
- U-boat War Badge (8 July 1940)
- Medaglia d'Argento al Valor Militare (10 March 1942)
- Medaglia di Bronzo al Valore Militare (29 May 1943)
- Knight's Cross of the Iron Cross with Oak Leaves
  - Knight's Cross on 10 December 1941 as Kapitänleutnant and commander of U-81
  - 171st Oak Leaves on 8 January 1943 as Kapitänleutnant and commander of U-81
