= Jürgen Wattenberg =

German u-boat commander

- Born: 28 December 1900; Lübeck, German Empire
- Died: 27 September 1995 (aged 94); Germany
- Military career
- Allegiance: Nazi Germany
- Branch: Kriegsmarine
- Rank: Kapitän zur See
- Commands: U-162, 9 September 1941 – 3 September 1942
- Conflicts: World War II: Battle of the Atlantic; Battle of the River Plate; Great Papago Escape

Jürgen Wattenberg (28 December 1900 – 27 September 1995) was a German naval officer and U-boat commander during the Second World War. In a successful career spanning just under a year, he sank 14 ships, a total of 82,027 gross register tons (GRT).

Wattenberg had an eventful war, serving initially aboard the pocket battleship Admiral Graf Spee during the Battle of the River Plate and up until her scuttling off Montevideo. He was interned in Uruguay but escaped and made his way back to Germany where he joined the U-boat service. He was the first and only commander of U-162, which he commanded for three war patrols, becoming one of the oldest U-boat commanders of the entire war. He achieved several successes before his U-boat was attacked and sunk by British warships.

Taken prisoner once more, Wattenberg was imprisoned in the United States, where he contrived to escape again, spending over a month at large. He was released after the end of the war and settled in Germany, where he died in 1995, aged 94.

== Early life ==
Wattenberg was born in Lübeck on 28 December 1900. He joined the German Navy, attaining the rank of Fähnrich zur See on 1 April 1923. He was then promoted to Leutnant zur See and Oberleutnant zur See on 1 October 1925 and 1 July 1927 respectively. He was promoted to Kapitänleutnant on 1 October 1938 and by the outbreak of war was serving aboard the pocket battleship Admiral Graf Spee. The Graf Spee was scuttled off Montevideo, Uruguay, in December 1939 by her commanding officer, Kapitän zur See Hans Langsdorff. Wattenberg was interned with the rest of her crew but he escaped and made his way back to Germany, where he arrived in May 1940.

He joined the U-boat force in October that year and received command of U-162 on 9 September 1941, departing on his first cruise on 7 February 1942. Wattenberg was by this time 41 years old, making him one of the oldest U-boat commanders to undertake a combat patrol.

== Command of U-162 ==
Wattenberg was particularly successful in his time as commander of U-162. On his first patrol, from 7 February to 18 March 1942, he ranged through the North Sea and into the Atlantic Ocean, his boat sank a single vessel, the 4,365 ton British White Crest on 24 February. His second patrol lasted from 7 April until 8 June 1942, during which time U-162 preyed on shipping in the Caribbean and off the South American coast. By the time of his return to Lorient he had spent 63 days at sea and sank a further nine ships, a total tonnage of 47,181 GRT. His third and last patrol began with his departure from Lorient on 7 July 1942 and covered the same area as his second. He sank four ships off the coast of South America during August, a total of 30,481 GRT; his last victim being the American Star of Oregon on 30 August.

U-162 was detected in mid-Atlantic north-east of Trinidad on 3 September 1942 and attacked by three British destroyers, HMS Vimy, HMS Pathfinder and HMS Quentin, and sunk with depth charges. Two of the crew were killed; Wattenberg and 48 other survivors were rescued and became prisoners of war.

== Captivity and later life ==
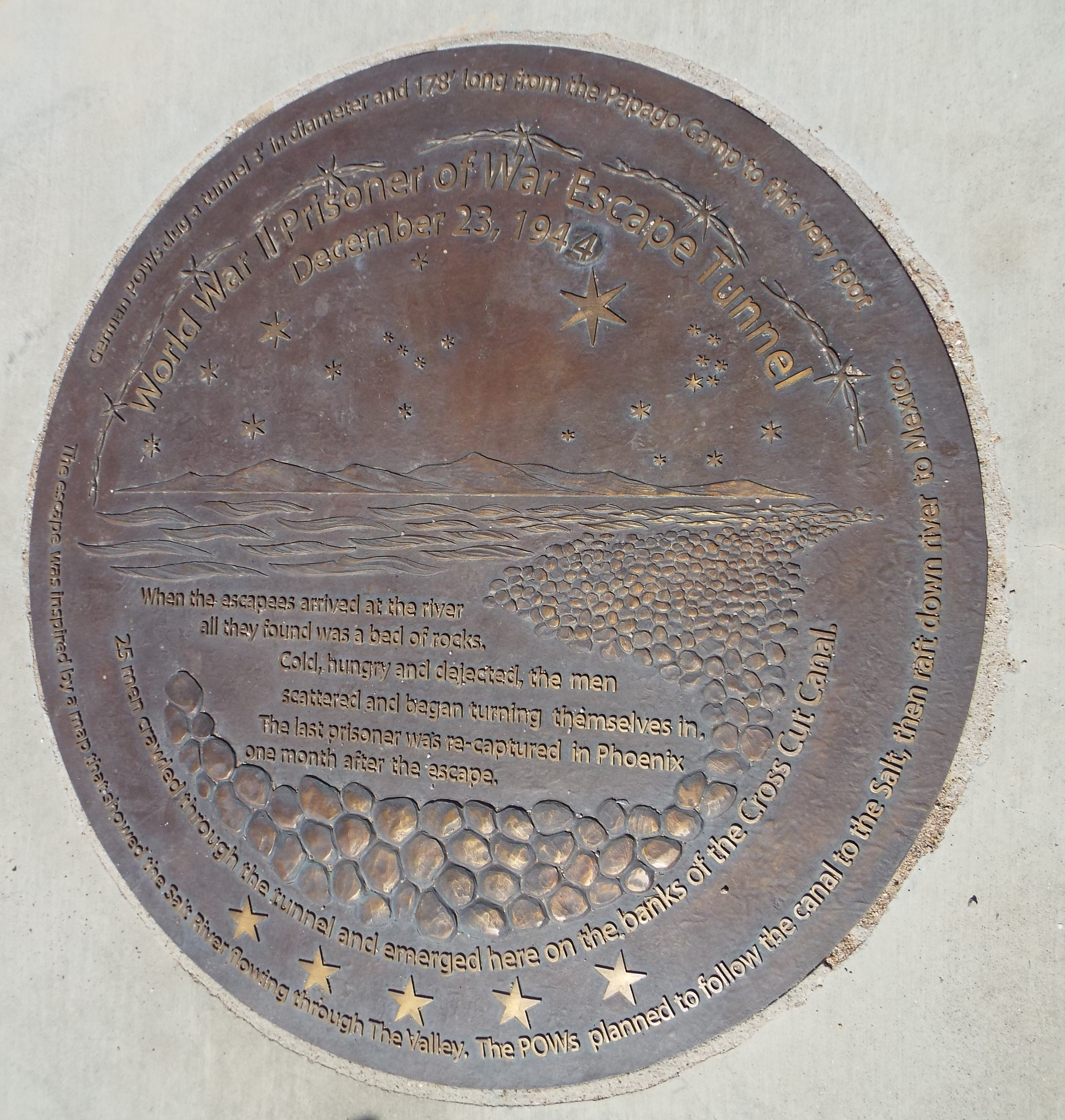
Papago Escape Tunnel exit marker

Wattenberg was imprisoned in several camps in the United States, starting at Fort Hunt, where he arrived in September 1942. He was then moved to Crossville on 16 October 1942, and again to Camp Papago Park on 27 January 1944. A large break-out occurred on the night of 23–24 December 1944 - the Great Papago Escape - with Wattenberg being one of the 25 escapees. Most were recaptured or surrendered fairly quickly; Wattenberg managed to remain at large until 28 January, the last of the escapees to be recaptured. He had been promoted to Kapitän zur See on 1 April 1943, during his time as a prisoner. With the end of the war Wattenberg was transferred first to Camp Shanks in 1946, then to a compound near Münster before being released.

In later life he became manager of the Lübeck branch of the Bavaria – St. Pauli Brewery. Jürgen Wattenberg died on 27 September 1995, aged 94.

== Bibliography ==
- Busch, Rainer; Röll, Hans-Joachim (1999b). German U-boat commanders of World War II : a biographical dictionary. Translated by Brooks, Geoffrey. London, Annapolis, Md: Greenhill Books, Naval Institute Press. ISBN 1-55750-186-6.
