= Hunt's Tomb =

Tomb of former governor of Arizona, United States

- U.S. National Register of Historic Places
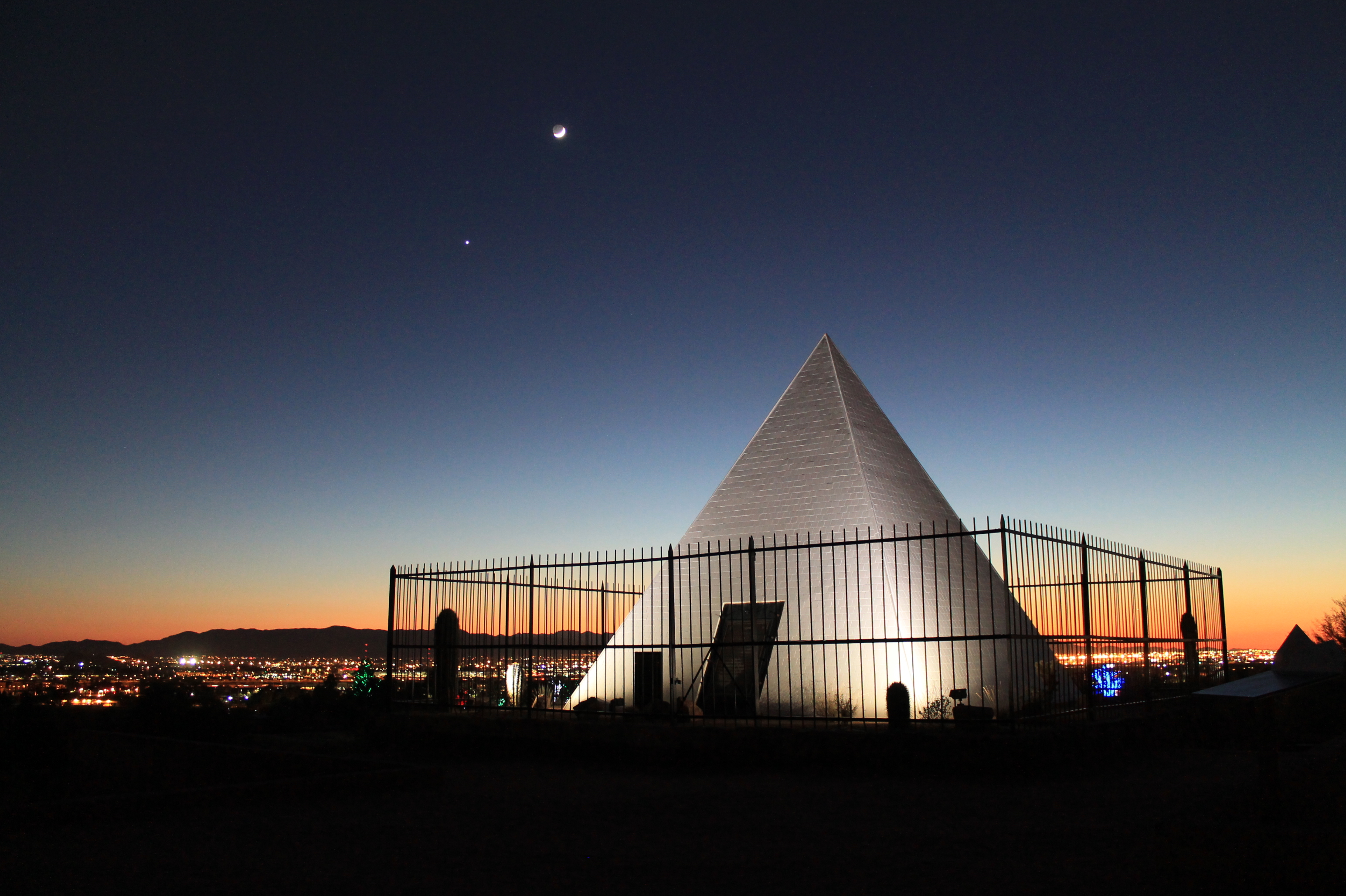
- Hunt's Tomb overlooking Phoenix

- Location within Arizona Location within the United States
- Location: 625 N. Galvin Pkwy, Phoenix, Arizona
- Coordinates: 33°27′6.8″N 111°56′39.7″W
- Area: less than one acre
- Built: 1932
- Built by: Webb, Del E.
- MPS: Pyramidal Monuments in Arizona MPS
- NRHP reference No.: 08000526
- Added to NRHP: June 12, 2008

Hunt's Tomb is a tomb in the shape of a small white pyramid behind a fence at the top of a hill within Papago Park, Phoenix, Arizona, United States. George W. P. Hunt (Arizona's first governor) had the tomb built in 1931 to entomb his wife. He was placed there after his death in 1934. Their daughter and his wife's family are also buried there.

The tomb was listed on the National Register of Historic Places in 2008.

The tomb is easily seen from anywhere in the southwest part of Papago Park on a sizable hill overlooking the Phoenix Zoo and offers a panoramic view of the eastern part of the Valley of the Sun.

According to Roadside America, "Dubbed 'King George VII,' he was a friend of the common man and a foe (sometimes) of the railroad and mining trusts, which he called 'coyotes' and 'skunks.'" Plaques on his pyramid declare that he was a descendant of an unnamed "Revolutionary War patriot," that he allowed women to vote in his state eight years before the rest of the country, and that he was elected governor seven times, which "set a national record."
