= Herbert Kuppisch =

German naval officer

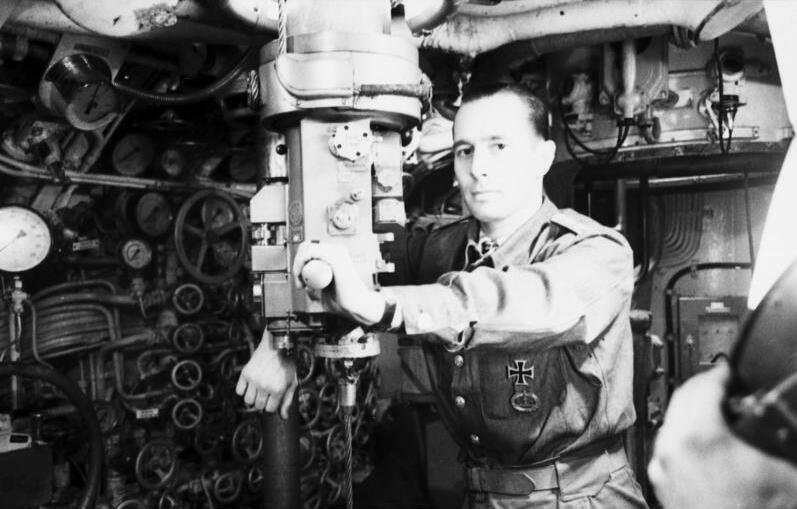
- Born: 10 December 1909
- Died: 27 August 1943 (aged 33); U-847, Sargasso Sea, off El Hierro, Azores; 28°19′N 37°58′W
- Military career
- Allegiance: Nazi Germany
- Branch: Kriegsmarine
- Rank: Kapitänleutnant
- Commands: U-58; U-94; U-516; U-847
- Conflicts: Battle of the Atlantic
- Awards: Knight's Cross of the Iron Cross

Herbert Kuppisch (10 December 1909 – 27 August 1943) was a German naval officer during World War II and commander of U-58, U-94, U-516, and U-847. He was a recipient of the Knight's Cross of the Iron Cross. Kuppisch and the crew of U-847 were killed by aircraft from the US escort carrier USS Card on 27 August 1943.

== Awards ==
- Wehrmacht Long Service Award 4th Class (4 October 1937)
- Sudetenland Medal (20 December 1939)
- Iron Cross (1939) 2nd Class (5 December 1939) & 1st Class (4 May 1940)
- U-boat War Badge (4 May 1940)
- Knight's Cross of the Iron Cross on 14 May 1941 as Kapitänleutnant and commander of U-94
