= German submarine U-847 =

German World War II submarine

History

Nazi Germany
- Name: U-847
- Ordered: 20 January 1941
- Builder: DeSchiMAG AG Weser, Bremen
- Yard number: 1053
- Laid down: 23 November 1941
- Launched: 5 September 1942
- Commissioned: 23 January 1943
- Fate: Sunk on 27 August 1943 at position 28°19′N 37°58′W by air-launched homing torpedoes fired from US aircraft operating off escort carrier USS Card.

General characteristics
- Class & type: Type IXD2 submarine
- Displacement: 1,610 t (1,580 long tons) surfaced; 1,804 t (1,776 long tons) submerged
- Length: 87.58 m (287 ft 4 in) o/a; 68.50 m (224 ft 9 in) pressure hull
- Beam: 7.50 m (24 ft 7 in) o/a; 4.40 m (14 ft 5 in) pressure hull
- Height: 10.20 m (33 ft 6 in)
- Draught: 5.35 m (17 ft 7 in)
- Installed power: 9,000 PS (6,620 kW; 8,880 bhp) (diesels); 1,000 PS (740 kW; 990 shp) (electric)
- Propulsion: 2 shafts; 2 × diesel engines; 2 × electric motors
- Speed: 20.8 knots (38.5 km/h; 23.9 mph) surfaced; 6.9 knots (12.8 km/h; 7.9 mph) submerged
- Range: 12,750 nmi (23,610 km; 14,670 mi) at 10 knots (19 km/h; 12 mph) surfaced; 115 nmi (213 km; 132 mi) at 4 knots (7.4 km/h; 4.6 mph) submerged
- Test depth: 230 m (750 ft)
- Complement: 55 to 64
- Armament: 6 × torpedo tubes (four bow, two stern); 24 × 53.3 cm (21 in) torpedoes; 1 × 10.5 cm (4.1 in) SK C/32 deck gun (150 rounds); 1 × 3.7 cm (1.5 in) SK C/30; 2 × 2 cm (0.79 in) C/30 anti-aircraft guns

Service record
- Part of: 4th U-boat Flotilla; 23 January – 30 June 1943; 12th U-boat Flotilla; 1 July – 27 August 1943
- Identification codes: M 49 998
- Commanders: Kptlt. Friedrich Guggenberger; 23 January – 1 February 1943; K.Kapt. Wilhelm Rollmann; 26 January 1943; Kptlt. Jost Metzler; 1 February – 30 June 1943; Kptlt. Herbert Kuppisch; 1 July – 27 August 1943
- Operations: 1 patrol: 29 July – 27 August 1943
- Victories: None

German submarine U-847 was a long-range Type IXD2 U-boat built for Nazi Germany's Kriegsmarine during World War II. Laid down in Bremen and launched on 5 September 1942.

== Design ==
German Type IXD2 submarines were considerably larger than the original Type IXs. U-847 had a displacement of 1,610 tonnes (1,580 long tons) when at the surface and 1,799 tonnes (1,771 long tons) while submerged. The U-boat had a total length of 87.58 m (287 ft 4 in), a pressure hull length of 68.50 m (224 ft 9 in), a beam of 7.50 m (24 ft 7 in), a height of 10.20 m (33 ft 6 in), and a draught of 5.35 m (17 ft 7 in). The submarine was powered by two MAN M 9 V 40/46 supercharged four-stroke, nine-cylinder diesel engines plus two MWM RS34.5S six-cylinder four-stroke diesel engines for cruising, producing a total of 9,000 metric horsepower (6,620 kW; 8,880 shp) for use while surfaced, two Siemens-Schuckert 2 GU 345/34 double-acting electric motors producing a total of 1,000 shaft horsepower (1,010 PS; 750 kW) for use while submerged. She had two shafts and two 1.85 m (6 ft) propellers. The boat was capable of operating at depths of up to 200 metres (660 ft).

The submarine had a maximum surface speed of 20.8 knots (38.5 km/h; 23.9 mph) and a maximum submerged speed of 6.9 knots (12.8 km/h; 7.9 mph). When submerged, the boat could operate for 121 nautical miles (224 km; 139 mi) at 2 knots (3.7 km/h; 2.3 mph); when surfaced, she could travel 12,750 nautical miles (23,610 km; 14,670 mi) at 10 knots (19 km/h; 12 mph). U-847 was fitted with six 53.3 cm (21 in) torpedo tubes (four fitted at the bow and two at the stern), 24 torpedoes, one 10.5 cm (4.13 in) SK C/32 naval gun, 150 rounds, and a 3.7 cm (1.5 in) SK C/30 with 2575 rounds as well as two 2 cm (0.79 in) C/30 anti-aircraft guns with 8100 rounds. The boat had a complement of fifty-five.

== Service history ==
She was commanded for her short career by four Knight's Cross recipients, each a U-boat ace in their own right, although she neither sank nor damaged any vessels. They were:

- Kapitänleutnant Friedrich Guggenberger
- Korvettenkapitän Wilhelm Rollmann
- Kapitänleutnant Jost Metzler
- Kapitänleutnant Herbert Kuppisch

She joined 4th Flotilla for training on 23 January 1943, where she remained until 30 June 1943. She then joined 12th Flotilla for active service until 27 August 1943 when she was sunk while providing logistical support for other U-boats operating in the area.

== Fate ==
U-847 was sunk by air-launched FIDO torpedoes dropped from US Avenger and Wildcat aircraft operating from the escort carrier USS Card on 27 August 1943 in the Atlantic Ocean at position 28°19′N 37°58′W. All 63 hands were lost.

== Bibliography ==
- Busch, Rainer; Röll, Hans-Joachim (1999). German U-boat commanders of World War II : a biographical dictionary. Translated by Brooks, Geoffrey. London, Annapolis, Md: Greenhill Books, Naval Institute Press. ISBN 1-55750-186-6.
- Busch, Rainer; Röll, Hans-Joachim (1999). Der U-Boot-Krieg, 1939-1945: Deutsche U-Boot-Verluste von September 1939 bis Mai 1945 [German U-boat losses from September 1939 to May 1945] (in German). Vol. IV. Hamburg, Berlin, Bonn: Mittler. ISBN 3-8132-0514-2.
- Gröner, Eric; Jung, Dieter; Maass, Martin (1991). German Warships 1815-1945: U-boats and Mine Warfare Vessels. Vol. 2. Translated by Thomas, Keith; Magowan, Rachel. London: Conway Maritime Press. ISBN 0-85177-593-4.
- Sharpe, Peter (1998). U-Boat Fact File. Great Britain: Midland Publishing. ISBN 1-85780-072-9.
