= Camp Papago Park =

World War II POW facility in Arizona

Coordinates: 33°28′15″N 111°56′57″W

Camp Papago Park was a prisoner of war (POW) facility located in Papago Park in the eastern part of Phoenix, Arizona, United States. It consisted of five compounds, four for enlisted men and one for officers. The property now is divided between the Papago Park Military Reservation, belonging to the Arizona National Guard, a city park, residential neighborhoods and a car dealer's lot.

Called Schlaraffenland—the land of milk and honey—by its mostly U-boat-crew inmates, Camp Papago Park was very different from Axis POW camps, especially with regard to how prisoners were treated: Inmates were not required to work or study, though many chose to as a means of combating boredom (though mostly the latter, as there were only 700 volunteers for labor tasks). The camp had a theater where films were screened twice a week and the camp choir could practice. Much of this was discussed, along with anything else the prisoners who wrote The Papago Rundschau, the camp's newspaper, chose to include.

== Escape ==
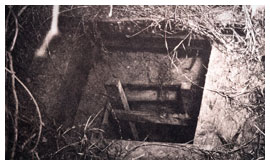
Entrance to the tunnel

In December 1944, twenty-five POWs escaped from Camp Papago Park into the surrounding desert, among them Kapitänleutnant Hans-Werner Kraus. Originally thought to be impossible to tunnel through, the hard clay of the surrounding area turned out to be conducive to tunneling as it softened greatly when wet. Over time, the escapees dug a tunnel 176 feet long, three feet high and half as wide, without being detected. Though the guards proved easy to get past, the vast distances and desert terrain were insurmountable, resulting in most returning to the camp within a few weeks. One escapee turned himself in on seeing the camp’s planned Christmas menu. Indeed, most of the escapees were aware that returning to Germany was nearly impossible and had “escaped” as more of a prank. This did not mean all had abandoned any hope of making it home, and a few of the men brought along boards they intended to fashion into a raft. This would then be used to float down the Salt River to the Gila River, which they had seen on local maps but not personally. Unfortunately for their plan, the river was not flowing at the time of their escape, and what they found was a dry arroyo instead.

When two escapees were recaptured, subsequent events further illustrated differences between Axis and Allied POW operations: The two men dined with a local customs official at his home. Later nearby residents came to see the escapees first-hand after their story appeared in the news, as did a handicapped boy looking for a game of chess.

They brought in this little crippled boy. He didn't know anyone who could play chess with him, and he wanted to know if we knew how to play. I told Reinhard, in German, to let the kid win, because I thought we might win favor with our captors. And this kid didn't look like he had long to live, so why not let him beat the great captured war prisoners? He could tell his friends about it later.

— Heinrich Palmer

== Death at Papago Park POW Camp ==
Writer Jane Eppinga published (in 2017) Death at Papago Park POW Camp, a book that covers the history of the camp, including the murder of Werner Max Herschel Drechsler and subsequent executions of seven men implicated in the crime.

Eppinga said she first stumbled on the topic about two decades ago. "I was reading a military book and saw that there was a footnote about an execution at Papago Park," she said. "The more I started looking, the more involved I became in it. It's such a strange story."

There was not much information to be found at first. Eppinga said she used a Freedom of Information Act request to access court-martial papers, which she finally found in the National Archives. "I went to Washington, D.C., and actually looked at the archives and folders and got copies of the court-martial," she said.

She also spoke to members of the military, such as Captain Jerry Mason, who provided photos for the book.

During the course of her research, Eppinga said she was most surprised to see how Drechsler — who had provided German secrets to U.S. Navy authorities — was handled when he arrived to the camp. "Why the Americans didn’t take better care of him is what is amazing to me... They knew that he would be recognized by his compatriots in Papago Park. He only lived about seven hours once he got to Papago Park."

Seven decades later, Eppinga said she finds that the topic of what happened at Papago Park still brings mixed reactions. "There’s still feelings, if you bring it up, of what was wrong or right in the case."

== See also ==
- Arizona during World War II
- List of POW camps in the United States
- German Prisoners of War in the United States
