= Buckeye/Central Avenue station =

Light rail station in Phoenix, Arizona

Buckeye/Central Ave

General information
- Other names: Central Park; Central City South
- Location: Buckeye Road and Central Avenue; Phoenix, Arizona; United States
- Coordinates: 33.418207°N 112.073523°W
- Owner: Valley Metro
- Operator: Valley Metro Rail & Streetcar
- Platforms: 1 island platform
- Tracks: 2
- Connections: Valley Metro Bus: 0, 13

Construction
- Structure type: At-grade
- Accessible: Yes

History
- Opened: June 7, 2025

Services
Preceding station	Valley Metro	Following station
Lincoln/Central Avenue toward Metro Parkway	B Line	Pioneer/Central Avenue toward Baseline/Central Avenue
Lincoln/1st Avenue One-way operation	B Line	Pioneer/Central Avenue toward Baseline/Central Avenue
Location

Buckeye/Central Avenue station, also known as Central Park and Central City South, is a light rail station on the B Line of the Valley Metro Rail & Streetcar system in Phoenix. Built as part of the South Central Extension it is located on Central Avenue near the intersection of Buckeye Road. The station opened on June 7, 2025.

== Notable places nearby ==
- Central Park
- Harmon Park
- Lowell Elementary School
- St. Anthony Catholic Parish
