= Encanto/Central Avenue station =

Light rail station in Phoenix, Arizona

Encanto/Central Ave
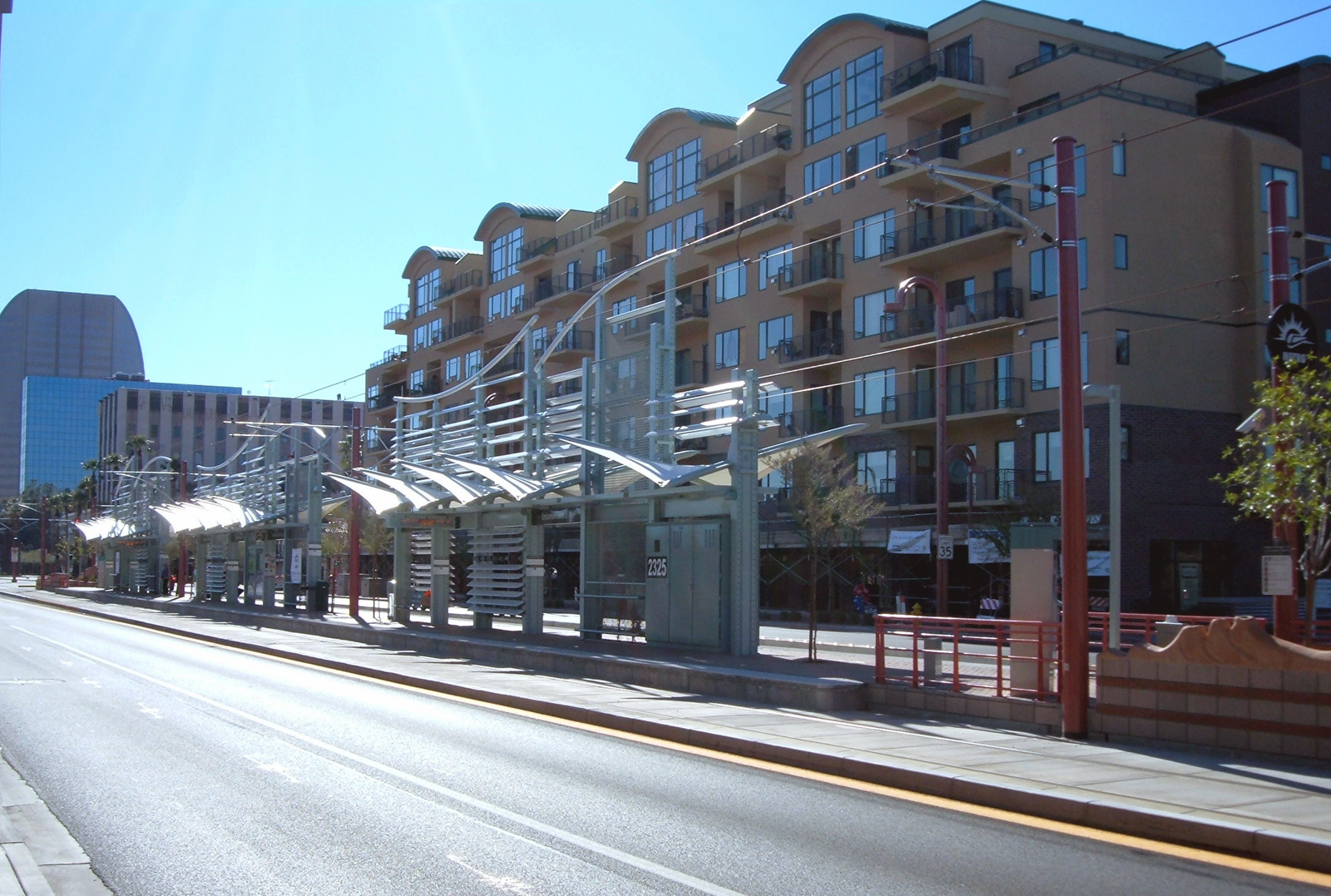
- The station in December 2008

General information
- Other names: Heard Museum
- Location: Central Avenue and Encanto Boulevard, Phoenix, Arizona; United States
- Coordinates: 33°28′25″N 112°4′25.50″W
- Owner: Valley Metro
- Operator: Valley Metro Rail & Streetcar
- Platforms: 1 island platform
- Tracks: 2
- Connections: Valley Metro Bus: 0

Construction
- Structure type: At-grade
- Accessible: Yes

Other information
- Station code: 10009

History
- Opened: December 27, 2008

Services
Preceding station	Valley Metro	Following station
Thomas/Central Avenue toward Metro Parkway	B Line	McDowell/Central Avenue toward Baseline/Central Avenue
Location

Encanto/Central Avenue station, also known as Heard Museum, is a light rail station on the B Line of the Valley Metro Rail & Streetcar system in Uptown Phoenix, Arizona, United States. The station is located on Central Avenue north of Encanto Boulevard directly in front of the Tapestry on Central condominium complex. The Heard Museum is located across the street from this station.

== Station art ==
The Central/Encanto station features art by Jamex & Einar de la Torre from San Diego, California.

== Ridership ==
Weekday rail passengers
Year	In	Out	Average daily in	Average daily out
2009	122,260	116,284	481	458
2010	123,680	122,184	489	483

== Places nearby ==
- Heard Museum
- U.S. Federal Building
- St. Mary's High School
- Monterey Park
- Willo Historic District
