= McDowell/Central Avenue station =

Light rail station in Phoenix, Arizona

McDowell/Central Ave
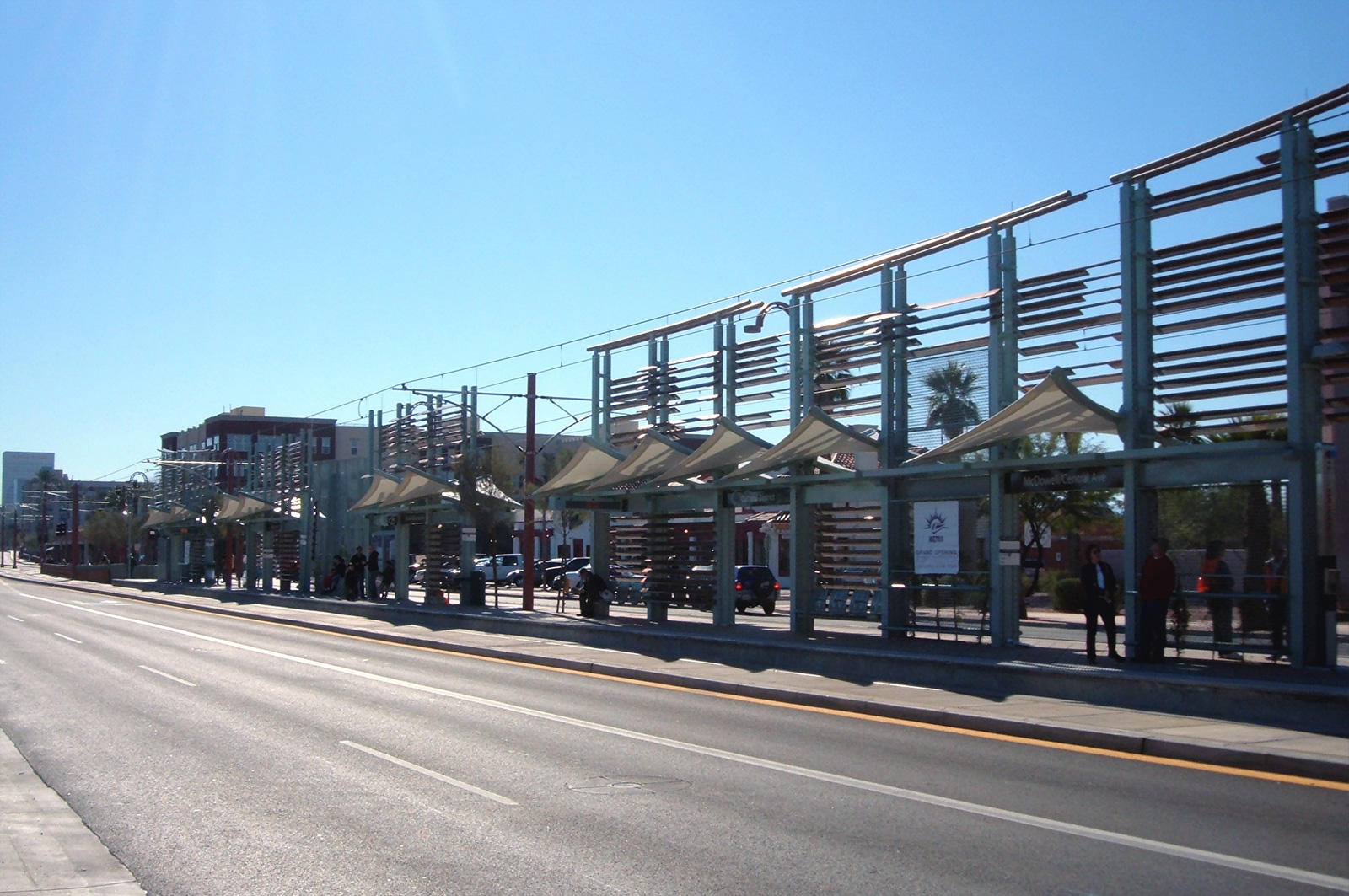
- The station in December 2008

General information
- Other names: Cultural District
- Location: Central Avenue and McDowell Road, Phoenix, Arizona; United States
- Coordinates: 33°27′53″N 112°4′25.50″W
- Owner: Valley Metro
- Operator: Valley Metro Rail & Streetcar
- Platforms: 1 island platform
- Tracks: 2
- Connections: Valley Metro Bus: 0, 17

Construction
- Structure type: At-grade
- Accessible: Yes

Other information
- Station code: 10010

History
- Opened: December 27, 2008

Services
Preceding station	Valley Metro	Following station
Encanto/Central Avenue toward Metro Parkway	B Line	Roosevelt/Central Avenue toward Baseline/Central Avenue
Location

McDowell/Central Avenue station, also known as Cultural District, is a light rail station on the B Line of the Valley Metro Rail & Streetcar system in Uptown Phoenix, Arizona, United States. It is located on Central Avenue south of McDowell Road, across the street from the Burton Barr Central Library and one block south of the Phoenix Art Museum.

== Ridership ==
Weekday rail passengers
Year	In	Out	Average daily in	Average daily out
2009	375,090	389,216	1,477	1,532
2010	434,642	423,494	1,718	1,674

== Notable places nearby ==
- Phoenix Art Museum
- Burton Barr Central Library
- Margaret T. Hance Park
- Arizona Academy of Science
- BMO Tower
- Phoenix Trolley Museum
- The Old Spaghetti Factory
