= Roosevelt/Central Avenue station =

Light rail station in Phoenix, Arizona

Roosevelt/Central Ave
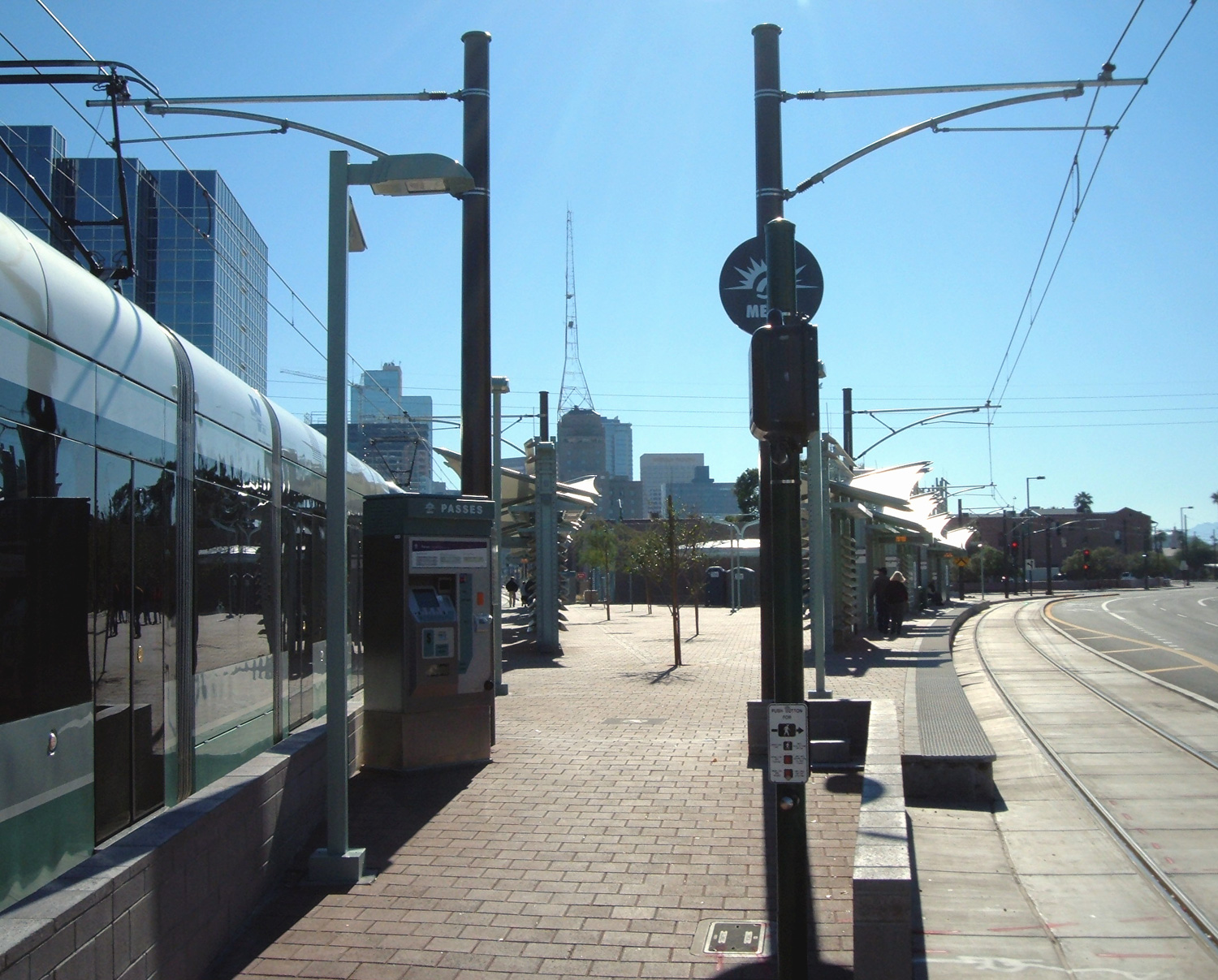
- The platform in December 2008

General information
- Other names: Arts District
- Location: Central Avenue and Roosevelt Street, Phoenix, Arizona; United States
- Coordinates: 33°27′33″N 112°4′26.50″W
- Owner: Valley Metro
- Operator: Valley Metro Rail & Streetcar
- Platforms: 1 island platform
- Tracks: 2
- Connections: Valley Metro Bus: 0, 10

Construction
- Structure type: At-grade
- Accessible: Yes

Other information
- Station code: 10011

History
- Opened: December 27, 2008

Services
Preceding station	Valley Metro	Following station
McDowell/Central Avenue toward Metro Parkway	B Line	Van Buren/Central Avenue One-way operation
McDowell/Central Avenue toward Metro Parkway	B Line	Van Buren/1st Avenue toward Baseline/Central Avenue
Location

Roosevelt/Central Avenue station, also known as Arts District, is a light rail station on the B Line of the Valley Metro Rail & Streetcar system in Downtown Phoenix, Arizona, United States. It is located on Central Avenue north of Roosevelt, in the Arts District.

== Ridership ==
Weekday rail passengers
Year	In	Out	Average daily in	Average daily out
2009	451,907	393,447	1,779	1,549
2010	361,986	344,484	1,431	1,362

== Notable places nearby ==
- Burton Barr Central Library
- Margaret T. Hance Park
- Japanese Friendship Garden of Phoenix (1125 N. 3rd Ave.)
- Trinity Cathedral
