= Roeser/Central Avenue station =

Light rail station in Phoenix, Arizona

Roeser/Central Ave

General information
- Location: Roeser Road and Central Avenue; Phoenix, Arizona; United States
- Coordinates: 33.399510°N 112.073334°W
- Owner: Valley Metro
- Operator: Valley Metro Rail & Streetcar
- Platforms: 1 island platform
- Tracks: 2
- Connections: Valley Metro Bus: 0, 52

Construction
- Structure type: At-grade
- Accessible: Yes

History
- Opened: June 7, 2025

Services
Preceding station	Valley Metro	Following station
Broadway/Central Avenue toward Metro Parkway	B Line	Southern/Central Avenue toward Baseline/Central Avenue
Location

Roeser/Central Avenue station is a light rail station on the B Line of the Valley Metro Rail & Streetcar system in Phoenix. Built as part of the South Central Extension it located on Central Avenue at Roeser Road. The station opened on June 7, 2025.

== Notable places nearby ==
- The Israel of God Bible Study Class
- Sunland STEAM Academy
