= Van Buren/1st Avenue and Van Buren/Central Avenue stations =

Light rail station in Phoenix, Arizona

Van Buren/1st Ave Van Buren/Central Ave
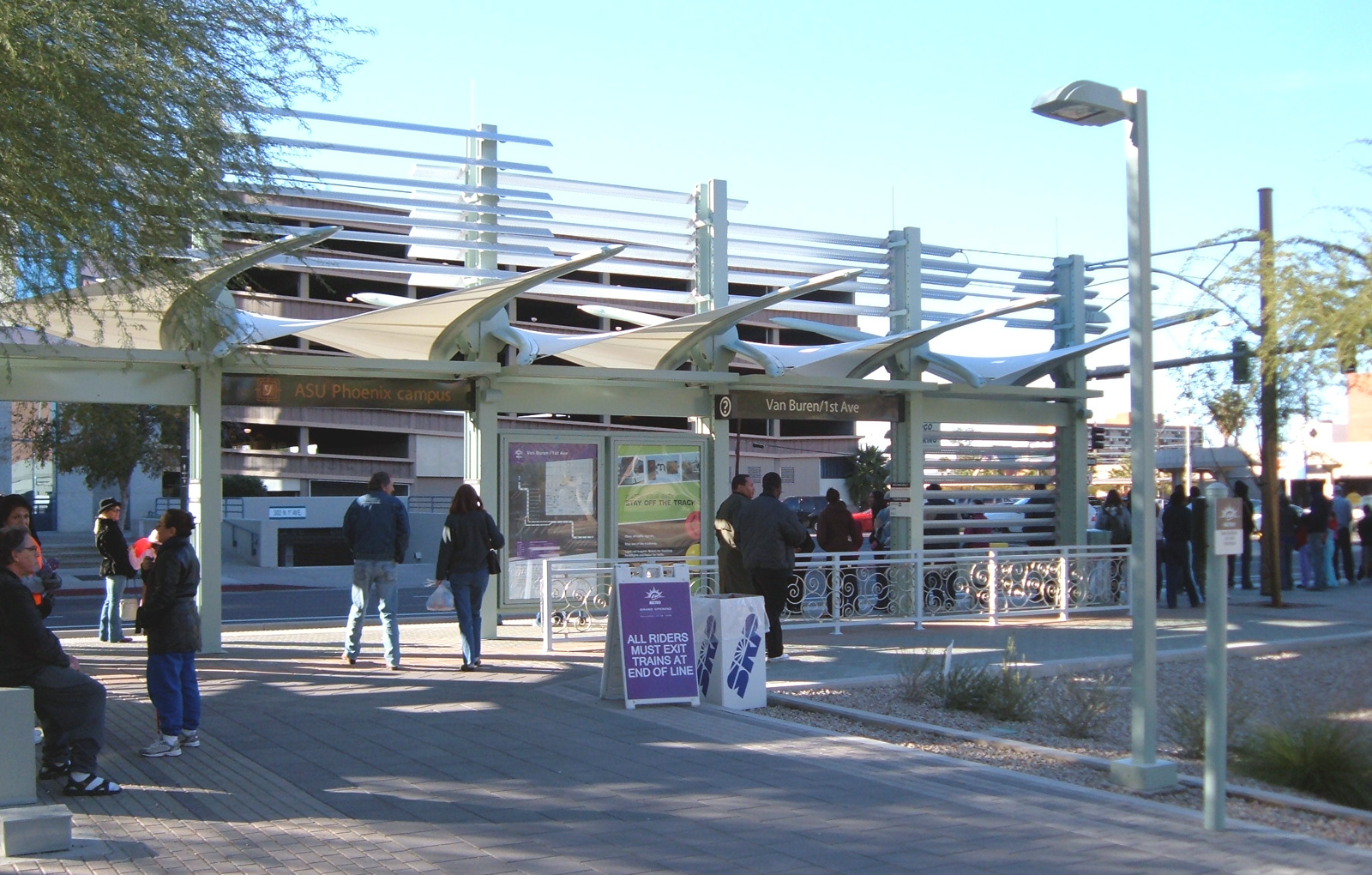
- The southbound platform in December 2008

General information
- Other names: ASU Phoenix Campus
- Location: Van Buren Street and 1st Avenue; Van Buren Street and Central Avenue, Phoenix, Arizona; United States
- Coordinates: 33°27′6″N 112°4′28.50″W
- Owner: Valley Metro
- Operator: Valley Metro Rail & Streetcar
- Platforms: 1 island platform
- Tracks: 2
- Connections: Valley Metro Bus: 0, 1, 3, 7, 8, 10, Downtown Phoenix Dash, Grand Avenue Limited, 514, 520, 521, 522, 531, 533, 535, 542, 562, 563, 571, 573, 575, I-10 East RAPID, I-10 West RAPID, I-17 RAPID, South Mountain East RAPID

Construction
- Structure type: At-grade
- Accessible: Yes

Other information
- Station code: 10012, 10033

History
- Opened: December 27, 2008

Services
Preceding station	Valley Metro	Following station
Van Buren/Central Avenue
Roosevelt/Central Avenue toward Metro Parkway	B Line	Downtown Phoenix Hub One-way operation
Roosevelt/Central Avenue toward Metro Parkway	B Line	Washington/Central Avenue (mornings only) One-way operation
Van Buren/1st Avenue
Roosevelt/Central Avenue One-way operation	B Line	Downtown Phoenix Hub toward Baseline/Central Avenue
Location

Van Buren/1st Avenue and Van Buren/Central Avenue stations, also known as ASU Phoenix Campus, is a pair of stations on the B Line of the Valley Metro Rail & Streetcar system in Downtown Phoenix, Arizona. Despite having at least four different names, it is all actually one facility, which serves as a stop for various city buses.

The station is configured in an island platform design, with the southbound platform which is located on 1st Avenue at Van Buren Street and the northbound platform located on Central Avenue at Van Buren Street, approximately 400 feet (120 m) apart.

== Ridership ==
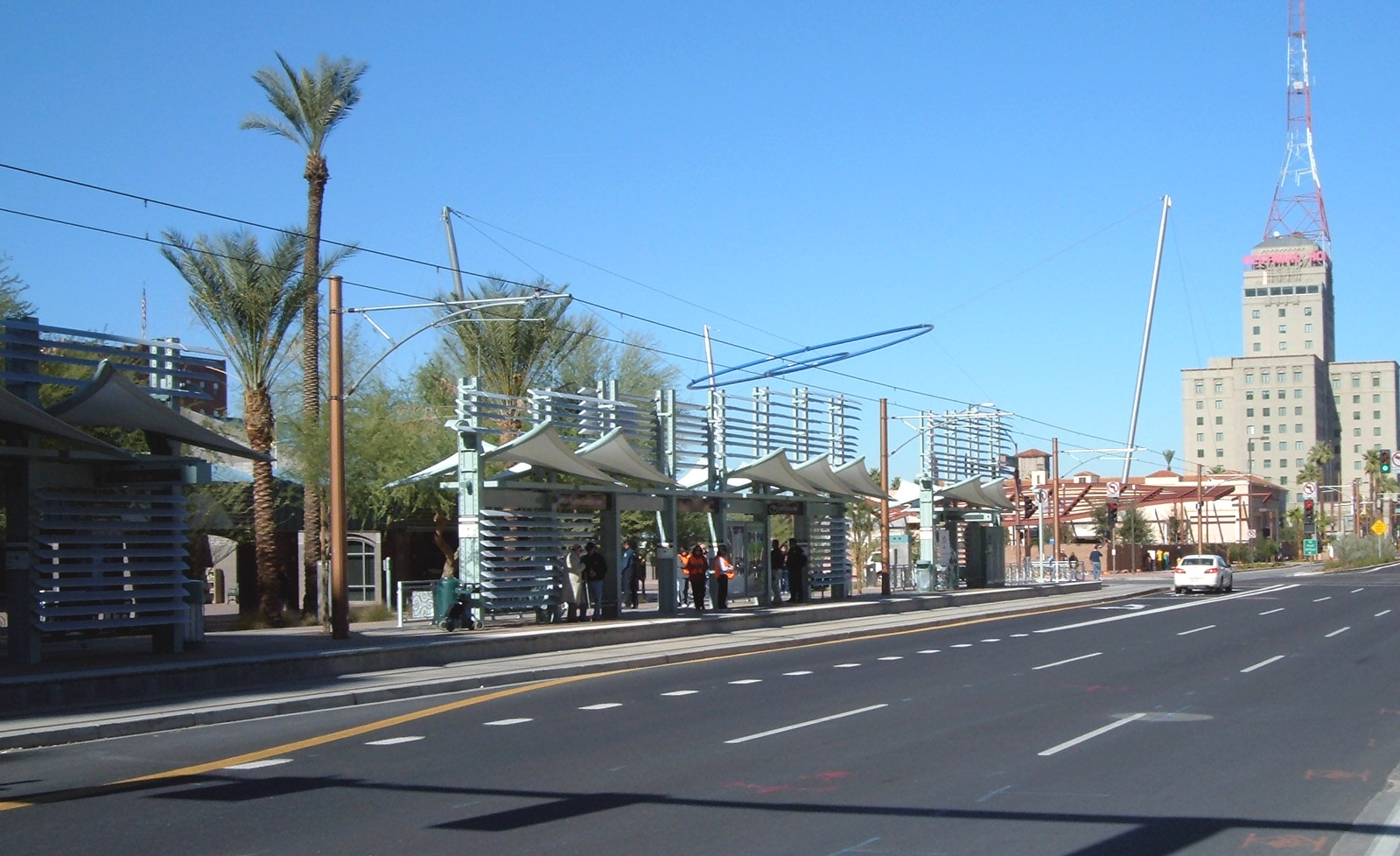
The northbound platform in December 2008, with the Westward Ho in the background

Weekday rail passengers
Year	In	Out	Average daily in	Average daily out
2009	487,617	484,226	1,920	1,906
2010	722,519	699,623	2,855	2,765
2011	846,556	814,385	3,386	3,257
2012	933,669	891,822	3,734	3,567
2013	927,532	879,009	3,710	3,516
2014	928,865	880,238	3,715	3,520
2015	911,971	849,842	3,647	3,399

Passenger counts shown here are the combined ridership from both the 1st Avenue and Central Avenue platforms.

== Future ==
Greg Stanton Central Station will be the eastern terminus of the Phoenix BRT 35th Avenue and Van Buren Street bus rapid transit line. The BRT line will run from the Thelda Williams Transit Center to Greg Stanton Central Station.

== Notable nearby places ==
- Hotel San Carlos
- Valley Youth Theatre
- Herberger Theater Center
- ASU Downtown Complex
- Chase Tower
- Freeport-McMoRan Center
- Civic Space Park
