= Glendale/19th Avenue station =

Light rail station in Phoenix, Arizona

Glendale/19th Ave
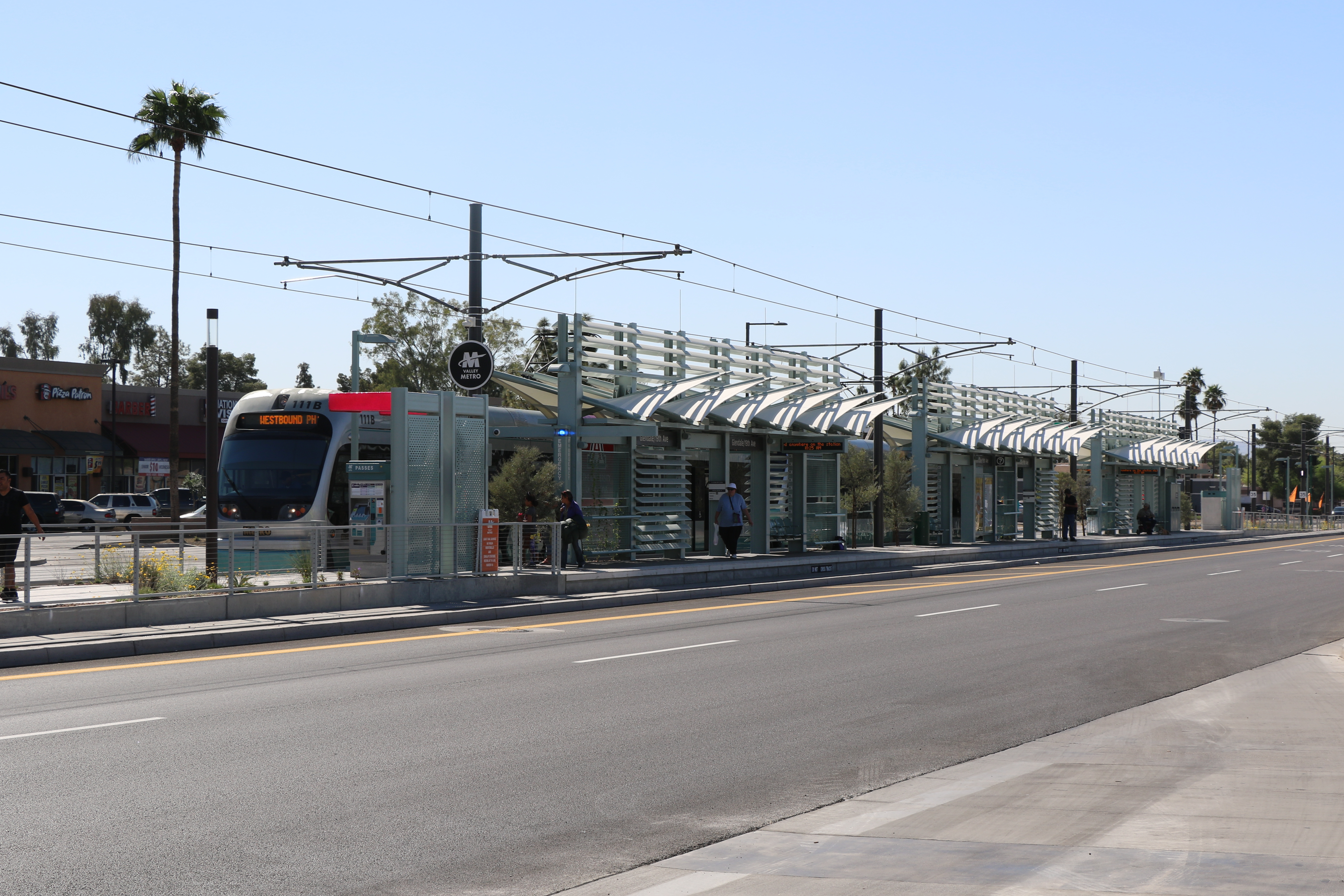
- The station, on opening day in March 2016

General information
- Location: West Glendale & North 19th Avenues, Phoenix, Arizona; United States
- Coordinates: 33°32′14.84″N 112°5′58.88″W
- Owner: Valley Metro
- Operator: Valley Metro Rail & Streetcar
- Platforms: 1 island platform
- Tracks: 2
- Connections: Valley Metro Bus: 19, 70

Construction
- Structure type: At-grade
- Accessible: Yes

Other information
- Station code: 18606

History
- Opened: March 21, 2016

Services
Preceding station	Valley Metro	Following station
Northern/19th Avenue toward Metro Parkway	B Line	Montebello/19th Avenue toward Baseline/Central Avenue
Location

Glendale/19th Avenue station is a station on the B Line of the Valley Metro Rail & Streetcar system in Phoenix, Arizona. It was opened as part of Phase I of the Northwest Extension of the system on March 19, 2016.

== Notable places nearby ==
- Banner Health
- Bookmans
- Beatitudes Campus
- Beth El Congregation
- Greyhound
- Islamic Community Center of Phoenix
- Phoenix Day School For the Deaf
- Queen of the Holy Rosary Catholic Church
- Ridge at the Stratford
- Washington High School

== Ridership ==
Weekday rail passengers
Year	Average daily in	Average daily out
2022	761	744
