= Broadway/Central Avenue station =

Light rail station in Phoenix, Arizona

Broadway/Central Ave

General information
- Other names: Travis Williams Family Center; MLK Boulevard/Central Avenue
- Location: Broadway Road and Central Avenue; Phoenix, Arizona; United States
- Coordinates: 33.406659°N 112.073338°W
- Owner: Valley Metro
- Operator: Valley Metro Rail & Streetcar
- Platforms: 1 island platform
- Tracks: 2
- Connections: Valley Metro Bus: 0, 45

Construction
- Structure type: At-grade
- Accessible: Yes

History
- Opened: June 7, 2025

Services
Preceding station	Valley Metro	Following station
Pioneer/Central Avenue toward Metro Parkway	B Line	Roeser/Central Avenue toward Baseline/Central Avenue
Location

Broadway/Central Avenue station, also known as Travis Williams Family Center and MLK Boulevard/Central Avenue, is a light rail station on the B Line of the Valley Metro Rail & Streetcar system in Phoenix. The station opened on June 7, 2025. The station includes a park-and-ride facility.

== Notable places nearby ==
- Cesar Chavez Community School
- Hayden Park
- Muhammad Mosque #32
- Rancho Grande Plaza
