= Pioneer/Central Avenue station =

Light rail station in Phoenix, Arizona

Pioneer/Central Ave

General information
- Other names: Rio Salado Audubon Center
- Location: Pioneer Road and Central Avenue; Phoenix, Arizona; United States
- Coordinates: 33.418207°N 112.073523°W
- Owner: Valley Metro
- Operator: Valley Metro Rail & Streetcar
- Platforms: 1 island platform
- Tracks: 2
- Connections: Valley Metro Bus: 0

Construction
- Structure type: At-grade
- Accessible: Yes

History
- Opened: June 7, 2025

Services
Preceding station	Valley Metro	Following station
Buckeye/Central Avenue toward Metro Parkway	B Line	Broadway/Central Avenue toward Baseline/Central Avenue
Location

Pioneer/Central Avenue station, also known as Rio Salado Audubon Center, is a light rail station on the B Line of the Valley Metro Rail & Streetcar system in Phoenix. Built as part of the South Central Extension it is located on Central Avenue near the corner of Pioneer Road. The station opened on June 7, 2025.

== Notable places nearby ==
- Nina Mason Pulliam Rio Salado Audubon Center
- Rio Salado Habitat Restoration Area
- Rio Salado Trail
- The Society Of St. Vincent De Paul
