= Northern/19th Avenue station =

Light rail station in Phoenix, Arizona

Northern/19th Ave
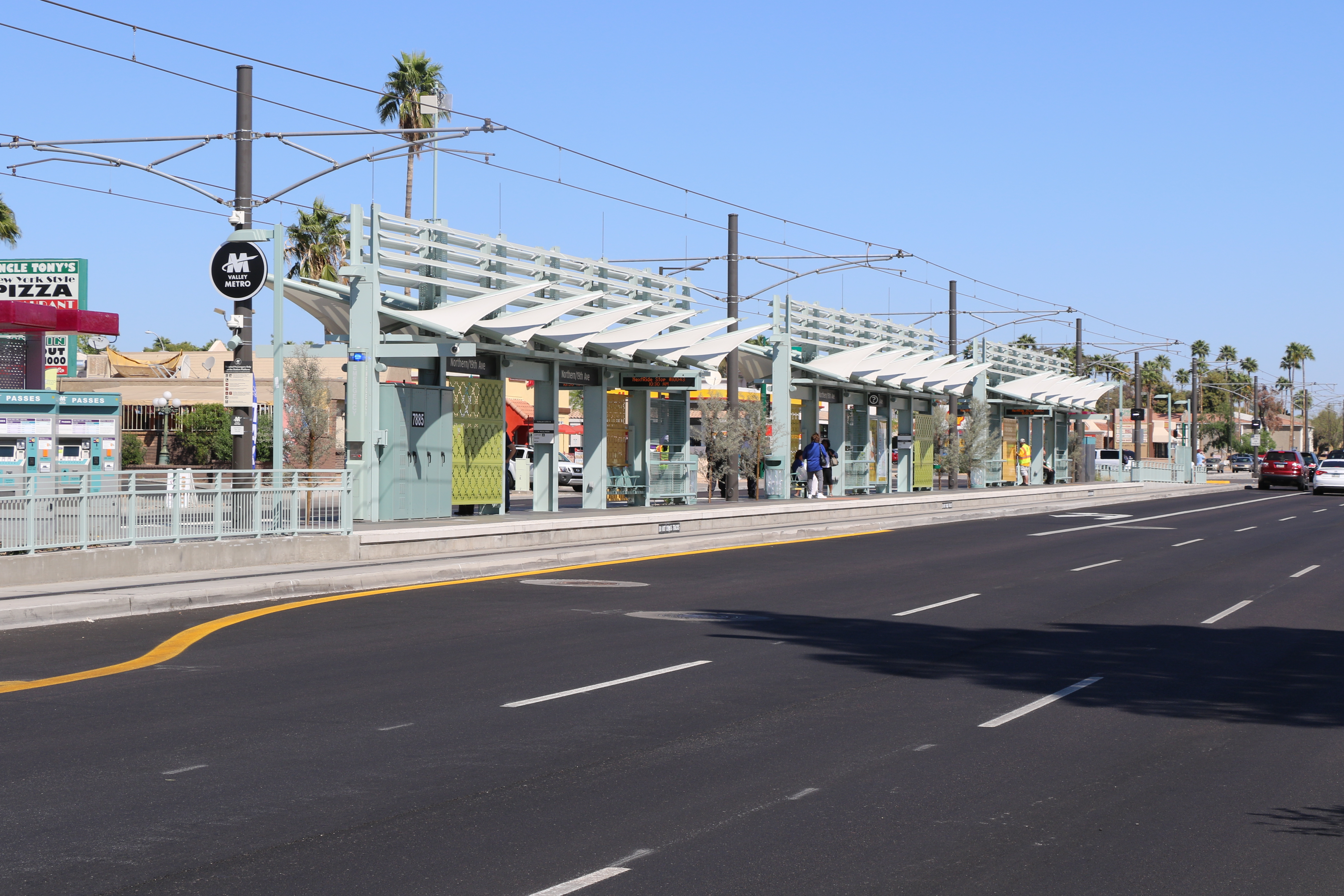
- The station, on opening day in March 2016

General information
- Other names: 19NORTH Community
- Location: 7885 North 19th Avenue, Phoenix, Arizona; United States
- Coordinates: 33°33′13.08″N 112°5′58.75″W
- Owner: Valley Metro
- Operator: Valley Metro Rail & Streetcar
- Platforms: 1 island platform
- Tracks: 2
- Connections: Valley Metro Bus: 19, 80

Construction
- Structure type: At-grade
- Accessible: Yes

Other information
- Station code: 18607

History
- Opened: March 19, 2016

Services
Preceding station	Valley Metro	Following station
19th Avenue/Dunlap toward Metro Parkway	B Line	Glendale/19th Avenue toward Baseline/Central Avenue
Location

Northern/19th Avenue station, also known as 19NORTH Community, is a station on the B Line of the Valley Metro Rail & Streetcar system in Phoenix, Arizona. It was opened as part of Phase I of the Northwest Extension of the system on March 19, 2016.

== Notable places nearby ==
- Banner Health
- Orangewood Elementary School
- Tree of Life Christian Center

== Ridership ==
Weekday rail passengers
Year	Average daily in	Average daily out
2022	607	604
