= 19th Avenue/Dunlap station =

Light rail station in Phoenix, Arizona

19th Ave/Dunlap
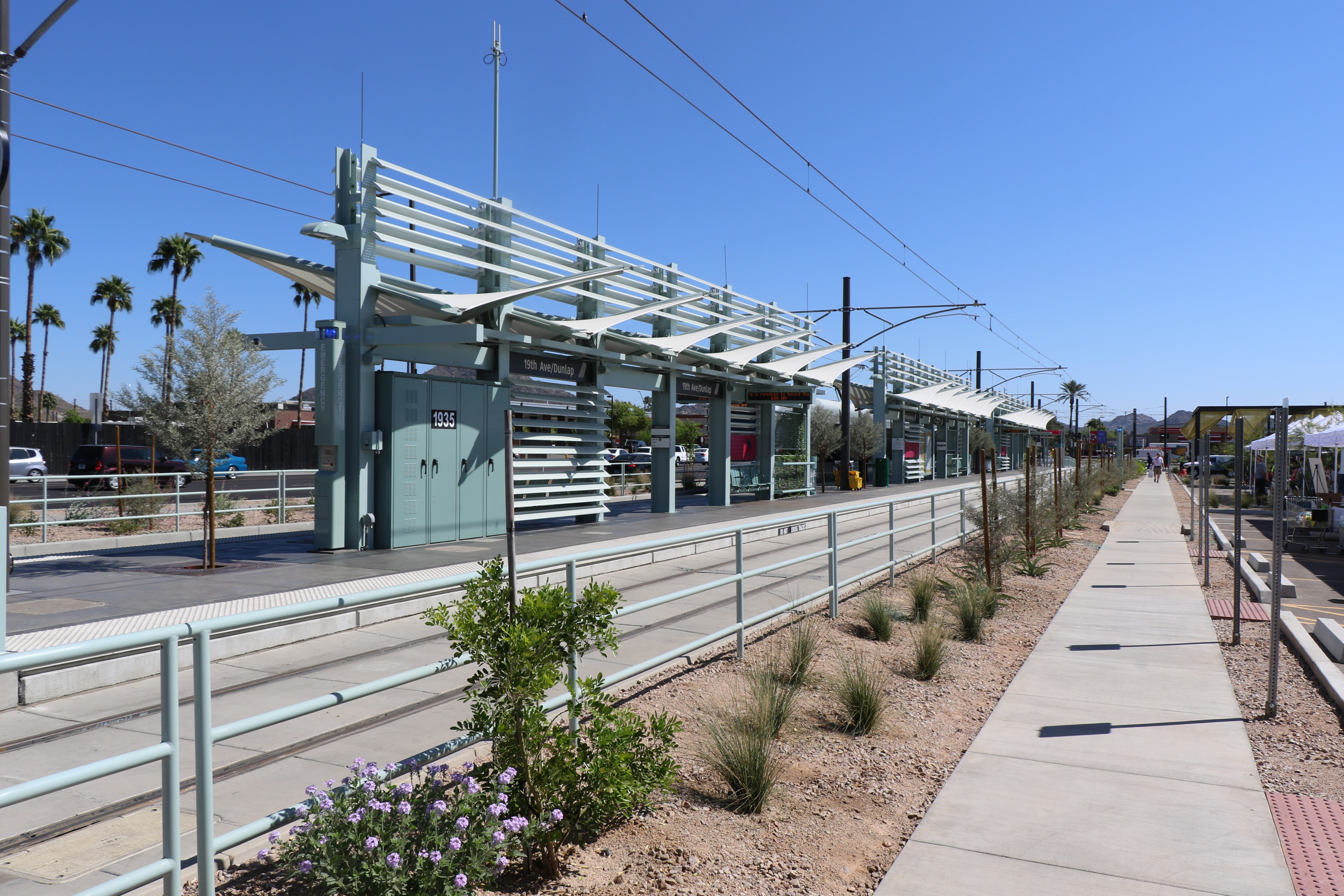
- The station, on opening day in March 2016

General information
- Location: 1935 West Dunlap Avenue, Phoenix, Arizona; United States
- Coordinates: 33°34′2.58″N 112°6′3.06″W
- Owner: Valley Metro
- Operator: Valley Metro Rail & Streetcar
- Platforms: 1 island platform
- Tracks: 2
- Connections: Valley Metro Bus: 19, 90, 122

Construction
- Structure type: At-grade
- Parking: 415 spaces
- Cycle facilities: 8 lockers
- Accessible: Yes

Other information
- Station code: 18608

History
- Opened: March 19, 2016

Services
Preceding station	Valley Metro	Following station
25th Avenue/Dunlap toward Metro Parkway	B Line	Northern/19th Avenue toward Baseline/Central Avenue
Location

19th Avenue/Dunlap station is a station on the B Line of the Valley Metro Rail & Streetcar system in Phoenix, Arizona. It was opened as part of Phase I of the Northwest Extension of the system on March 19, 2016, and remained the northwestern terminus of the line until January 27, 2024, when Phase II extended the line to Metro Parkway.

== Notable places nearby ==
- Alicia Park
- DeVry University

== Ridership ==
Weekday rail passengers
Year	Average daily in	Average daily out
2022	1,583	1,663
