= Lincoln/1st Avenue and Lincoln/Central Avenue stations =

Pair of light rail stations in Phoenix, Arizona

Lincoln/1st Ave Lincoln/Central Ave

General information
- Other names: Grant Park (Lincoln/1st Avenue); Carver Museum (Lincoln/Central Avenue); Warehouse District (Lincoln/Central Avenue)
- Location: Phoenix, Arizona; United States
- Coordinates: 33°26′32″N 112°4′28″W
- Owner: Valley Metro
- Operator: Valley Metro Rail & Streetcar
- Platforms: 2 side platforms
- Tracks: 2
- Connections: Valley Metro Bus: 0

Construction
- Structure type: At-grade
- Accessible: Yes

History
- Opened: June 7, 2025

Services
| Preceding station | Valley Metro | Following station |
Lincoln/Central Avenue
| Downtown Phoenix Hub toward Metro Parkway | B Line | Buckeye/Central Avenue One-way operation |
| Washington/Central Avenue (mornings only) toward Metro Parkway | B Line | Buckeye/Central Avenue One-way operation |
Lincoln/1st Avenue
| Downtown Phoenix Hub One-way operation | B Line | Buckeye/Central Avenue toward Baseline/Central Avenue |
Location

Lincoln/1st Avenue and Lincoln/Central Avenue stations, also known as Grant Park (Lincoln/1st Avenue) and Carver Museum and Warehouse District (Lincoln/Central Avenue) are a pair of light rail stations on the B Line of the Valley Metro Rail & Streetcar system in Phoenix, Arizona, United States. Built as part of the South Central Extension it is located on 1st Avenue and Central Avenue near the intersection of Lincoln Street. The station opened on June 7, 2025.

== Notable places nearby ==
- Friendly House
- George Washington Carver Museum and Cultural Center
- Grant Park
- Last Exit Live
- Phoenix Union Station
- The Duce
- The Icehouse
- Warehouse District
- Warehouse215
- 435Collective
