= Southern/Central Avenue station =

Light rail station in Phoenix, Arizona

Southern/Central Ave

General information
- Other names: South Mountain Community Center
- Location: Southern Avenue and Central Avenue; Phoenix, Arizona; United States
- Coordinates: 33.392090°N 112.073302°W
- Owner: Valley Metro
- Operator: Valley Metro Rail & Streetcar
- Platforms: 1 island platform
- Tracks: 2
- Connections: Valley Metro Bus: 0, 61

Construction
- Structure type: At-grade
- Accessible: Yes

History
- Opened: June 7, 2025

Services
Preceding station	Valley Metro	Following station
Roeser/Central Avenue toward Metro Parkway	B Line	Baseline/Central Avenue Terminus
Location

Southern/Central Avenue station, also known as South Mountain Community Center, is a light rail station on the B Line of the Valley Metro Rail & Streetcar system in Phoenix. Built as part of the South Central Extension it is located on Central Avenue at Southern Avenue. The station opened on June 7, 2025.

== Notable places nearby ==
- El Reposo Park
- Saint Catherine of Siena Roman Catholic Church
- St. John Bosco Chapel
- South Mountain Community Center
- South Plaza
