= 25th Avenue/Dunlap station =

Light rail station in Phoenix, Arizona

25th Ave/Dunlap

General information
- Location: Phoenix, Arizona; United States
- Coordinates: 33.567581°N 112.111372°W
- Owner: Valley Metro
- Operator: Valley Metro Rail & Streetcar
- Platforms: 1 island platform
- Tracks: 2

Construction
- Accessible: Yes

History
- Opened: January 27, 2024

Services
Preceding station	Valley Metro	Following station
Mountain View/25th Avenue toward Metro Parkway	B Line	19th Avenue/Dunlap toward Baseline/Central Avenue
Location

25th Avenue/Dunlap station is a light rail station on the B Line of the Valley Metro Rail & Streetcar system in Phoenix. The station opened on January 27, 2024 as part of the Northwest Extension Phase II.

== Notable places nearby ==
- Brookline College
- UEI College
