= Copper Card =

Public transit smart card used in Phoenix

- Location: Metro Phoenix
- Launched: August 19, 2024
- Technology: MIFARE DESFire smart card
- Manager: Vix Technology
- Currency: US $
- Stored-value: Pay as you go
- Auto recharge: Autoload replenishment
- Validity: Valley Metro Rail & Streetcar; Valley Metro Bus; Phoenix BRT (2030)
- Retailed: Online; Vending machines; Service centers; Convenience stores; Retail stores
- Website: valleymetrofares.org

The Copper Card is a contactless smartcard fare collection system used by Valley Metro in Metro Phoenix, Arizona. The Copper Card and the Valley Metro mobile app are accepted on Valley Metro Rail & Streetcar and Valley Metro Bus services.

The Copper Card replaces Valley Metro's paper passes and tickets. Daily, weekly, and monthly passes are available with fare capping, which automatically credits the cost of individual trips towards a pass.

Valley Metro began researching new payment systems in 2015, following the passage of the Proposition 104 transit tax measure. Valley Metro and the city of Phoenix awarded a contract to provide the system to Australian firm Vix Technology in 2020. Mobile payments were added to the Valley Metro app in March 2023, and the first Copper Cards were distributed in early 2024. The Copper Card system was officially launched in August 2024 and replaced all paper passes at the end of October 2024.

== Technology ==
The Copper Card is a contactless smartcard, the same size as a credit card. Value can be added to Copper Cards at many major retailers that sell gift cards, using an existing payments network maintained by InComm Payments. This technology requires no special hardware at retailers, allowing Copper Cards to be sold on gift card racks at national and local retailers throughout the Phoenix metropolitan area. The accompanying Valley Metro mobile app is available for iOS and Android devices, and is free.

== History ==
=== Predecessors ===
Since the 1990s, Valley Metro has adopted innovative solutions for fare payment. Phoenix Transit System, a predecessor of Valley Metro, created an innovative postpaid billing system for employer-sponsored passes in 1991. This system, marketed as the Bus Card Plus, used an early form of fare capping, where employers were charged for their employees' rides up to the cost of a monthly bus pass. Bus fareboxes were equipped with magnetic stripe card readers, which were built in-house.

In 1995, Valley Metro began accepting MasterCard and Visa credit cards onboard buses. The acceptance of credit cards onboard buses was initially viewed as a major innovation, but it had numerous shortcomings. Credit card transactions were not processed in real time, due to technical and financial limitations. Instead, credit card information was downloaded from the fareboxes at bus garages, and charges were submitted to MasterCard and Visa weekly. This method saved money on processing fees, but it made Valley Metro liable for declined or fraudulent transactions. The cost of fraudulent transactions proved to be too high, and Valley Metro stopped accepting credit cards in 2002.

Valley Metro introduced its previous system of paper bus passes in 2007. Buses accepted cash payments and paper daily, weekly, and monthly passes, and paper tickets were sold at light rail stations. This system used proprietary hardware made by Scheidt & Bachmann and was not easily expandable. The Bus Card Plus program for employer-sponsored passes was rebranded as the Platinum Pass, using a new proprietary smartcard.

=== Proposal ===
Valley Metro and the city of Phoenix began researching new fare payment systems in 2015, following the passage of the Proposition 104 transit tax measure. The city of Phoenix led the project and defined four goals for a new system: improved customer-facing technology, the ability to collect better statistics, improved distribution networks for fare media, and long-term resilience. In 2018, the new system was expected to be fully operational by 2021.

Valley Metro and the city of Phoenix awarded a 19-year contract to Vix Technology in July 2020. The contract includes equipment, technology, and services for a new fare collection system for all Valley Metro services, including buses and light rail.

=== Launch ===
Valley Metro Mobile Fare QR code

A new Valley Metro mobile app was launched in 2021, and mobile payments within the app became available as a pilot program in 2022. Installation of new card readers, which also support the mobile app, began on buses and at light rail stations in late 2022. Mobile payments were fully accepted across bus and light rail services beginning in February 2023. Fares in the app can be purchased with a credit or debit card, Apple Pay, Google Pay, or cash using the Retail Network. The Valley Metro App works with a QR code in the mobile app that functions either as an Adult Copper Card, or a reduced fare Copper Card, available only with a reduced fare account. Some special events will issue a special pass via the Valley Metro Mobile App bundled with a special event ticket, such as a concert, or a sporting event (For example, NCAA Final Four). The ability to associate a special card such as the Platinum card will be available to add to the app in the future.

The installation of the Copper Card system was delayed due to supply chain disruptions in the wake of the COVID-19 pandemic.

In April 2024, ADA, Platinum, and A+ Copper Cards were activated to use on rail and buses. These cards are issued to disabled individuals, employees of major employers, and students respectively.

On August 19, 2024, Valley Metro officially launched the Copper Card. With the full launch of the system, retail stores began selling Copper Cards including Albertsons, CVS, Safeway, and Walgreens and convenience stores including Circle K.

Valley Metro stopped honoring paper magnetic stripe passes on October 28, 2024.

== Rates ==
The Copper Card and the Valley Metro mobile app support fare capping, branded as Smart Fare. Fare capping credits each single ride fare towards the cost of a daily, weekly, and monthly pass. Daily, weekly, and monthly passes are no longer sold up front, and are activated by fare capping once they are earned.

The Copper Card is accepted on Valley Metro bus services, including local, RAPID, and express services. It is also accepted on the Valley Metro Rail & Streetcar system. The Copper Card is not yet accepted on paratransit services or rural route 685 to Ajo though plans are in place to integrate these services into the fare system in the future.

It is planned to allow the Copper Card and associated Valley Metro app account to be able to be used on Microtransit services and/or ride share services in the future.

It is planned that the Phoenix BRT will use the Copper Card and Valley Metro App when it opens in 2030.

Valley Metro fares
Fare type	Local bus and light rail	Streetcar	Express / RAPID^{1}	Reduced fare^{2}
Single ride	$2	$1	$3.25	$1 ($.50 for Streetcar)
Daily cap	$4	$4	$6.50	$2
Weekly cap	$20	$20	-	$10
Monthly cap	$64	$64	$104	$32
Notes: 1. A local/light rail fare can be used on an Express or RAPID route for a $1.25 upcharge, or a $2.25 charge for reduced-fare customers.; 2. Reduced fares are available for individuals with disabilities, seniors aged 65 and older, children ages 6 to 18, and Medicare beneficiaries.

== Card variants ==
Variants	Design	Fare type	Availability
Adult		Adult fare	Most common fare card - reloadable and used by the general public. 1-day, 7-day, and 31-day limited use versions distributed by select organizations/businesses.
Reduced		Reduced fare	Only available with a reduced fare account via Valley Metro. 1-day, 7-day, and 31-day limited use versions distributed by select organizations/businesses.
Platinum		Unlimited travel	Card for organizations and businesses that cover the cost of fare for their employees, residents, etc. Subject to monthly fare capping billed to the organization. Issued by ASU to students under the ASU U-Pass program (fares are billed to ASU upon each tap, up to the cost of monthly fare capping.)
Special Events Pass		Adult Fare	Card issued as requested by special events. Would be available to purchase from specifically assigned Fare Vending Machines or retailers. Could be bundled with an event ticket. Can be a special design, or the same design as the "Social Services" Copper Card.
ADA Platinum		Unlimited travel	Provides free transit for ADA eligible and certified riders, as well as one personal care attendant. Fares are covered by the member city, depending on the jurisdiction the card was tapped.
A+		Youth (K-12), Unlimited Travel	Card for students that is issued by participating schools. Subject to monthly reduced fare capping billed to the school that issued the card.
City of Tempe Youth Transit Pass		Youth, Unlimited Travel	Card for youth that live in the City of Tempe.
Social Services/Limited Use Card		Unlimited travel	Card for clients for transportation to and from important non-recreational activities such as: employment interviews, work, childcare facilities, food/drug store, school/training and medical appointments. 1-day, 7-day, and 31-day versions are available. Fares are billed to the issuing organization at a reduced fare rate.
South Central Extension		Adult Fare	Commemorates the opening of the South Central Extension
2025 Holiday		Adult Fare	Commemorates the 2025 Holiday season

== See also ==
- List of public transport smart cards
