= Mountain View/25th Avenue station =

Light rail station in Phoenix, Arizona

Mountain View/25th Ave

General information
- Other names: Rose Mofford Park
- Location: Phoenix, Arizona; United States
- Coordinates: 33.573186°N 112.112156°W
- Owner: Valley Metro
- Operator: Valley Metro Rail & Streetcar
- Platforms: 1 island platform
- Tracks: 2

Construction
- Accessible: Yes

History
- Opened: January 27, 2024

Services
Preceding station	Valley Metro	Following station
Metro Parkway Terminus	B Line	25th Avenue/Dunlap toward Baseline/Central Avenue
Location

Mountain View/25th Avenue station, also known as Rose Mofford Park, is a light rail station on the B Line of the Valley Metro Rail & Streetcar system in Phoenix. The station opened on January 27, 2024 as part of the Northwest Extension Phase II and consists of one island platform.

== Notable places nearby ==
- Arizona Canal Trail
- Brookline College
- Rose Mofford Dog Park
- Rose Mofford Sports Complex
- UEI College
