= Phoenix Civic Space Park =

Urban park in Phoenix, Arizona

Civic Space Park
- Interactive map of Civic Space Park
- Type: Public Park
- Location: 424 North Central Avenue; Phoenix, Arizona 85004
- Coordinates: 33°27′12″N 112°4′28″W
- Area: 2.77 acres (1.12 ha)
- Created: April 16, 2009
- Operator: Phoenix Parks and Recreation Department
- Status: Open Daily 5am to 11pm
- Website: Park Website

Civic Space Park is an urban park in Downtown Phoenix, Arizona which first opened to the public in April 2009. It is located directly across Central Avenue from the main part of the ASU Downtown Campus. It is also located north of the Central Station Valley Metro Rail and bus transfer stations.

== History ==
The land the park is located on was a combination of old buildings and parking lots before the City of Phoenix began buying the properties. The main building renovated in the project is called the A.E. England Building. Originally opened in the 1920s as a car dealership, it now houses retail space and a community meeting room for special events. In the outdoor spaces, the majority of the park (over 70%) will be shaded, once all the trees have fully matured, through a combination of trees and shade structures. Solar panels covering the tops of the shade canopies produce a combined 75 kilowatts of power. The centerpiece of the park is the US$2.4 million sculpture by Janet Echelman called Her Secret Is Patience. It consists of multicolored fiber nets suspended up to 145 feet (44 m) in the air. At night ground-mounted colored lighting changes throughout the season and gives a different appearance to the daytime look. It was questionable whether or not the piece would be built as the leaders at the City of Phoenix changed their minds several times whether or not to build the art piece. In 2011 the park won the Rudy Bruner Award for Urban Excellence silver medal.
