= Lincoln Central =

Lincoln Central may refer to:

- Lincoln railway station in England, formerly named Lincoln Central
- Lincoln/1st Avenue and Lincoln/Central Avenue stations, in Phoenix, Arizona
