= Phoenix BRT =

Bus rapid transit project that is planned

Overview
- Status: Planned
- Owner: City of Phoenix
- Locale: Phoenix, Arizona
- Termini: Thelda Williams Transit Center; Greg Stanton Central Station
- Stations: 16

Service
- Type: Bus rapid transit
- System: Valley Metro
- Operator: Valley Metro

History
- Opened: 2031

Technical
- Line length: 13.6 miles (21.9 km)
- Character: Bus rapid transit

Phoenix BRT will be Phoenix's first bus rapid transit line in the city. The system was announced in 2015 when voters approved Proposition 400, and is currently in the detailed corridor planning phase. Construction of the BRT line will begin in 2029 and will be completed in 2031.

== Background ==
In 2015, Phoenix voters approved Proposition 400 which included adding a bus rapid transit system to the city. Phoenix BRT had 6 options for the first bus rapid transit line.

In Early 2020, Phoenix BRT started its Initial Outreach which started with a new website.

In Mid 2020, Phoenix BRT started meetings with the general public.

In Late 2020, Phoenix BRT started showing presentations to the general public.

In Late 2021, Phoenix BRT had online meetings and viewers gave the opinion on what line they liked best.

The six lines were given were:

- Camelback Road and 24th Street
- Indian School Road and 24th Street
- Thomas Road and 44th Street
- McDowell Road and 44th Street
- 35th Avenue and Van Buren Street
- 19th Avenue and Van Buren Street

The line that was chosen was the 35th Avenue and Van Buren Street line. The BRT line will run from the Thelda Williams Transit Center to Greg Stanton Central Station.

Lane Option B – center median lanes with central platforms was identified as the locally preferred option in September 2025 and selected for implementation along the 35th Avenue Corridor.

Lane Option B – center median lanes with central platforms was identified as the locally preferred option in March 2026 and selected for implementation along the Van Buren Street Corridor.

The eastern section of the 35th Avenue/Van Buren Street BRT will be mixed-running from 7th Avenue to Central Avenue due to limited roadway width, existing building infrastructure, and right-of-way impacts.

Construction of the 35th Avenue Corridor will begin in 2029 and will be completed in 2031. Construction of the Van Buren Street Corridor will begin in 2029 and will be completed in 2031.

It is planned that the Phoenix BRT will use the Copper Card and Valley Metro App when it opens in 2030.

=== Stations ===
The following is the complete list of stations, from north to east. Each station is located within the city limits of Phoenix, Arizona.

| Stations | Neighborhood | Major connections and notes |
|---|---|---|
| Thelda Williams Transit Center | Metro | Park and ride: 263 spaces |
| Cheryl Dr/Metro Parkway | Metro | |
| 35th Ave/Dunlap Ave | Cortez | |
| 35th Ave/Northern Ave | Harmont | |
| 35th Ave/Glendale Ave | Ocotillo | |
| 35th Ave/Bethany Home Road | Stella | |
| 35th Ave/Camelback Road | Cordova | |
| 35th Ave/Indian School Road | Granada | |
| 35th Ave/Thomas Road | Granada | |
| 35th Ave/McDowell Road | Isaac | |
| 35th Ave/Van Buren Street | Hayden High | |
| 27th Ave/Van Buren Street | Hayden High | |
| 19th Ave/Van Buren Street | Capitol Mall | |
| 15th Ave/Van Buren Street | Capitol Mall | |
| 7th Ave/Van Buren Street | Downtown | |
| Greg Stanton Central Station | Downtown | B Line (Valley Metro) |

== See also ==
- Public transport in Phoenix
