= Van Buren Street (Arizona) =

Major arterial street in Maricopa County

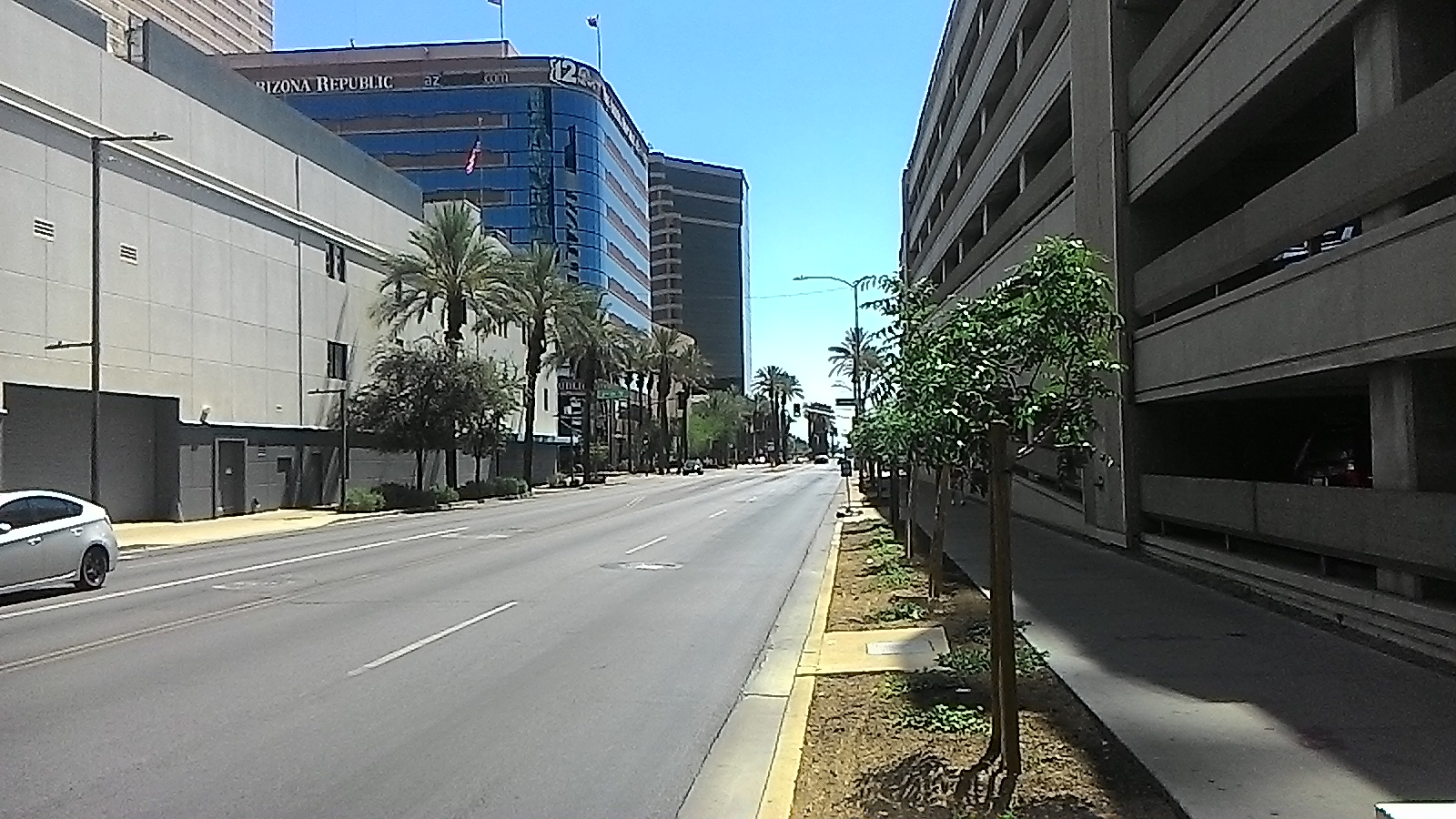
- Van Buren Street, 2nd St. in downtown Phoenix, facing east
- Namesake: Martin Van Buren
- Length: 30.2 mi (48.6 km)
- Location: Phoenix Metropolitan Area
- West end: 195th Avenue/Jackrabbit Trail
- East end: Priest Drive/Galvin Parkway/Mill Avenue

Van Buren Street is a major arterial street that runs through a number of municipalities in Maricopa County in the U.S. state of Arizona. At one point, the road was simultaneously the route of U.S. Route 60 (US 60), US 70, US 80, and US 89.

== History ==
Built after the founding of the city of Phoenix, the road was located outside of town in the 1880s. Following the expansion of the city northwards, the street became increasingly popular as people began to use it more and more. The routing of the Bankhead Highway, US 60, US 70, US 80, and US 89 also increased its popularity, turning the area into a center of life in the city. The demand for service on the street was so great that Arizona's first drive-in movie theater was sited on Van Buren, and motel owners introduced gimmicks to draw people to their attractions.

Following the completion of Interstate 10 to the south, the area became subject to urban decay, as the former U.S. Routes were removed from the system or rerouted around the street. This led to a decline in commerce in the area, and the eventual shuttering of many businesses on the street. This in turn led to an increase in crime and prostitution that has continued to this day.

In the years since its demise, there have been numerous attempts at improving the area. In Phoenix, the city has taken an active role in redeveloping the East Van Buren Corridor.

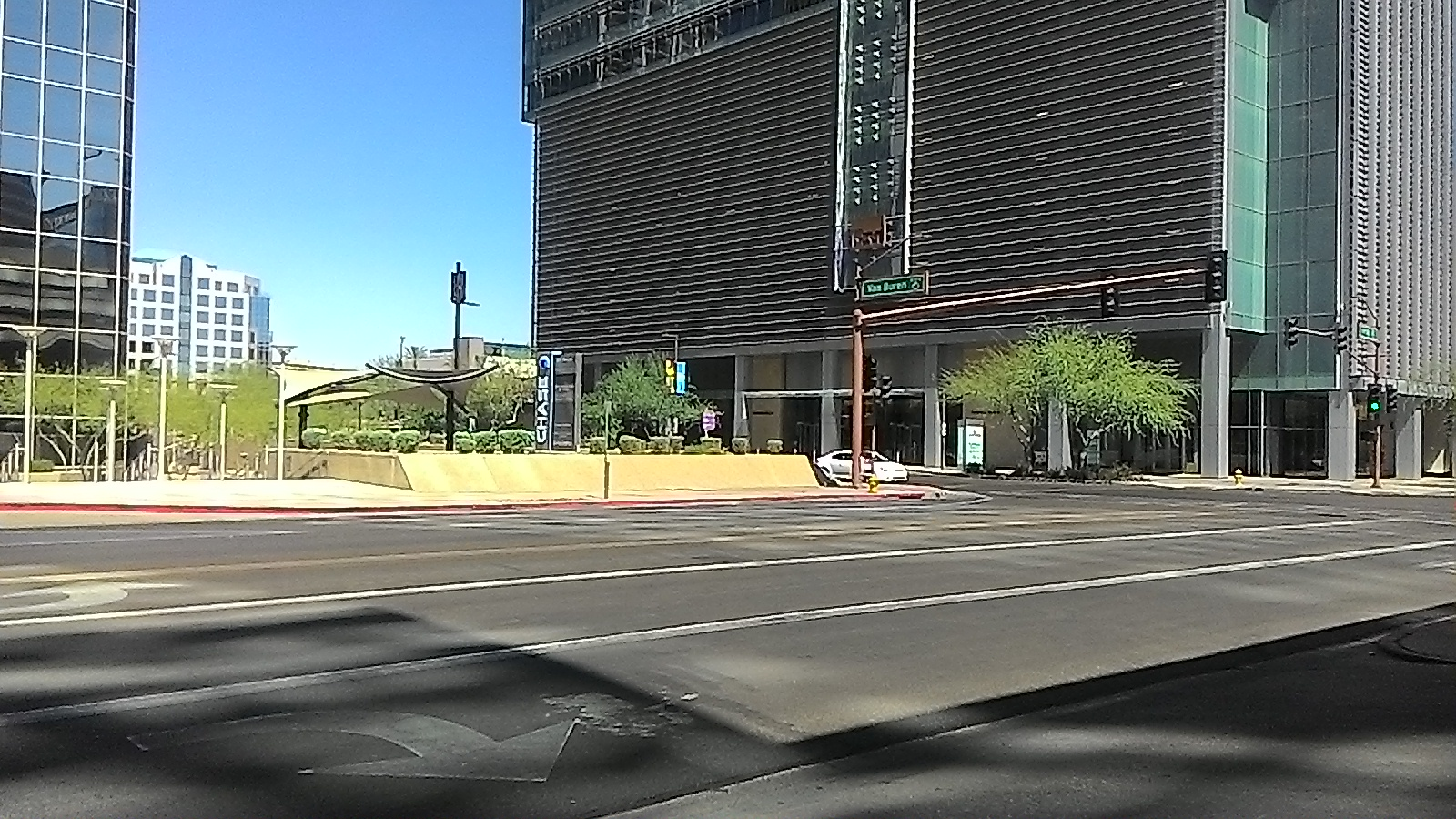
Van Buren Street, Phoenix, Arizona, near intersection of 2nd St., facing north

== Transportation ==
Valley Metro Bus's route 3 Van Buren Street primarily serves Van Buren Street, running on it from the Phoenix Zoo in east Phoenix's Papago Park to 4th Street in Avondale. Valley Metro Rail & Streetcar's B Line has stops here at 1st Avenue and Central Avenue.
