= Her Secret Is Patience =

Coordinates: 33°27′12″N 112°4′28″W

- Artist: Janet Echelman
- Year: 2009; 17 years ago
- Type: High-tenacity Polyester
- Location: Phoenix Civic Space Park; Phoenix, Arizona, United States

Her Secret Is Patience is a public art sculpture commission designed by artist Janet Echelman for the city of Phoenix. Its creation was the result of collaboration between the artist and a team of award-winning engineers, architects, planners, and fabricators. It is located downtown in the Civic Space Park across from the Walter Cronkite School of Journalism at Arizona State University. The sculpture consists of painted, galvanized steel; polyester twine netting; and colored lights. The piece cost $2.5 million. The title of the piece is a quote from Ralph Waldo Emerson and during construction it was unofficially titled Sky Bloom.

== Design ==
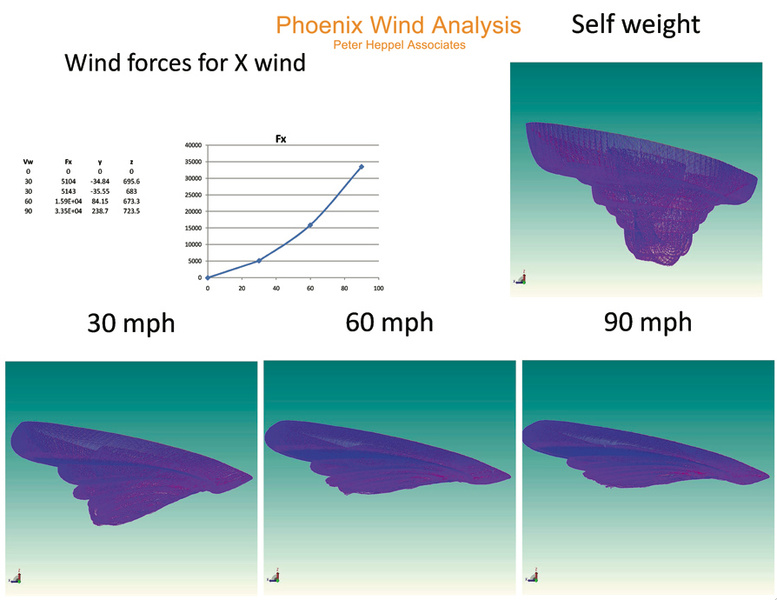
Her Secret Is Patience net wind simulation

The netting is 38 ft off the ground and 100 ft. tall and the three support poles are 102 ft, 125 ft. and 145 ft. tall. The netting is designed to show the movements of the wind. Its shape reflects Arizona's enormous cumulus clouds. At night, the colors gradually change with the seasons adding cool hues in the summer and warm hues in the winter.

The initial design process began with the creation of a three-dimensional computer model created using custom software. Those forms were then translated into CAD software in order to define the geometry and surfaces of the sculpture. These digital structures were then exported to a gravity and wind simulator in order to determine the necessary twine tenacity to withstand the desert winds. From this information, construction drawings were created which include specific looming patterns, color information, and lengths of meshes.

== Fabrication ==
The fabrication process involved several North American factories specializing in hand-craftsmanship. There are several layers of nets in the sculpture. The main body of colored net including the "wormhole" at the center, a structural net, which helps give the primary net its shape, and a cover net. The edge of every mesh is a different length, requiring the use of manual splicing on each joint. The two shortest steel support towers were shipped to the site complete; the third tower was shipped in halves, which were assembled and welded on-site. The suspension rings were created by a manufacturer specializing in fabricating roller coaster equipment. The rings hang concentrically 100 ft above the ground and are bound together with 1 in. diameter steel cable. The rings are secured to the base of each support tower with tie-down cables, which provide structural stability against strong winds and minimize ring movement.

The fabrication and engineering of the project was conducted by multiple firms.

- Net Engineering: Buro Happold (New York)
- Aeronautical Engineering: Peter Heppel Associates (Paris)
- Consultant: Speranza Architecture (New York)
- Lighting: VOX Arts (Baltimore, MD)
- Sculptural Foundations construction: Foresite Design (Berkley, MI)
- Fabrication & Project Engineering: CAID Industries (Tucson, AZ)
- Steel Structure and Foundation Engineering: M3 Engineering and Technology (Tucson, AZ)

== Repairs ==
The netting is required to be repaired roughly every 5 years, with the first repair taking place in December 2014. The existing netting is recycled and replaced with a new net and lighting. This process will need to continue on for the life of the sculpture. The cost of each net and its installation is currently unknown.

== Reception ==
Author Prof. Patrick Frank writes "...most Arizonans look on the work with pride: this unique visual delight will forever mark the city of Phoenix just as the Eiffel Tower marks Paris."

The Arizona Republic editorialized: "This is just what Phoenix need: a distinctive feature that helps create a real sense of place."

Some internet users have likened the sculpture to a jellyfish or a vagina. Others liken it to a floating used condom.

== Controversy ==
Some people have questioned the extremely high ($2.5 Million USD) cost of the project which was undertaken during the "Great Recession" More recently there have been question about the ongoing cost of the project which requires a new net to be constructed roughly every 5 years. The costs of replacing the nets has not been disclosed and this has led to fears of what the true cost of ownership for this project is in the long term. In addition the fact that the project was awarded to an out of state artist and the majority of fabrication and engineering was conducted by out of state firms has created discussions regarding the true positive local economic impact of such an expensive project.

== Awards ==
Best Public Art – Phoenix New Times
2009 Best of Phoenix 2009
Environmental Excellence Award – Valley Forward Association
2009 Art In Public Places
Award for Excellence in Structural Engineering – Structural Engineers Association of Arizona (SEAoA)
2008 M3 Engineering
