= B Line (Valley Metro) =

Light rail line in Phoenix, Arizona

- B Line at the Metro Parkway station

Overview
- Owner: Valley Metro
- Locale: Phoenix, Arizona
- Termini: Metro Parkway; Baseline/Central Avenue
- Stations: 29

Service
- System: Valley Metro Rail & Streetcar

History
- Opened: June 7, 2025

Technical
- Track gauge: 1,435 mm (4 ft 8 1/2 in) standard gauge
- Electrification: Overhead line, 750 V DC
Route map
B Line highlighted in orange

The B Line is a light rail line in Phoenix, Arizona. It is the north-south line operating as part of the Valley Metro Rail & Streetcar system. Service began on June 7, 2025. The line's inauguration introduced a new two-line system, whereas the system had previously operated with a single line. The B Line runs from Metro Parkway to Baseline/Central Avenue.

== Service description ==
Trains along the segment operate as a new line, originating at Baseline Road and running to the Downtown Phoenix Hub before taking over parts of the existing light rail system and continuing north to the terminus at Metro Parkway. An additional 17 light rail vehicles were purchased to accommodate the increase in runs.

The B Line starts in Phoenix on the east side of the former Metrocenter shopping mall at the Metro Parkway station. The rail line runs east on an elevated viaduct, crossing over Interstate 17. After the crossing, the line's alignment parallels Mountain View Road before turning south on 25th Street. The line runs south on 25th Street, crossing the Arizona Canal and passing by the Rose Mofford Sports Complex. It continues until it reaches Dunlap Avenue, where it swerves east on Dunlap, before turning south again on 19th Avenue for 4 miles (6.4 km). After three stops, it turns eastward again on Camelback Road for 2.5 miles (4.0 km), then turns south onto Central Avenue, where it continues into Downtown Phoenix. At Roosevelt Street, the line splits into one-way segments until Lincoln Street. Both track rejoins at Hadley Street. The rail line continues south under the Interstate 17, then Salt River bridge. The light rail line ends at an intersection with Baseline Road at Baseline/Central Avenue station station.

=== Hours and frequency ===
Time	4A	5A	6A	7A	8A-1P	2-6P	7P	8P-12A
Weekdays	12						20	
Saturdays	15						20	
Sundays/holidays	20							

=== Station listing ===
The following table lists the stations of the B Line, from north to south. All stations are located in the city of Phoenix, Arizona.

Station	Date opened	Neighborhood	Major connections and notes
Metro Parkway	January 27, 2024	Metro	Phoenix BRT (2030); Park and ride: 263 spaces
Mountain View/25th Avenue	January 27, 2024	Rose Mofford	
25th Avenue/Dunlap	January 27, 2024	Rose Mofford	
19th Avenue/Dunlap	Mar 19, 2016	Rose Mofford	Park and rideː 415
Northern/19th Avenue	Mar 19, 2016	Sunny High	
Glendale/19th Avenue	Mar 19, 2016	Glen	
Montebello/19th Avenue	Dec 27, 2008	Christown	Park and rideː 794
19th Avenue/Camelback	Dec 27, 2008	Cordova	Park and rideː 410
7th Avenue/Camelback	Dec 27, 2008	Uptown	Park and rideː 123
Central Avenue/Camelback	Dec 27, 2008	Uptown	Park and rideː 135
Campbell/Central Avenue	Dec 27, 2008	Uptown	
Indian School/Central Avenue	Dec 27, 2008	Uptown	
Osborn/Central Avenue	Dec 27, 2008	Midtown	
Thomas/Central Avenue	Dec 27, 2008	Midtown	
Encanto/Central Avenue	Dec 27, 2008	Midtown	
McDowell/Central Avenue	Dec 27, 2008	Downtown	
Roosevelt/Central Avenue	Dec 27, 2008	Downtown	
Van Buren/1st Avenue (southbound only)	Dec 27, 2008	Downtown	
Van Buren/Central Avenue (northbound only)	Dec 27, 2008	Downtown	Phoenix BRT (2030)
Washington/Central Avenue (mornings only)	Dec 27, 2008	Downtown	
Downtown Phoenix Hub	Dec 27, 2008	Downtown	A Line (Valley Metro)
Lincoln/1st Avenue (southbound only)	June 7, 2025	Downtown	
Lincoln/Central Avenue (northbound only)	June 7, 2025	Downtown	
Buckeye/Central Avenue	June 7, 2025	Lowell	
Pioneer/Central Avenue	June 7, 2025	Lowell	
Broadway/Central Avenue	June 7, 2025	Sunland	
Roeser/Central Avenue	June 7, 2025	Sunland	
Southern/Central Avenue	June 7, 2025	Sunland	Hope
Baseline/Central Avenue	June 7, 2025	Park and rideː 110	Hope

== History ==
The B Line north of Downtown Phoenix was largely constructed as part of the inaugural Valley Metro Rail system, which opened as far north as Montebello/19th Avenue station in 2006. Further extensions of the Northwest Extension Phase I and Northwest Extension Phase II in 2016 and 2024 brought the line's northern terminus to Metro Parkway station.

The South Central Extension expanded the B Line from Downtown Phoenix south along Central Avenue to Baseline Road, adding 5.5 miles (8.9 km) and eight stations to the Valley Metro Rail & Streetcar system, while connecting with two park and ride locations. The South Central Extension project also constructed a new central station in downtown Phoenix, centered on the block bounded by Central Avenue, First Avenue, Washington Street, and Jefferson Street. The Downtown Hub project gives Valley Metro additional flexibility for operating rail services, allowing trains to short turn in Downtown Phoenix during peak hours and special events.

After receiving environmental approval from the Federal Transit Administration (FTA) in January 2017, the project entered the design phase. Plans to reduce the number of general purpose lanes on Central from four to two to accommodate light rail tracks were initially met with backlash, and the city council's decision to proceed with initial plans prompted groups to initiate a ballot measure aimed at stopping all Valley Metro Rail & Streetcar funding (which ultimately failed). Construction began in 2019 and was completed in 2025, with the extension opening on June 7 the same year.
