= Arizona State University Downtown Phoenix campus =

Public university campus in Phoenix, Arizona, U.S.

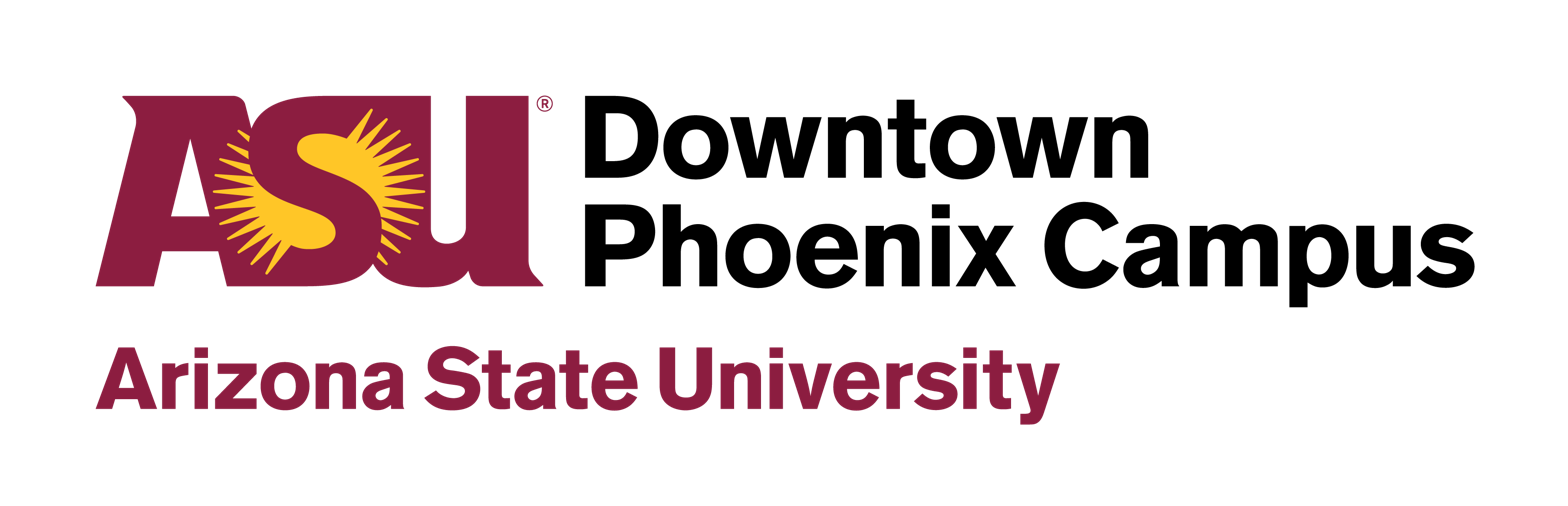
- Type: Campus of Arizona State University
- Established: 2006
- Students: 10,325 (Fall 2024)
- Location: Phoenix, Arizona, United States; 33°27′13.31″N 112°4′25.71″W
- Campus: Urban Downtown Phoenix: 27.57 acres (11.16 ha)
- Website: campus.asu.edu/downtown

Arizona State University Downtown Phoenix campus (ASU Downtown) is one of four campuses of Arizona State University, and is located in Phoenix, Arizona, United States.

The school was built in line with ASU President Michael M. Crow's "One University, Many Places" initiative and was built with cooperation from the state of Arizona and local governments.

== Campus ==
The campus is located in the downtown area of Phoenix, in an area bound by Van Buren Street, Fillmore Street, 3rd Avenue, and 7th Street. Classes began there in August 2006 with students from the College of Public Programs and College of Nursing attending classes there (in renovated existing office buildings adjacent to Arizona Center). The campus has expanded from its initial footprint.

The growth of the campus has been linked to the gentrification of Downtown Phoenix, Arizona. The movement of faculty, staff, and students to the downtown core has been linked to increases in rents and the out-migration of locals from the original communities. Following the COVID-19 pandemic, and the departure of many tenants of downtown high-rises, these concerns grew as the university aimed to acquire more space. Others remain concerned about the city of Phoenix financially supporting the endeavor.

== Academics ==
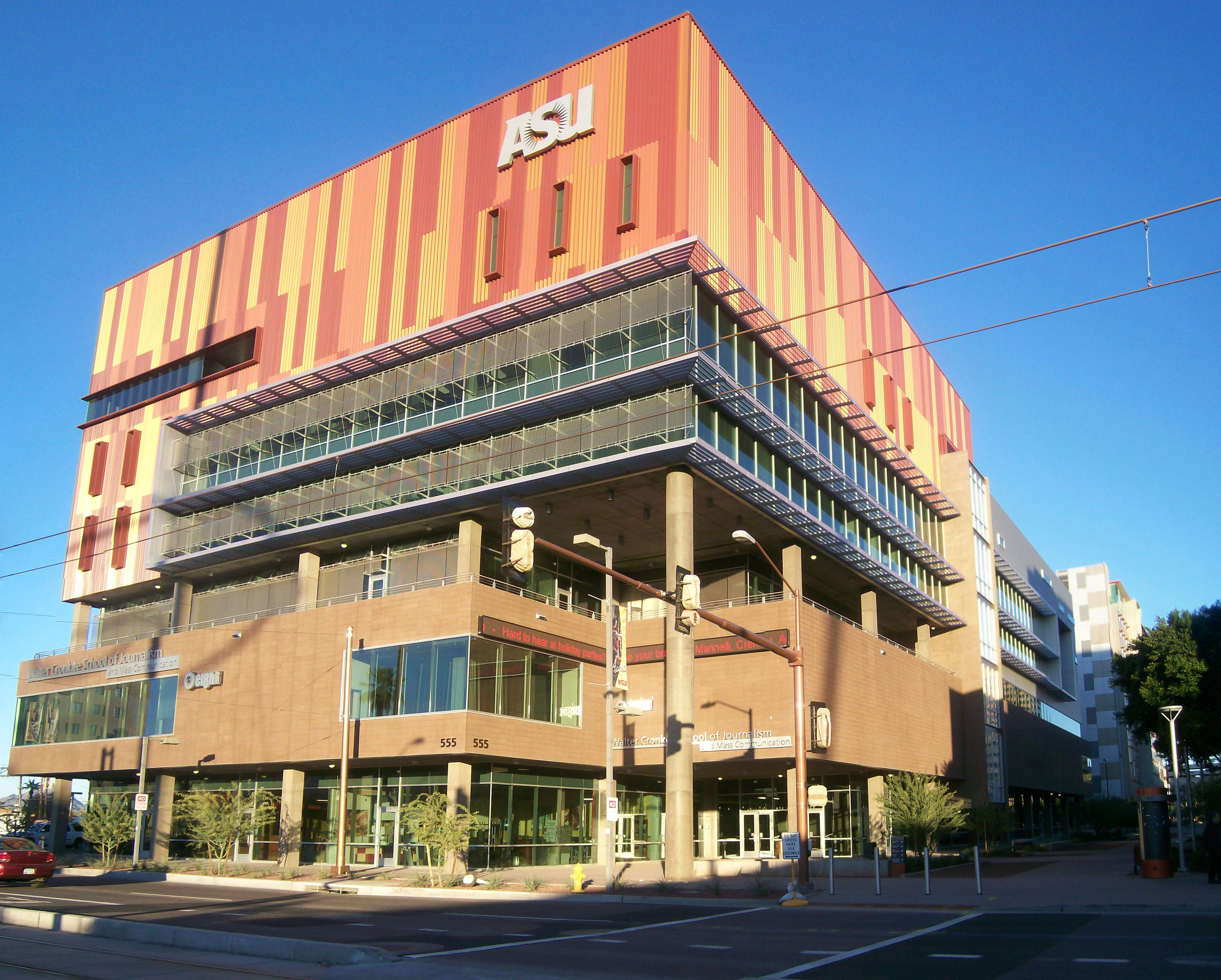
ASU Downtown Campus School of Journalism building

Initially the campus was meant to be the home of the health-related programs of Arizona State University, with the predecessor to the Edson College of Nursing & Health Innovation being the first college to relocate downtown. As Arizona State University continued to grow this plan was soon abandoned. Even so, the Arizona Biomedical Research Core remains adjacent to the campus.

=== Walter Cronkite School of Journalism and Mass Communication ===
In 2008, the Walter Cronkite School of Journalism and Mass Communication moved to ASU Downtown, with the headquarters and studios of KAET (the PBS member affiliate for the greater Phoenix area, operated by ASU) moving to ASU Downtown in 2009.

=== Watts College of Public Service and Community Solutions ===
The Watts College of Public Service and Community Solutions was one of the first colleges to relocate to the Downtown Phoenix Campus when it opened in 2006. The Watts College comprises four schools—Community Resources and Development, Criminology and Criminal Justice, Public Affairs and Social Work—as well as more than 20 research centers. The college's aim is to integrate teaching, research and systems-level thinking to address the most daunting challenges facing society. U.S. News & World Report ranks many of the college's academic programs in the top 20.

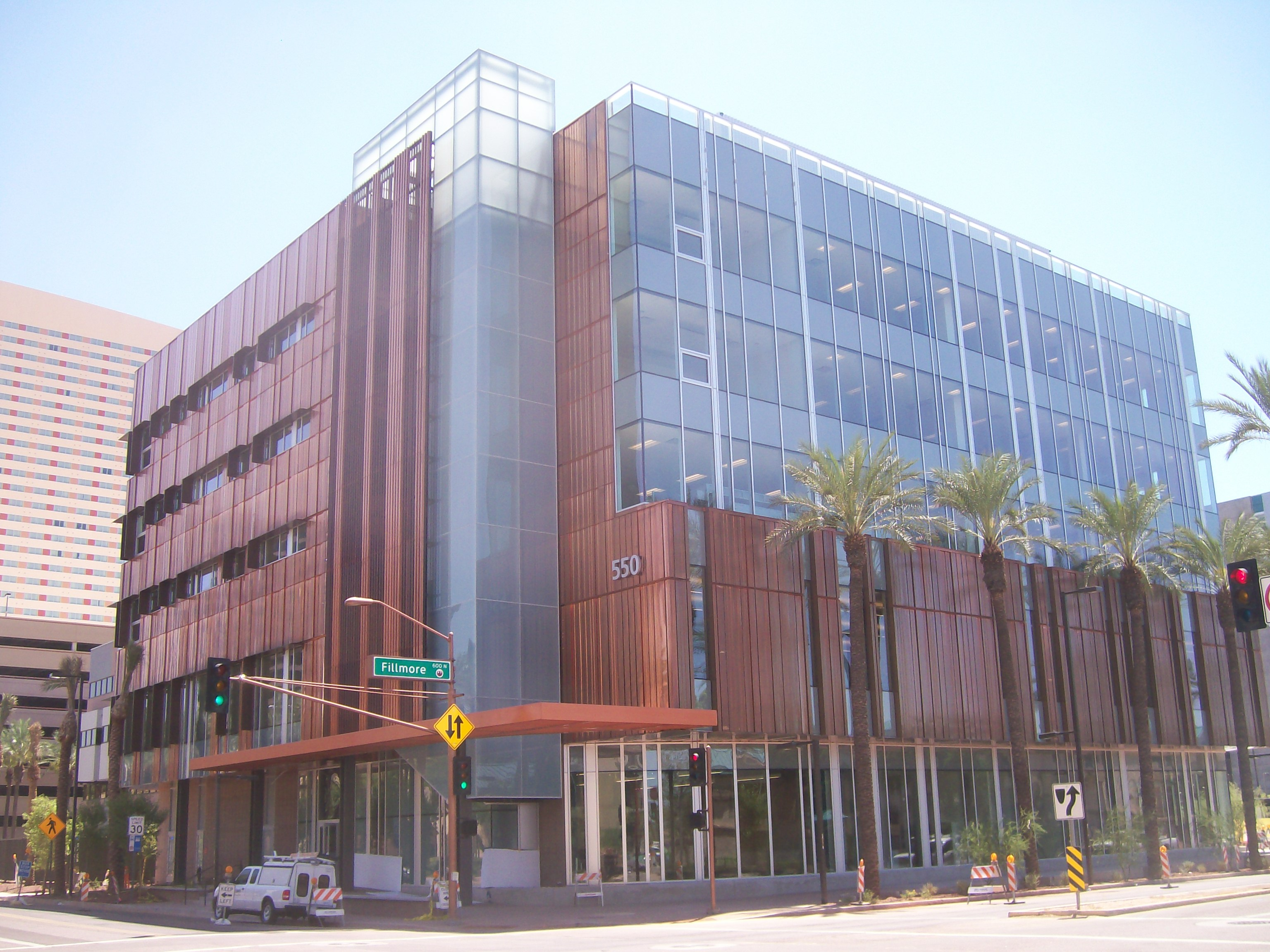
Health North building

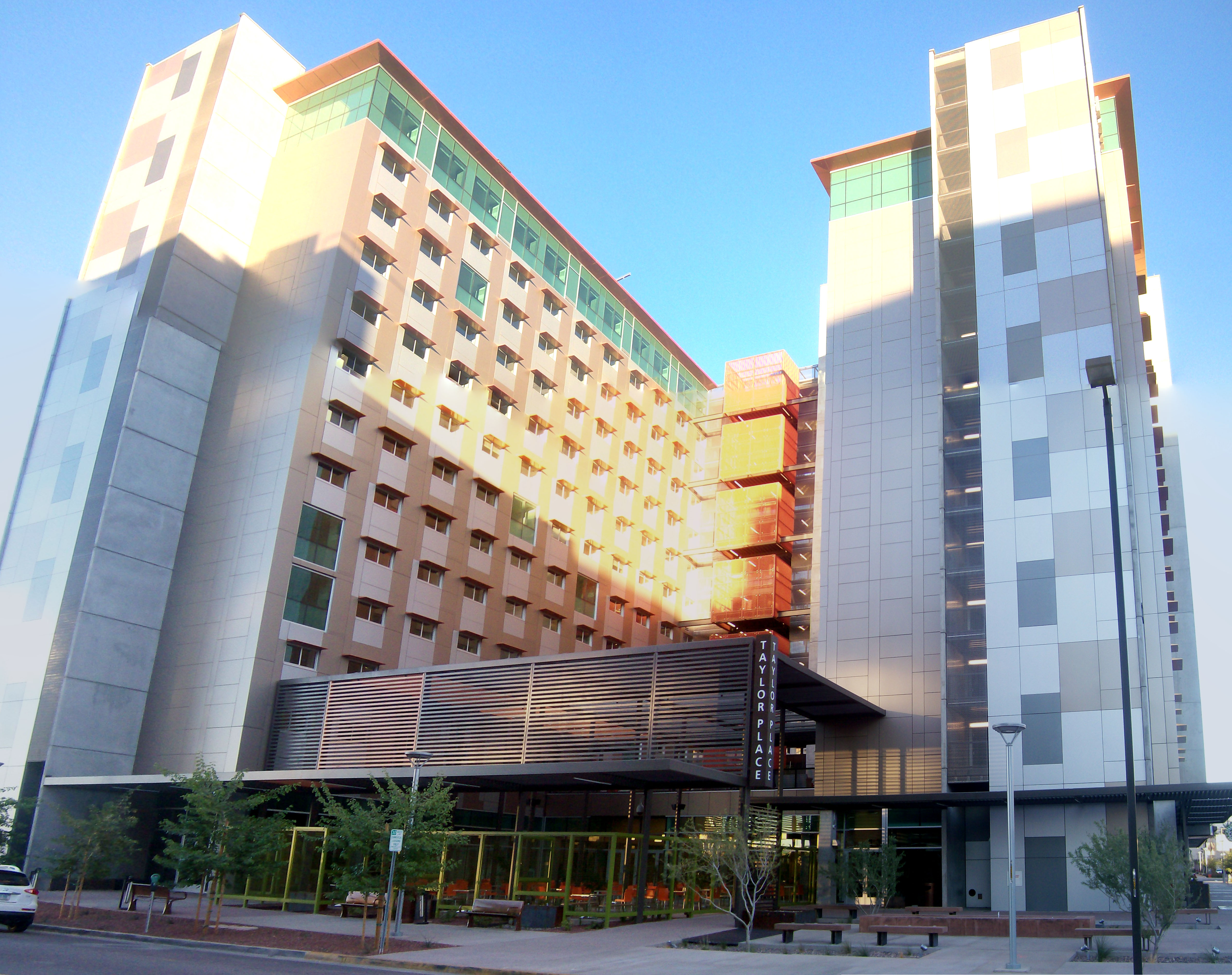
The Place dorms

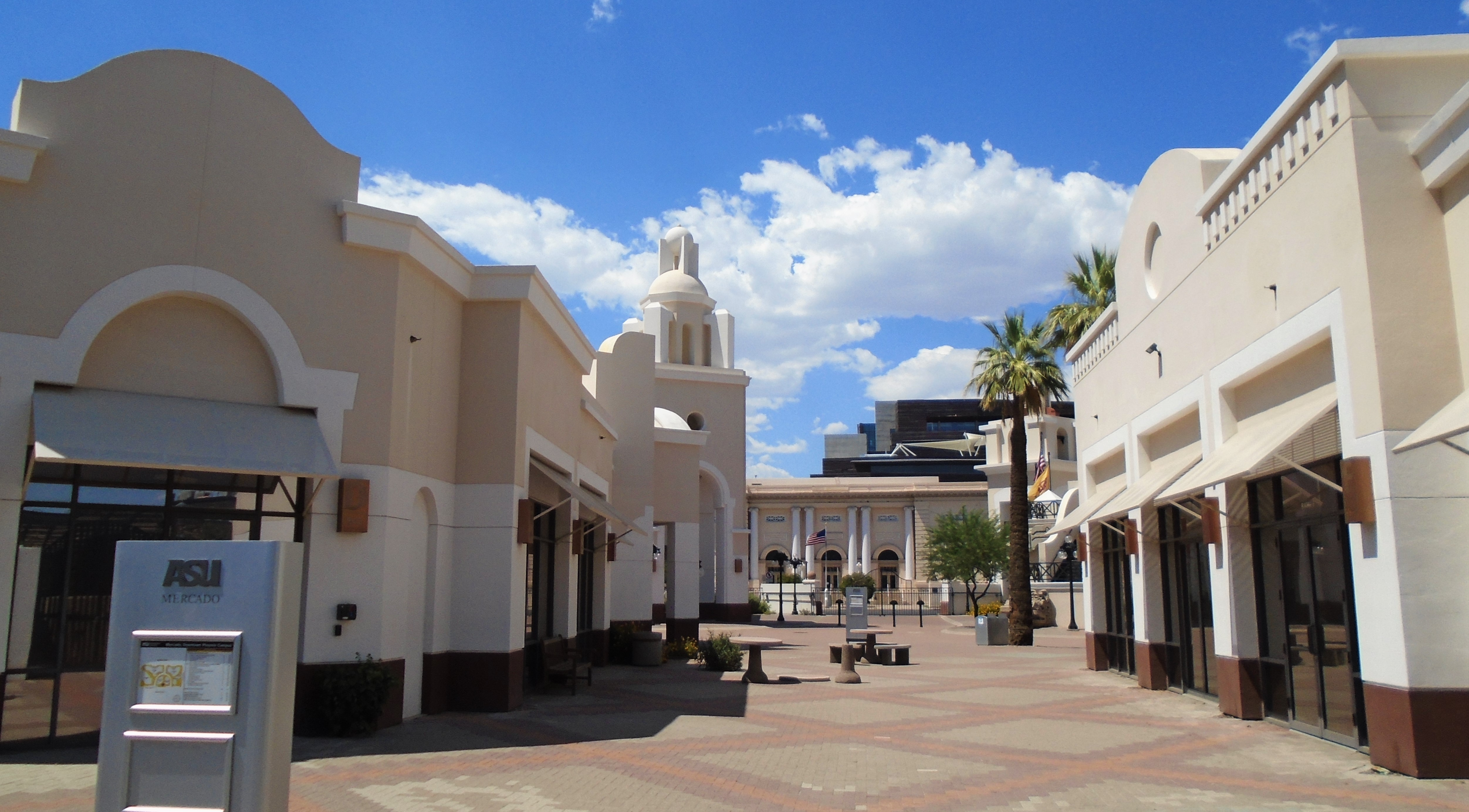
The Mercado buildings

=== Edson College of Nursing & Health Innovation ===
In August 2006, the College of Nursing & Health Innovation moved to the new Downtown Phoenix Campus. The new building, previously called Park Place, was a 1980s-era office building, and was extensively renovated to meet education and research requirements and renamed Health South. Shortly thereafter, Health North was constructed across the courtyard. The Edson College of Nursing and Health Innovation also maintains a presence in the Mercado Building, the Arizona Center, ASU West, and ASU Lake Havasu.

=== College of Health Solutions ===
The College of Health Solutions was formed in 2012 to help ASU marshal its resources to solve the national problem of poor health outcomes achieved at unsustainably high costs. The goals of the college are to simultaneously improve the patient care experience, improve the health of the population, and reduce per capita health care costs while improving health outcomes. The college also has a presence on the ASU Tempe, West, and Lake Havasu campuses, as well as online, and works closely with its industry and community partners.

=== College of Integrative Sciences and Arts ===
The College of Integrative Sciences and Arts, formerly the College of Letters and Sciences, is based on Arizona State University's Downtown Phoenix campus and offers the liberal arts core curriculum for the campus, as well as bachelor's degree programs in Communication, General Studies, and Interdisciplinary Studies. Instruction ranges from humanities, social sciences, and natural sciences. It also collaborates with other colleges and schools. The college also has a presence on the ASU Tempe, Polytechnic, and Online campuses.

=== Sandra Day O’Connor College of Law ===
The Sandra Day O'Connor College of Law has relocated to the Downtown Phoenix Campus. The university plans to establish the Arizona Center for Law and Society in 2016.

=== Mary Lou Fulton Teachers College ===
The Mary Lou Fulton Teachers College, offers programs leading to the B.A., M.Ed., and Ed.D. in many fields, such as early childhood education, elementary education, secondary education, special education, and educational administration/supervision. Mary Lou Fulton Teachers College administers teacher education programs across all four campuses of the university. making it among the largest higher education teacher preparation programs in the United States.

=== Graduate College ===
The Graduate College administers graduate programs on all four ASU campuses.

=== Barrett, The Honors College ===
Barrett, The Honors College provides academically intensive programs and courses for undergraduate students meeting select criteria. Barrett's programs are offered to students across all four ASU campuses.

=== Thunderbird School of Global Management ===
The Thunderbird School of Global Management offers courses and continuing education on global leadership, management, and business education.

== Residence Halls ==
- Gordon Commons (Formerly Taylor Place)
- Fusion On First
