= Valley Metro Bus =

Transit system in Maricopa County, Arizona

- Parent: Valley Metro
- Founded: 1993
- Headquarters: US Bank Center; Phoenix, Arizona, US
- Service area: Maricopa County; Ajo
- Service type: Local, express, shuttle, paratransit
- Routes: 104
- Hubs: 17
- Fleet: 1,061 buses
- Daily ridership: 92,400 (weekdays, Q2 2026)
- Annual ridership: 28,277,600 (2025)
- Fuel type: Diesel, diesel-electric hybrid, CNG, LNG
- Operator: See below
- Website: valleymetro.org

Valley Metro Bus is the public transit bus service in Maricopa County, Arizona, United States. Valley Metro Bus provides local, regional, express, and rural bus services in the Phoenix Metropolitan Area (as well as the community of Ajo in Pima County), covering a service area of 525 sq mi (1,360 km^{2}). In 2025, the system had a ridership of 28,277,600, or about 92,400 per weekday in the second quarter of 2026.

Valley Metro, officially known as the Valley Metro Regional Public Transportation Authority, is responsible for coordinating the bus system. Bus services are operated by private contractors and individual municipalities in the Phoenix area, branded as Valley Metro.

All Valley Metro Bus services are accessible to persons with disabilities, with ramps or lifts installed on all buses. Additionally, all fixed-route buses are equipped with bicycle racks.

== Operations ==
There are over 100 bus routes contracted by Valley Metro, including regular routes, limited-stop routes, and community circulators. Bus frequency, hours, and days of operation vary by route. The most heavily used routes have peak 10-minute frequency and run until 1:00 am, while less-used routes run every 30 minutes off-peak, ending at midnight.

=== Route types and naming conventions ===
As of 2026, sixty local bus routes form Valley Metro's super-grid bus system. They are numbered roughly according to the address on the Phoenix area's street grid on which they travel. For example:

- Route 35 is a north–south route which runs along 35th Avenue, which is the 3500 block, west, on the street grid.
- Route 0 runs north–south along Central Avenue, which is the dividing street or "zero point" separating east and west Phoenix on the street grid.
- Route 50 runs east–west along Camelback Road, which is the 5000 block, north, on the street grid
- Route 72 runs north–south along Scottsdale and Rural Roads, which are the 7200 block, east, on the street grid.
- Route 104 runs north–south along Alma School Road, which corresponds to the 10400 block, east, on the street grid (but not in the city of Mesa itself, which uses a different street numbering/zero point origin from the city of Phoenix).
- Routes 7 and 8 each run on 7th Street and 7th Avenue respectively. Given that Phoenix has numbered thoroughfares designated as "Avenues" west of Central and "Streets" east of Central, Route 8 is one digit higher to avoid confusion with Route 7 which are both the 700 blocks.
- Route 17 runs east–west along McDowell Road, which actually is the 1600 block, north, on the street grid. Route 17 is one digit higher to avoid confusion with Route 16, which runs north–south along 16th Street which is the 1600 block, east, on the street grid.
- Route 81 runs north–south on Hayden Road and McClintock Drive, which is the 8000 block, east, on the street grid. Route 81 is one digit higher to avoid confusion with Route 80, which runs east–west along Northern Avenue, which is the 8000 block, north, on the street grid.

The community circulator routes are free of charge except for the Avondale Zoom routes, each with a 50 cent fare; formerly the Glendale Urban Shuttle (GUS) routes had a 25 cent fare to ride, but this was dropped on October 23, 2017. They supplement the standard grid service with routes that connect neighborhoods to nearby business districts. The naming convention varies by the communities they serve, such as the Scottsdale Neighborhood Trolley, Tempe Orbit Jupiter, and Phoenix SMART.

The LINK routes were limited-stop, streamlined bus connections to transit centers served by Valley Metro Rail. These routes used upgraded bus shelters with illuminated "Next Bus" boards, and bus rapid transit-styled vehicles with traffic signal priority. They were named after the street they travel on. The two routes were the Main Street LINK and the Arizona Avenue LINK. LINK service was discontinued on October 24, 2016, and was replaced by enhanced local service on Routes 40 and 112.

The six RAPID routes are limited-stop commuter routes in the city of Phoenix that travel from Park and Ride lots in outlying neighborhoods near major freeways to RAPID stops in the downtown business core (including the Arizona State Capitol complex). These routes are mostly named for the freeway on which they travel, such as RAPID I-10 East and South Mountain RAPID routes (two routes connect newly developed neighborhoods along Baseline Road with downtown via 19th Avenue or 24th Street). They are unidirectional, traveling toward downtown in the morning and out of downtown in the afternoons, excluding the I-17 and I-10W routes, which have bi-directional service all day on weekdays.

The express routes are also limited-stop commuter routes with higher fares than standard routes, but the same routes and similar operation to RAPID, operating from outlying Park and Ride lots and pickup points in suburban areas outside the city of Phoenix. They are numbered in the 500s, with the second digit indicating the area they serve, using the following scheme:

- 51x – Scottsdale
- 52x – Tempe
- 53x – Mesa and Gilbert
- 54x – Chandler
- 56x – Southwest Valley (Avondale, Goodyear, Buckeye, and Tolleson)
- 57x – Northwest Valley (Glendale, Peoria, Surprise, and Sun Cities)

These routes are also unidirectional, traveling into downtown Phoenix and the State Capitol in the morning (using the major freeways after traveling on other streets for part of the trip) and out of downtown in the afternoons.

== Route list ==
Color key
Color	Operator	Note
Blue	Transdev-Phoenix	Formerly Veolia-Phoenix. Operates the North and South Phoenix facilities.
Peach	Transdev-Phoenix (formerly First Transit)	Operates the West Phoenix facility.
Pear	Dunn Transportation	Operations only, maintenance performed in-house.
Plum	Keolis-RPTA (formerly First Transit)	Operates the Mesa and Tempe facilities.
Purple	National Express (formerly Total Transit)	Contracted by the RPTA. Operated from the Total Transit facility in southeast Glendale.
Turquoise	City of Glendale	Only non-contracted routes in the system. Also operates Glendale Dial-a-Ride.
Brown	National Express (formerly Ajo Transportation)	Contracted by the RPTA.

Routes marked with an asterisk (*) are a part of the Frequent Bus Network (15 minute-or-better headways on weekdays from 6 a.m. to 6 p.m.):

No.	Name	Type	Terminals		Annual ridership (FY2025)	Note
0*	Central Ave	Local	Sunnyslope; Sunnyslope Transit Center	South Mountain Heights; S Central Av & Dobbins Rd	419,687 ▲12% (Note: Includes ridership from 0A, which was merged with 0 in July 2025.)	
0*	Central Ave	Local	Sunnyslope; Sunnyslope Transit Center	South Mountain Heights; S Central Av & Baseline Rd	419,687 ▲12%	Alternate weekday daytime trips
1	Washington St	Local	East Phoenix; Priest Drive/Washington station	Central City; Central Station	71,924 ▼ -3.7%	
3*	Van Buren St	Local	Camelback East; Phoenix Zoo	Avondale; La Canada Bl & 4th St (weekdays and Saturdays)	843,211 ▲15%	No service east of Galvin Parkway when Phoenix Zoo is closed.
3*	Van Buren St	Local	Camelback East; Phoenix Zoo	Tolleson; Van Buren St & 83rd Av (Alternate Saturday trips and Sundays)	843,211 ▲15%	No service east of Galvin Parkway when Phoenix Zoo is closed.
3*	Van Buren St	Local	Camelback East; Van Buren St & 44th St	West Phoenix; Van Buren St & 35th Av	843,211 ▲15%	Alternate weekday daytime trips
7*	7th St	Local	Deer Valley; Deer Valley Rd & 19th Av	South Mountain Heights; 7th St & Dobbins Rd	763,664 ▲3.9%	
7*	7th St	Local	North Mountain Village; 7th St & Dunlap Rd	South Mountain Village; 7th St & Baseline Rd	763,664 ▲3.9%	Alternate weekday daytime trips
8	7th Ave	Local	Sunnyslope; Sunnyslope Transit Center	South Mountain Heights; Baseline Rd & Central Av	330,895 ▼ -2.3%	
10	Roosevelt St	Local	East Phoenix; 32nd St & Roosevelt St	Central City; Central Station	94,618 ▼ -2.8%	
12	12th St	Local	Sunnyslope; Sunnyslope Transit Center	Central City; Jefferson St & 12th St	201,254 ▲4.1%	
13	Buckeye Rd	Local	Central City; 24th Street SkyTrain station	Estrella Village; Buckeye Rd & 75th Av	257,030 ▲5.4%	
15	15th Ave	Local	Alhambra; Montebello/19th Avenue station	Central City South; 15th Av & Pima St	187,869 ▼ -0.5%	
16*	16th St	Local	Paradise Valley North; Paradise Valley Community College	South Mountain Heights; Dobbins Rd & Central Av	658,454 ▲4.1%	
16*	16th St	Local	Camelback East; 16th St & Northern Av	South Mountain Village; 16th St & Baseline Rd	658,454 ▲4.1%	Alternate weekday trips
17	McDowell Rd	Local	Scottsdale; McDowell Rd & Pima Rd	Goodyear; McDowell Rd & Pebble Creek Pkwy (weekdays and Saturdays)	1,019,064 ▲11%	Alternate weekday trips run between 43rd Avenue and 44th Street; Alternate weekday midday trips from Pima Road run to/from 83rd Avenue
17	McDowell Rd	Local	Scottsdale; McDowell Rd & Pima Rd	Tolleson; McDowell Rd & 99th Av (Alternate Saturday trips and Sundays)	1,019,064 ▲11%	Alternate weekday trips run between 43rd Avenue and 44th Street; Alternate weekday midday trips from Pima Road run to/from 83rd Avenue
19*	19th Ave	Local	Norterra; Happy Valley Rd & 23rd Av	Laveen Village; 27th Avenue/Baseline P&R	1,198,056 ▼ -0.6%	
27	27th Ave	Local	Deer Valley; 23rd Av & Rose Garden Ln	Estrella Village; Lower Buckeye Rd & 27th Av	703,678 ▲7.5%	Every other rush hour trip & all off-peak trips alternate between 23rd Av-Rose Garden La and 27th Av-Deer Valley Rd; Alternate rush hour trips run south of Bell Road
27	27th Ave	Local	Deer Valley; 27th Av & Deer Valley Rd	Estrella Village; Lower Buckeye Rd & 27th Av	703,678 ▲7.5%	Every other rush hour trip & all off-peak trips alternate between 23rd Av-Rose Garden La and 27th Av-Deer Valley Rd; Alternate rush hour trips run south of Bell Road
28	Lower Buckeye Rd	Local	Bradley Ranch; 22nd Av & Lower Buckeye Rd	South Tolleson; Lower Buckeye Rd & 99th Av	103,272 ▼ -4%	
29*	Thomas Rd	Local	Scottsdale; Pima Park	Maryvale Village; Thomas Rd & 93rd Av	1,222,536 ▲15%	
29*	Thomas Rd	Local	Camelback East Village; Thomas Rd & 44th St	Maryvale Village; Desert Sky Transit Center	1,222,536 ▲15%	Alternate weekday daytime trips
30	University Dr	Local	Mesa; University Dr & Power Rd	South Mountain Heights; 24th Street/Baseline P&R	443,902 ▲15.3%	Terminates at SMCC during school hours
32	32nd St/40th St	Local	Camelback East; 28th St & Camelback Rd	South Mountain Heights; Baseline Rd & 40th St	346,437 ▲7.8%	
35*	35th Ave	Local	Norterra; Happy Valley Rd & 23rd Av	South Mountain Heights; 27th Avenue/Baseline P&R	950,286 ▲3.4%	
35*	35th Ave	Local	North Mountain Village; Thelda Williams Transit Center	Estrella Village; 35th Av & Lower Buckeye Rd	950,286 ▲3.4%	Alternate weekday trips
39	North 40th St	Local	Paradise Valley North; Paradise Valley Community College	Paradise Valley Village; Dreamy Draw P&R	43,435 ▲3.9%	
40*	Main St	Local	Mesa; Sycamore/Main station	Superstition Springs; Superstition Springs Transit Center	289,428 ▼ -5.6%	
40*	Main St	Local	Mesa; Gilbert/Main station	Superstition Springs; Superstition Springs Transit Center	289,428 ▼ -5.6%	Alternate weekday daytime trips
41*	Indian School Rd	Local	Scottsdale; Indian School Rd & Granite Reef Rd	Villa de Paz; Indian School Rd & 107th Av	1,018,855 ▲10.8%	
41*	Indian School Rd	Local	Arcadia Lite; Indian School Rd & 32nd St	Maryvale Village; Indian School Rd & 59th Av	1,018,855 ▲10.8%	Alternate weekday daytime trips
43	43rd Ave	Local	Deer Valley; Union Hills Dr & 43rd Av	Estrella Village; Lower Buckeye Rd & 43rd Av	398,884 ▲16.1%	
44	44th St/Tatum Blvd	Local	Desert Ridge; Desert Ridge Marriott	Central City; 44th Street/Washington station	366,442 ▼ -3%	
45	Broadway Rd	Local	Superstition Springs; Superstition Springs Transit Center	South Mountain Village; 19th Av & Broadway Rd	653,041 ▲24.5%	Alternate rush hour trips run west of Price Road
48	48th St	Local	Mesa Grande; Mesa Riverview	South Tempe; Priest Dr & Baseline Rd at Arizona Mills	119,100 ▲23.7%	
50*	Camelback Rd	Local	Scottsdale; Scottsdale Community College	Camelback Ranch; 107th Av & Camelback Rd	981,655 ▼ -0.9%	
50*	Camelback Rd	Local	Camelback East Village; Camelback Rd & 44th St	Glendale; Camelback Rd & 67th Av	981,655 ▼ -0.9%	Alternate weekday daytime trips
51	51st Ave	Local	North Mountain Village; Arizona State University West campus	Laveen Village; 51st Ave & Baseline Rd	451,489 ▲14.7%	Trips alternate between each southern termini.
51	51st Ave	Local	North Mountain Village; Arizona State University West campus	Komatke; Pecos Rd & 51st Ave via Komatke Health Center	451,489 ▲14.7%	Trips alternate between each southern termini.
52	Roeser Rd	Local	Patio Homes East; 48th St & Roeser Rd	Park Phoenix; 19th Av & Roeser Rd	77,776 ▼ -7.3%	
56	Priest Dr	Local	Camelback East; Desert Botanical Garden	Foothills Park Place; Ray Rd & 48th St	282,834 ▲27.4%	Alternate rush hour trips run between Elliot Road and Washington Street; No service north of Washington Street when Desert Botanical Garden is closed
59	59th Ave	Local	Glendale; 59th Av & Beardsley Rd	Freeport Center; 59th Av & Buckeye Rd	327,114 ▲16.9%	
60	Bethany Home Rd	Local	Biltmore; Camelback Rd & 24th St	Glendale; 83rd Av & Bethany Home Rd	308,258 ▼ -5.8%	
61	Southern Ave	Local	Superstition Springs; Superstition Springs Transit Center	Laveen Village; 51st Av & Southern Av	955,298 ▲21.8%	
62	Hardy Dr	Local	Tempe; Tempe Marketplace	South Tempe; Ruby Dr & IKEA	220,057 ▲16.6%	
66	Mill Ave/Kyrene Rd	Local	Tempe; Tempe Transit Center	Gila River Indian Community; Lone Butte Casino	223,247 ▲19.6%	Alternate rush hour trips run north of Elliot Road
67	67th Ave	Local	Arrowhead Ranch; Union Hills Dr & 67th Av	Sierra Vista; Sierra Linda High School	264,465 ▲9.1%	
70*	24th St/Glendale Ave	Local	Glendale; Luke Air Force Base	South Mountain Heights; 24th Street/Baseline P&R	1,078,617 ▲6.9%	Select weekday trips run east of Glendale P&R
70*	24th St/Glendale Ave	Local	Alhambra/Glendale; Glendale Av & 43rd Av	South Mountain Heights; 24th Street/Baseline P&R	1,078,617 ▲6.9%	Alternate trips
72	Scottsdale Rd/Rural Rd	Local	Grayhawk; HonorHealth Scottsdale Thompson Peak Medical Center	Chandler; Chandler Fashion Center	765,220 ▲22.1%	
75	75th Ave	Local	Maryvale Village; Camelback Rd & 75th Av	Tuscano; Lower Buckeye Rd & 75th Av	118,773 ▲1.7%	
77	Baseline Rd	Local	Mesa; West Mesa P&R	Laveen Ranch; Gila River Indian Community Service Center	598,400 ▲42%	Serves SMCC during school hours
80	Northern Ave/Shea Blvd	Local	Scottsdale; Mustang Transit Center	Glendale; 59th Av & Northern Av	328,517 ▼ -0.7%	
81	Hayden Rd/McClintock Dr	Local	Scottsdale; Mustang Transit Center	Chandler; Chandler Fashion Center (weekdays and Saturdays)	443,022 ▲22.1%	Alternate rush hour trips run between Tempe Marketplace and ASU Research Park; No Sunday service south of Warner Road (all trips run to/from ASU Research Park)
81	Hayden Rd/McClintock Dr	Local	Scottsdale; Mustang Transit Center	Tempe; ASU Research Park	443,022 ▲22.1%	Alternate rush hour trips run between Tempe Marketplace and ASU Research Park; No Sunday service south of Warner Road (all trips run to/from ASU Research Park)
83	83rd Ave	Local	Glendale; Arrowhead Towne Center	Tolleson; 83rd Av & Van Buren St	184,537 ▲10.8%	
90	Dunlap Ave/Cave Creek Rd	Local	Paradise Valley Village; Rose Garden Ln & Cave Creek Rd	Glendale; 67th Av & Olive Av	425,114 ▼ -3.9%	
96	Dobson Rd	Local	Mesa Grande; Mesa Riverview	Silverton Ranch; Dobson Rd & Pecos Rd (weekdays and Saturdays)	241,895 ▲2.5%	Rush hour trips alternate between and Snedigar Sports Complex and Baseline Road; No Sunday service south of Baseline Road
96	Dobson Rd	Local	Mesa Grande; Mesa Riverview	Dobson Ranch; Dobson Rd & Baseline Rd	241,895 ▲2.5%	Rush hour trips alternate between and Snedigar Sports Complex and Baseline Road; No Sunday service south of Baseline Road
96	Dobson Rd	Local	Mesa Grande; Mesa Riverview	South Chandler; Snedigar Sports Complex (rush hours)	241,895 ▲2.5%	Rush hour trips alternate between and Snedigar Sports Complex and Baseline Road; No Sunday service south of Baseline Road
104	Alma School Rd	Local	Mesa Grande; Mesa Riverview	Chandler; Morelos St & Hamilton St (weekdays)	141,832 ▼ -2.8%	
104	Alma School Rd	Local	Mesa Grande; Mesa Riverview	Fiesta District; Alma School Rd & Southern Av (weekends)	141,832 ▼ -2.8%	
106	Peoria Ave	Local	Sunnyslope; Sunnyslope Transit Center	Sun City; Santa Fe Dr & 105th Ave (weekdays)	352,724 ▲4.5%	
106	Peoria Ave	Local	Sunnyslope; Sunnyslope Transit Center	Sun City/Peoria; Peoria Av & 99th Av (weekends)	352,724 ▲4.5%	
108	Elliot Rd/48th St	Local	Superstition Springs; Superstition Springs Transit Center	Ahwatukee Foothills Village; Chandler Blvd & 48th St	164,515 ▼ -0.1%	
112*	Country Club Dr/Arizona Ave	Local	North Center Neighborhood; Center St & McKellips Rd	Chandler; Chandler P&R	536,676 ▲1.7%	
112*	Country Club Dr/Arizona Ave	Local	Mesa; Center/Main station	Chandler; Chandler P&R	536,676 ▲1.7%	Alternate weekday daytime trips
120	Mesa Dr	Local	Escobodo Neighborhood District; Fitch Park	Mesa; Lewis Ct & Coury Av	94,306 ▲1.9%	
122	Cactus Rd	Local	North Mountain Village; 19th Avenue/Dunlap station	Glendale; ASU Western Campus	105,078 ▼ -10.5%	
128	Stapley Dr	Local	North Mesa; McKellips Rd & Stapley Dr	Mesa; Inverness Av & Stapley Dr	90,101 ▲0.4%	
136	Gilbert Rd	Local	Lehi Community Improvement; Gilbert-McDowell P&R	Chandler; Gilbert Rd & Ryan Rd (weekdays and Saturdays)	183,339 ▼ -1%	
136	Gilbert Rd	Local	Lehi Community Improvement; Gilbert-McDowell P&R	Mesa/Gilbert; Gilbert Rd & Baseline Rd (Sundays)	183,339 ▼ -1%	
138	Thunderbird Rd	Local	Paradise Valley Village; Thunderbird Rd & 32nd St	Sun City; Santa Fe Dr & 105th Ave	288,373 ▲4.8%	
140	Ray Rd	Local	Gilbert; Ray Rd & Gilbert Rd	Foothills Park Place; Ray Rd & 48th St	67,592 ▲12.4%	No Sunday service
154	Greenway Rd	Local	Paradise Valley Village; Scottsdale P&R	Sunburst Farms; 51st Av & Greenway Rd	243,979 ▼ -5.2%	
156	Chandler Blvd	Local	Mesa; Arizona State University Polytechnic campus	Ahwatukee Foothills Village; Chandler Blvd & 48th St	244,543 ▲15.5%	Alternate rush hour trips run west of McQueen Road
170	Bell Rd	Local	Northsight; Raintree Dr & Northsight Blvd	Glendale; Arrowhead Towne Center	550,032 ▲1.8%	
184	Power Rd	Local	Mesa; Power Road P&R	Mesa; ASU Polytechnic Campus via Phoenix-Mesa Gateway Airport	87,758 ▲1%	
186	Union Hills Dr/Mayo Blvd	Local	Windsong; Mayo Blvd & Scottsdale Rd	Glendale; Arrowhead Towne Center	193,123 ▲3.1%	
186	Union Hills Dr/Mayo Blvd	Local	Windsong; Mayo Blvd & Scottsdale Rd	Glendale; Union Hills Dr & 51st Av	193,123 ▲3.1%	Alternate trips
514	Scottsdale	Express	Central City; 17th Ave & State Capitol (last drop-off); Jefferson St & 18th Ave (first pickup)	Scottsdale; Mustang Transit Center	2,985 ▲10.4%	
521	Central Tempe	Express	Central City; 17th Ave & State Capitol (last drop-off); Jefferson St & 18th Ave (first pickup)	South Tempe; Tempe Library P&R	8,784 ▲8.3%	
522	South Tempe	Express	Central City; 17th Ave & State Capitol (last drop-off); Jefferson St & 18th Ave (first pickup)	South Tempe; Tempe Sports Complex	7,666 ▼ -0.6%	
531	Mesa/Gilbert	Express	Central City; 17th Ave & State Capitol (last drop-off); Jefferson St & 18th Ave (first pickup)	Gilbert; Gilbert Rd & Houston Av	15,865 ▲2.7%	
533	Mesa	Express	Central City; 17th Ave & State Capitol (last drop-off); Jefferson St & 18th Ave (first pickup)	Superstition Springs; Superstition Springs TC	22,803 ▲4.6%	
535	Northeast Mesa	Express	Central City; 17th Ave & State Capitol (last drop-off); Jefferson St & 18th Ave (first pickup)	Mesa; Power Rd P&R	20,971 ▲5.5%	
542	Chandler	Express	Central City; 17th Ave & State Capitol (last drop-off); Jefferson St & 18th Ave (first pickup)	Chandler; Chandler P&R	35,995 ▲4.1%	
562	Goodyear	Express	Central City; 17th Ave & State Capitol (last drop-off); Jefferson St & 18th Ave (first pickup)	Goodyear; Goodyear P&R	16,453 ▲66.9%	
563	Avondale/Buckeye	Express	Central City; 17th Ave & State Capitol (last drop-off); Jefferson St & 18th Ave (first pickup)	Buckeye; Buckeye P&R	17,266 ▲22.5%	
571	Surprise	Express	Central City; Adams St & 17th Ave (last drop-off); Jefferson St & 18th Ave (first pickup)	Surprise; Surprise P&R	13,016 ▲27.4%	
573	West Glendale	Express	Central City; 17th Ave & State Capitol (last drop-off); Jefferson St & 18th Ave (first pickup)	Glendale; Glendale P&R	6,573 ▲8.4%	
575	North Glendale	Express	Central City; Central Station (last drop-off); Van Buren St & 1st St (first pickup)	Glendale; Arrowhead Towne Center	9,801 ▲10.2%	
685	Gila Bend Regional Connector	Rural Route	Maryvale Village; Desert Sky Transit Center	Ajo; Esperanza Ave & Telera St	10,641 ▲33.6%	No Sunday service
GL	Grand Avenue Limited	Express	Central City; Central Station	Peoria; Peoria P&R @ Old Town	4,253 ▼ -17.7%	Provides express service, but with a local fare.
GUS 1	Glendale Urban Shuttle 1	Circulator			74,737 ▲15.2%	
GUS 2	Glendale Urban Shuttle 2	Circulator			74,737 ▲15.2%	
GUS 3	Glendale Urban Shuttle 3	Circulator			74,737 ▲15.2%	
DBUZ	Mesa Downtown BUZZ	Circulator	Mesa Grande; Mesa Riverview	Mesa; 1st St & Centennial Way	140,766 ▲14%	No Sunday service
FBUZ	Mesa Fiesta BUZZ	Circulator	Mesa Grande; Mesa Riverview	Fiesta District; Southern Ave & Alma School Rd	182,633 ▲16.4%	Also serves Sycamore/Main Street station; No Sunday service
ALEX	Phoenix Neighborhood Circulator – ALEX (Ahwatukee)	Circulator	Ahwatukee; 51st St & Elliot Rd	Foothills; Desert Foothills Pkwy & Liberty Ln	32,263 ▼ -12.2%	Select trips serve 40th St/Pecos Rd PNR
DASH	Phoenix Neighborhood Circulator – DASH (Gov. Loop)	Circulator	Governmental Mall; 19th Ave and Jefferson St	Central City; Central Station	132,150 ▲15.8%	No weekend service
MARY	Phoenix Neighborhood Circulator – MARY (Maryvale)	Circulator	Maryvale Village; Desert Sky Transit Center		58,498 ▲22.1%	Bidirectional loop route that serves Maryvale Village neighborhoods
SMART	Phoenix Neighborhood Circulator – SMART (Sunnyslope)	Circulator	Sunnyslope; 19th Ave & Cholla St	Sunnyslope; 15th St & Cinnabar Ave	99,379 ▲0.7%	Serves Sunnyslope Transit Center
68CM	Scottsdale 68th Street/Camelback Trolley	Circulator	Scottsdale; Hayden Rd & Indian School Rd	Scottsdale; Granite Reef Senior Center	160,715 ▲20.4%	No weekend service
MLHD	Scottsdale Miller/Hayden Trolley	Circulator	Scottsdale; Mustang Transit Center	Scottsdale; Granite Reef Senior Center	118,887 ▲16.1%	No weekend service
OLDT	Scottsdale Old Town Trolley	Circulator				
MSTG	Scottsdale Mustang Trolley	Circulator	Northsight; Raintree Dr & Northsight Blvd	Scottsdale Ranch; Via Linda Senior Center	54,332 ▲13.2%	Serves Mustang Transit Center; No weekend service
FLSH	FLASH Forward (Arizona State University)	Circulator			40,305 ▼ -24.4%	Both routes part of bi-directional services around Downtown Tempe and Arizona State University Tempe Campus; No weekend service
FLSH	FLASH Back (Arizona State University)	Circulator			40,305 ▼ -24.4%	Both routes part of bi-directional services around Downtown Tempe and Arizona State University Tempe Campus; No weekend service
EART	Tempe – Orbit Earth	Circulator	Tempe; Tempe Transit Center	Tempe; Tempe Marketplace	249,585 ▼ -2.6%	
JUPI	Tempe – Orbit Jupiter	Circulator	Tempe; Tempe Transit Center	Tempe; McClintock High School	364,509 ▲0.4%	Originally one bi-directional route split into two
MARS	Tempe – Orbit Mars	Circulator	Tempe; Tempe Transit Center	Tempe; Southern Ave & Evergreen Rd	544,892 ▼ -1%	Originally one bi-directional route split into two
MERC	Tempe – Orbit Mercury	Circulator	Tempe; Tempe Transit Center	Tempe; Escalante Community Center	382,955 ▼ -9.6%	
VENU	Tempe – Orbit Venus	Circulator	Tempe; Tempe Transit Center		318,951 ▼ -6.5%	
STRN	Tempe – Orbit Saturn	Circulator	Tempe; Tempe Public Library	South Tempe; Priest Dr & Elliot Rd	117,514 ▲10.8%	
SR-51 (400)	SR-51 Rapid	Rapid	Central City; 17th Ave & State Capitol (last drop-off); Jefferson St & 18th Ave (first pickup)	Desert Ridge; Deer Valley Rd & Marriott Dr	32,813 ▼ -1.3%	Short trips serve Dreamy Draw P&R and SR-51/Bell Rd P&R
I-10E (450)	I-10 East Rapid	Rapid	Central City; 17th Ave & State Capitol (last drop-off); Jefferson St & 18th Ave (first pickup)	Ahwatukee; 40th St/Pecos Rd P&R	26,229 ▼ -20.5%	
I-10W (460)	I-10 West Rapid	Rapid	Central City; 17th Ave & State Capitol (last drop-off); Jefferson St & 18th Ave (first pickup)	Maryvale Village; Desert Sky Transit Center	25,279 ▼ -6.3%	Short trips start and end at I-10/79th Ave P&R
I-17 (480)	I-17 Rapid	Rapid	Central City; 17th Ave & State Capitol (last drop-off); Jefferson St & 18th Ave (first pickup)	Deer Valley; Deer Valley P&R (I-17 & Happy Valley Rd)	72,107 ▼ -7.8%	Short trips go to Metrocenter TC and I-17/Bell Rd P&R
SME (452)	South Mountain East Rapid	Rapid	Central City; 17th Ave & State Capitol (last drop-off); Jefferson St & 18th Ave (first pickup)	South Mountain Heights; 24th Street/Baseline P&R	3,203 ▲80.5%	
SMW (451)	South Mountain West Rapid	Rapid	Central City; 17th Ave & State Capitol (last drop-off); Jefferson St & 18th Ave (first pickup)	South Mountain Heights; 27th Avenue/Baseline P&R	1,653 ▼ -59.3%	

Note that the listed facility assignments for Transdev-Phoenix operated routes are normal assignments; however, routes normally operated from the South facility may occasionally be substituted with buses from the North facility and vice versa.

== Transit centers ==
Valley Metro Bus serves the following transit centers:

- 19th Ave and Montebello Transit Center, Phoenix
- Arrowhead Transit Center, Glendale
- Central Station, Phoenix
- Chandler Fashion Center Transit Center, Chandler
- Desert Sky Transit Center, Phoenix
- Ed Pastor Transit Center, Phoenix
- Gilbert Rd/Main St Transit Center, Mesa
- Main St and Sycamore Transit Center, Mesa
- Mustang Transit Center, Scottsdale
- Paradise Valley Mall Transit Center, Phoenix
- Sunnyslope Transit Center, Phoenix
- Superstition Springs Transit Center
- Tempe Transportation Center, Tempe
- Thelda Williams Transit Center, Phoenix

== Customer service ==
The Transit Book (known until December 2008 as the Bus Book, and mentioned above) is a schedule and map book that is updated twice yearly.

An automated next scheduled arrival service, NextRide, provides future arrival times for routes that serve a bus stop or light rail station. It includes a text messaging service as well as an online tracker.

== Fleet ==
Valley Metro and member cities maintain a growing fleet of over 800 vehicles for public bus routes and nearly 200 for paratransit.

Type	Delivered	Notes
ENC E-Z Rider II BRT 32’ CNG	2017-2019	Used on Tempe ORBIT circular routes
Gillig Trolley Replica HEV 29’	2013	Used on Scottsdale Trolley
Gillig Low Floor (CNG 29’, 35’ & 40’, Diesel 40’, HEV 29’ & 35’, Plus EV 40’)	2013-2025	Some 29' buses were used on circular routes; 35' buses were used on the Scottsdale Trolley; Fixed-route services use 40' buses
MCI D45 CRT LE	2020-2021	Used on express routes
New Flyer C40LFR	2011-2014	In process of retirement since 2023; Some buses were assigned to express routes
New Flyer XD40	2020-2021	
New Flyer XDE40	2024-2026	
New Flyer XN40	2017-2021	
New Flyer D40LFA	2010	
New Flyer DE60LFR	2011	
New Flyer XD60	2016–2020	
New Flyer XN60	2016–2020	Used on RAPID routes
