= Baseline/Central Avenue station =

Light rail station in Phoenix, Arizona

Baseline/Central Ave

General information
- Other names: Cesar Chavez Boulevard/Central Avenue; South Mountain Park/Preserve
- Location: 7436 South Central Avenue, Phoenix, Arizona; United States
- Coordinates: 33.378757°N 112.073281°W
- Owner: Valley Metro
- Operator: Valley Metro Rail & Streetcar
- Platforms: 1 island platform
- Tracks: 4
- Connections: Valley Metro Bus: 0, 8, 77

Construction
- Structure type: At-grade
- Accessible: Yes

History
- Opened: June 7, 2025

Services
Preceding station	Valley Metro	Following station
Southern/Central Avenue toward Metro Parkway	B Line	Terminus
Location

Baseline/Central Avenue station, also known as Cesar Chavez Boulevard/Central Avenue and South Mountain Park/Preserve, is a light rail station on the B Line of the Valley Metro Rail & Streetcar system in Phoenix. It is the southern terminus of the B Line located on Central Avenue at Baseline Road and opened on June 7, 2025.

== Notable places nearby ==
- Fountain of Life House of Worship
- Maxine O Bush Elementary School
- South Mountain Baptist Church
- South Mountain Park and Preserve
- South Mountain Plaza
