= Metro Parkway station =

Light rail station in Phoenix, Arizona

Metro Parkway

General information
- Other names: Thelda Williams Transit Center
- Location: 9827 N Metro Parkway East, Phoenix, Arizona; United States
- Coordinates: 33.575111°N 112.118417°W
- Owner: Valley Metro
- Operator: Valley Metro Rail & Streetcar
- Platforms: 1 island platform
- Tracks: 2
- Connections: Valley Metro Bus: 27, 35, 90, 106, I-17 Rapid.

Construction
- Structure type: Elevated
- Cycle facilities: Yes
- Accessible: Yes

History
- Opened: January 27, 2024

Services
Preceding station	Valley Metro	Following station
Terminus	B Line	Mountain View/25th Avenue toward Baseline/Central Avenue
Location

Metro Parkway station, also known as the Thelda Williams Transit Center, is an elevated light rail station on the B Line of the Valley Metro Rail & Streetcar system in Phoenix. It is the northern terminus of the B Line and consists of one elevated island platform. The station is located on the east side of the former Metrocenter mall and includes a park and ride facility and relocated bus transit hub, which was renamed to the Thelda Williams Transit Center after the late interim mayor. It is the first elevated station in the system. It opened on January 27, 2024, as part of the Northwest Extension Phase II.

As of 2024, the Thelda Williams Transit Center is served by Valley Metro Bus Routes 27, 35, 90, 106, and the I-17 Rapid.

== Transit-oriented development ==
In 2010, the mall was put up for sale. In January 2012, the sale to the Carlyle Development Group for $12.2 million was finalized. The company had publicly stated that over a period of five to six years, it hoped to turn the property into a mixed-use development site, with retail, residential, medical and possibly college campus tenants.

In June 2016, a massive redevelopment of Metrocenter was approved by the Phoenix City Council. Metrocenter will undergo a massive revitalization that will bring more retail and restaurants as well as office buildings, apartments, senior housing, and health-care facilities to the mall. The City of Phoenix rezoned the mall to allow office, medical and residential space; it had been zoned for solely retail use.

In a letter from general manager Kim Ramirez on June 19, 2020, Metrocenter Mall announced that they would be closing at the end of that month, citing "the drop in our occupancy levels due to the COVID-19 pandemic. After 47 years of service, Metrocenter Mall was closed on June 30, 2020, due to low store occupancy levels following the pandemic, and failed rejuvenation projects to boost foot traffic. Remains of the mall were auctioned off on December 3, 2020. The mall started to be demolished on November 18, 2024 as part of an $850 million redevelopment project that will replace the mall with other retail space, office space, apartments, townhomes, restaurants and public spaces on the 64-acre (25 ha) site.

A farewell celebration for Metrocenter—featuring a screening of Bill & Ted's Excellent Adventure—was held on May 21, 2023, prior to demolition.

On September 24, 2025, it was announced that demolition will be completed on the former mall and construction on the redevelopment project, The Metropolitan, would start in April 2026 on three of the five planned residential communities. The last two planned residential communities will begin construction in April 2027. The future apartment complex, Levante, is expected to have 350 apartment units. There will also be about 800–1,000 townhomes in The Metropolitan. The Loop at The Metropolitan will be a retail and entertainment district with retail, rooftop restaurants, an event center, an amphitheater, a park plaza and a weekly farmers market. The Track at the Loop will have a landscaped pedestrian walkway and multi-directional bike pathway which encircles The Metropolitan. The project is being led by Concord Wilshire Capital, Oakwood Homes and Diversified Partners.

== Future ==
The Thelda Williams Transit Center will be the northern terminus of the Phoenix BRT 35th Avenue and Van Buren Street bus rapid transit line. The BRT line will run from the Thelda Williams Transit Center to Greg Stanton Central Station.

== Notable places nearby ==
- Castles N' Coasters
- Cortez High School
- Cortez Park
- Goodwill Corporate Center
