= Valley Metro =

Regional transit system in Phoenix, AZ

Overview
- Locale: Phoenix metropolitan area Serves 24+ communities: Ajo; Avondale; Buckeye; Chandler; El Mirage; Fountain Hills; Gila Bend; Gilbert; Glendale; Goodyear; Guadalupe; Litchfield Park; Mesa; Peoria; Phoenix; Queen Creek; Scottsdale; Sun City; Surprise; Tempe; Tolleson; Wickenburg; Youngtown
- Transit type: Bus; Paratransit; Microtransit; Vanpool; Light rail Streetcar
- Number of lines: Light rail: 2 Streetcar: 1 Express/RAPID bus: 19; Bus: 102
- Number of stations: 41 (light rail); 14 (streetcar)
- Daily ridership: 126,100 (weekdays, Q2 2026)
- Annual ridership: 41,422,400 (2025)
- Headquarters: 101 North 1st Avenue; Phoenix, Arizona
- Website: valleymetro.org

Operation
- Began operation: 1993

The Valley Metro Regional Public Transportation Authority, branded as Valley Metro, is the unified public brand of the regional transit agency for the Phoenix Metropolitan Area. Valley Metro serves 18 member municipalities across the region, including Avondale, Buckeye, Chandler, El Mirage, Fountain Hills, Gilbert, Glendale, Goodyear, Mesa, Peoria, Phoenix, Queen Creek, Scottsdale, Surprise, Tempe, Tolleson, Wickenburg, and Youngtown.

Within the system, it is divided between Valley Metro Bus, which runs all bus operations, and Valley Metro Rail & Streetcar, which is responsible for light rail and streetcar operations in the Valley. In 2025, the combined bus and rail system had a ridership of 41,422,400, or about 126,100 per weekday as of the second quarter of 2026.

Valley Metro is a membership organization. Most services are separately funded and operated by individual cities and suburbs in the greater Phoenix region. These cities have agreed to participate in Valley Metro as a unifying brand name to streamline service and reduce confusion among riders. Each city appoints a representative to the RPTA board of directors, and a chairman, vice chairman, and treasurer are voted on amongst the board members for a one-year term.

The two largest operators of bus service are the city of Phoenix and the Regional Public Transportation Authority (operating multi-city routes and services primarily in Mesa, Chandler, Gilbert, and Tempe). Circulator service in Glendale is operated by the city of Glendale directly, the Scottsdale Trolley circulators are contracted by the city of Scottsdale, and intra-city paratransit service in the cities of Glendale and Peoria are operated by the respective cities directly.

The RPTA operates a customer service, marketing and long-range transit planning operation from headquarters in downtown Phoenix which is shared among all Valley Metro member cities. A few routes which operate within several member cities have their funding and operations shared between those cities. Some RPTA funding is used to augment service provided by the member cities (this is expected to increase over the next several years due to a 2004 voter approval of an extension to the original 1985 sales tax for transit funding). The city of Phoenix alone operates 73 percent of all Valley Metro routes (several of which also serve suburban cities).

== History ==
The Regional Public Transportation Authority (RPTA) was formed in 1985 after Phoenix-area voters approved a one-half percent sales tax increase for expansion of the local freeway and mass transit systems. The RPTA was then chartered under the laws of the state of Arizona. At the time, almost all transit service in the Phoenix area was operated by Phoenix Transit System (PTS), with a few other bus services such as the Mesa Sunrunner and Scottsdale Connection having started around 1990. Valley Metro, as an integrated regional transit service, did not begin operations under its own brand identity until 1993. At the same time, PTS and Mesa Sunrunner were merged into Valley Metro, and several new routes operating under the name were started.

Prior to the formation of the RPTA, the bus route structure of Phoenix Transit System was different, both in terms of numbering and routes. The network was based on a hub-and-spoke system with most routes laying over in downtown Phoenix.

In the mid-1980s, the route structure was changed to form the basis for the system operating today. Most routes were restructured so that they would operate on a point to point structure, instead of being routed through the downtown area. Routes that operated on multiple streets were also split. The numbering system was simplified so that bus routes were numbered according to the block number of the corridor that they operated along. Because of the establishment of route numbers in the 1980s and 1990s, the express routes were renumbered to the "500-series".

In 2001, Valley Metro expanded to Sunday service in Phoenix, Glendale, and Scottsdale, with Tempe having Sunday service since 1999.

=== ValTrans proposal ===
In 1989, a referendum took place in the RPTA constituent cities on expanded bus services (the fleet size would nearly have been tripled) and the implementation of elevated rail as part of a plan called "ValTrans".

The initial proposed elevated rail network was to consist of three color coded lines. For instance, the Red Line was to connect east Mesa to the Metrocenter Mall in northwest Phoenix via downtown, with planned stops at Arizona State University and Sky Harbor International Airport. The countywide measure was defeated by a two-to-one margin, with Tempe being the only municipality where it passed. However, the subsequent bus route created in place of the line became the second most heavily used in the system.

Voters rejected a subsequent regional initiative in 1994 and municipal referendums in 1997, largely due to concerns over cost and lack of progress on freeway proposals. City of Tempe voters approved a half-percent dedicated transit sales tax in September 1996, providing the initial funding to expand local bus service and study the light rail system that was eventually built.

=== Transit 2000 light rail proposal ===
In 2000, the Transit 2000 Regional Transportation Plan (RTP), which involved a 0.4 percent sales tax, was approved by voters in Phoenix. It sought to improve the local bus service and create bus rapid transit and light rail, among other things. Valley Metro Rail & Streetcar has a goal of a one-third farebox ratio, and the RTP anticipated this to rise to 45% by 2025. The plan implemented studies for further rail services, though for some time in the future. It also used the route placing and color designations from the 1989 plan.

=== Proposition 104 ===
In August 2015, Phoenix voters passed Proposition 104, increasing the sales tax allocated to transit from 0.4 to 0.7%. It is expected to partially pay for a $31 billion transit plan over 35 years. Under the plan, about half of the new revenue will go to bus service, a third to light rail, 7% to street improvements, and 10% to debt service. 42 miles (68 km) of light rail are planned to be built.

== Services ==
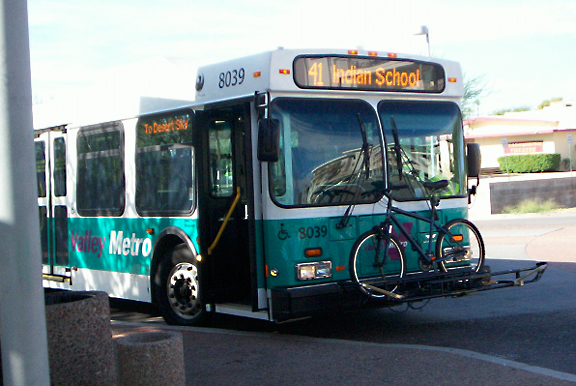
A bus waiting in Scottsdale, wearing the Valley Metro color scheme used from 2006 to 2008

=== Fixed-route bus ===
Valley Metro operates bus routes around the Phoenix area through private companies in Phoenix, Mesa, Tempe, Glendale, and other parts of Maricopa County. These include routes on city streets, suburban Express buses, RAPID buses, and circulators in parts of Phoenix, Glendale, Tempe, Mesa, Avondale, and Scottsdale.

=== Light rail and streetcar ===
Interactive map of Valley Metro Rail & Streetcar services

Valley Metro Rail & Streetcar operates two light rail lines, the A Line and B Line, totaling 38.5 miles (62.0 km) of track between the cities of Phoenix, Tempe, and Mesa. The system was most recently expanded with the opening of its South Central line in June 2025, with two additional extensions in the design or pre-construction phases, with expected opening dates ranging from 2028 to 2030. Future extensions include service to the Arizona State Capitol and Desert Sky Mall.

The S Line is a streetcar extension of the system. It serves 14 stops across three miles of track serving various parts of the city's downtown, as well as the Tempe campus of Arizona State University, with the A Line.

=== Paratransit ===
Valley Metro provides paratransit service for eligible residents through a combination of operators:

- Valley Metro Paratransit (contracted by the RPTA and operated by MTM Transit)
- Phoenix Dial-A-Ride (contracted by the City of Phoenix and operated by MV Transportation)
- Glendale Dial-A-Ride (operated by the City of Glendale)
- Peoria Dial-A-Ride (operated by the City of Peoria)

Valley Metro Paratransit operates all trips outside the cities of Phoenix, Paradise Valley, Glendale, and Peoria, as well as regional trips. Phoenix Dial-A-Ride operates trips within the Phoenix city limits and the town of Paradise Valley. Glendale Dial-A-Ride and Peoria Dial-A-Ride operate trips within the boundaries of their respective cities. Service area boundaries vary by city, with some cities only offering service within .75 miles (1.21 km) of a fixed bus route while other cities offer service in a larger area. To handle overflow demand, some trips on Valley Metro Paratransit and Phoenix Dial-A-Ride are outsourced to local taxi companies or to non-emergency medical transportation providers.

=== Rideshare ===
Other commuting options are coordinated by Valley Metro's Rideshare department, funded by contracts with Maricopa County and the Maricopa Association of Governments. Any employer with 50 or more full-time employees is required to participate in the program, which aims to promote transit use. Employees of Arizona state government agencies who work in the region have their own rideshare department, called Capitol Rideshare.

== Fares ==
Valley Metro fares can be paid using the Copper Card, which replaced paper passes in 2024.

== See also ==
- Transportation in Phoenix, Arizona
- Roads and freeways in metropolitan Phoenix
