= List of Valley Metro Rail & Streetcar stations =

Valley Metro Rail & Streetcar is a light rail and streetcar transit system that serves the Phoenix metropolitan area in Arizona, United States. The system, which operates under the Valley Metro brand name, has 54 stations along two light rail lines, covering 38.5 miles (62.0 km) of tracks within the cities of Phoenix, Tempe, and Mesa, and 14 stations along one streetcar line, covering 3 miles (4.8 km) of tracks within the city of Tempe. The system serves on average over 49,400 weekday riders as of 2016, making it one of the busiest light rail systems in the United States.

Valley Metro Rail opened its initial 20-mile (32 km) starter line on December 27, 2008. The starter line, which was funded through a combination of federal, regional and local municipal funds, operated from the Montebello/19th Avenue station in Phoenix, through Tempe, serving the Arizona State University Tempe campus, and ended at the Sycamore/Main Street station in Mesa. The starter line provided service to 28 stations in total, which were primarily located on-street at the intersections of major arterial roads every 0.5 miles (0.80 km), although mid-block stations are common in areas of higher urban density. On April 8, 2013, the PHX Sky Train people mover opened, providing direct service from the 44th Street/Washington station to Phoenix Sky Harbor International Airport. On August 22, 2015, Valley Metro's first light rail extension, the Central Mesa Extension, opened, which added four new stations on the eastern end of the starter line going through downtown Mesa, including a new terminus at Mesa Drive/Main Street station. The second light rail extension, the Northwest Extension Phase I opened on March 19, 2016, which added three new stations on the western end of the starter line on 19th Avenue, including a new terminus at 19th Avenue/Dunlap station. The S Line streetcar in Tempe would open on May 20, 2022.

Three new stations opened on 2019. Two of these, Stapley/Main Street station and Gilbert Road/Main Street station, are part of the Gilbert Road Extension, which began service on May 18, 2019. The third station, 50th Street/Washington station, is an infill station located between the 44th Street/Washington station and Priest Drive/Washington station in Phoenix. This station opened in April 2019, and was funded by Proposition 104, Phoenix's 2015 ballot initiative that extended and expanded the city's transportation sales tax.

Three new stations opened on 2024. The Metro Parkway station, Mountain View/25th Avenue station, 25th Avenue/Dunlap station are part of the Northwest Extension Phase II, which began service on January 27, 2024. The Metro Parkway station is also the first elevated station in the system.

Each light rail station is approximately 300 feet (91 m) long, which allows up to three separate light rail vehicles to be linked into one train (each light rail vehicle is 90 feet (27 m) long). Access is primarily provided at the end of the stations, usually at signalized intersections. All stations maintain a similar design, are ADA accessible and provide level boarding throughout. Each station consists of a platform and an overhead canopy that provides shade and shelter from the weather. Station amenities include seating, trash canisters, a drinking fountain, lighting, digital and vocal rider information, emergency call boxes and public art. Fares can be purchased at the ticket vending machines located at each end of the station platforms. Five of the stations have associated transit centers for transferring between light rail and buses. 10 of the stations have associated park-and-ride facilities that provide approximately 4,500 public parking spaces combined along the entire light rail system.

Valley Metro is currently in various phases of planning and development on two light rail extensions. Combined, these extensions will expand the light rail system by 50 miles (80 km) by the year 2030. Two of these extensions have completed a sufficient amount of planning to determine the number of stations they will include. The South Central Extension will add eight stations. The other two extensions are still going through the station selection process. The Capitol Extension will add approximately two new light rail stations. The I-10 West Extension will add 8 new stations. The West Phoenix Extension is in the planning process, and thus the number of stations have yet to be determined. The Northeast Extension has not begun the planning process, and thus the number of stations have yet to be determined. Valley Metro also completed the S Line in downtown Tempe, which has 14 stops along its 3-mile (4.8 km) alignment. Two of these stops directly interface with the existing light rail stations at Mill Avenue/3rd Street station and Dorsey/Apache Boulevard station. After the completion of all of these extensions and the 50th St/Washington infill station, the Phoenix metropolitan area will have 63 miles (101 km) of light rail and over 65 separate light rail stations. As part of Phoenix's Proposition 104, various new extensions have been proposed, although none of these have been formally adopted by Valley Metro's board of directors.

== System ==
The system has 66 stations serving its three lines. Three stations are transfer stations, which allow passengers to transfer between lines. Six stations are termini—stations at the end of lines. 38 stations are within the city of Phoenix, 21 stations are within the city of Tempe, and seven stations are within the city of Mesa.

=== Lines ===
There are three Valley Metro Rail & Streetcar lines, each of which is associated with a letter.

Name	Stations	Termini	Opening	Newest extension	Type
A Line	26	Downtown Phoenix Hub (west); Gilbert Road/Main Street (east)	2008	2025	Light rail
B Line	29	Metro Parkway (north); Baseline/Central Avenue (south)	2008	2025	Light rail
S Line	14	Marina Heights/Rio Salado Parkway (north); Dorsey/Apache Boulevard (south)	2022	–	Streetcar

== Stations ==
The northern terminus station of the B Line at Metro Parkway station. This is the system's first elevated station.

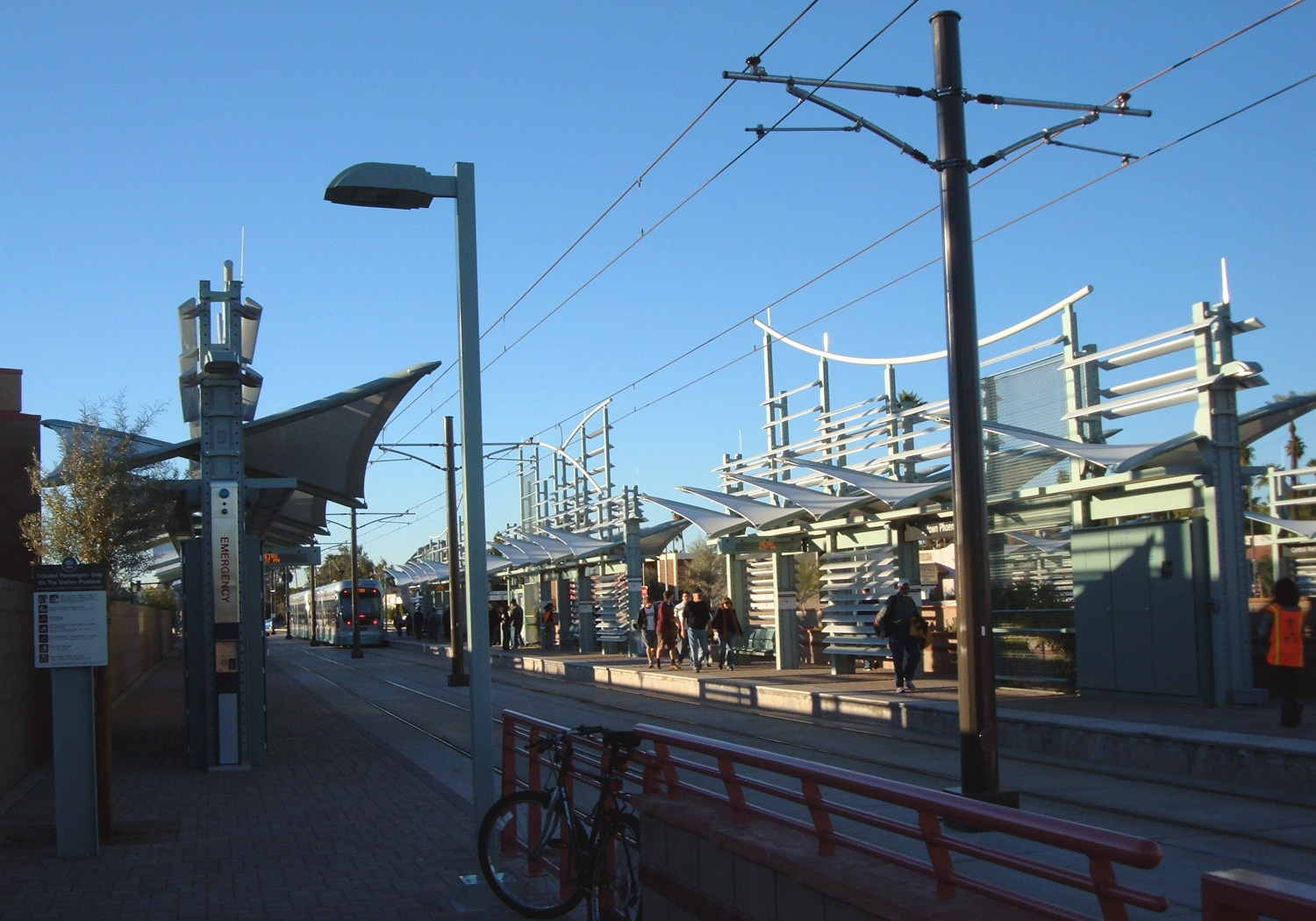
The Central Avenue/Camelback station is an off-street side platform station that diagonally cuts part of a city block between Camelback Road and Central Avenue.

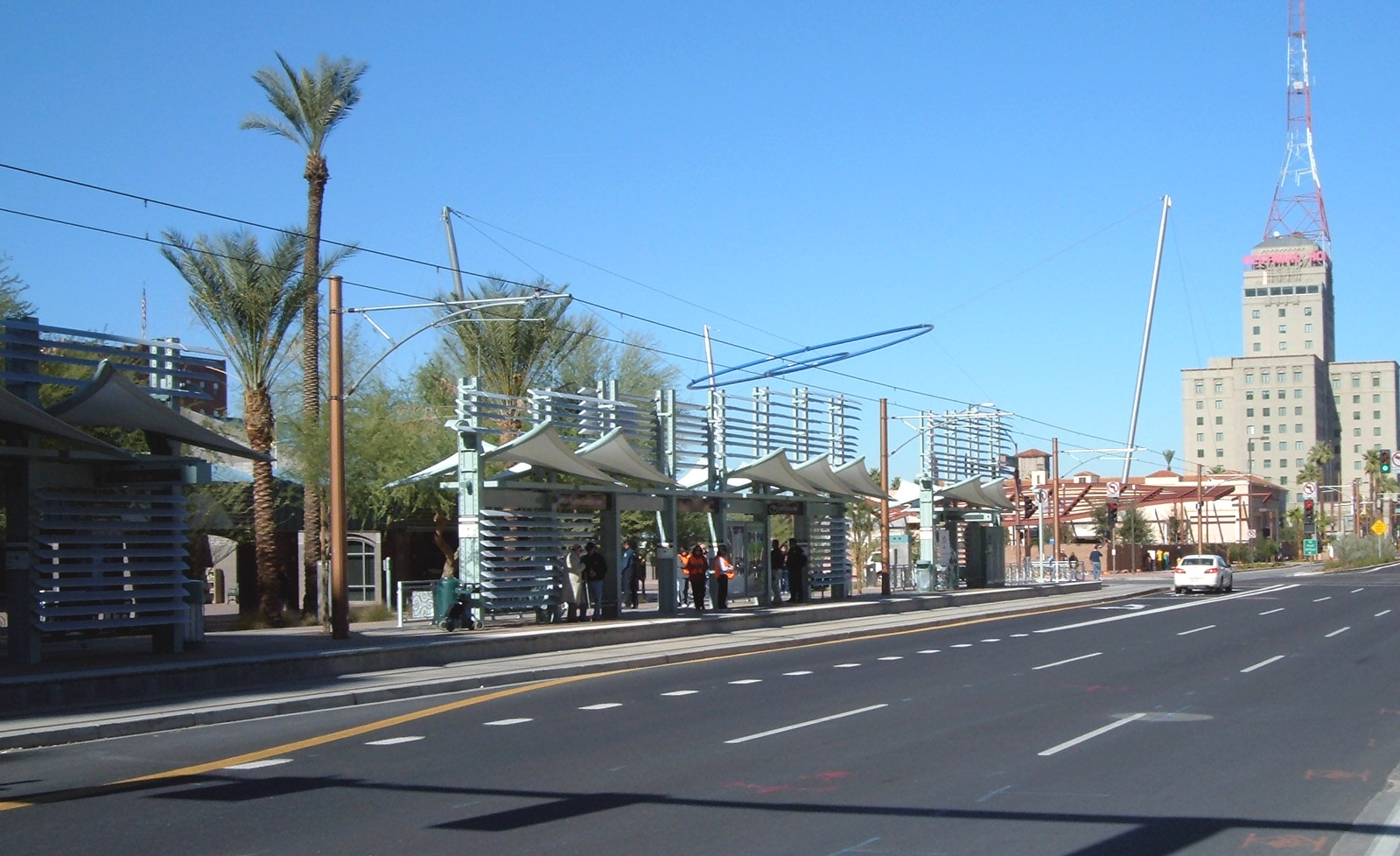
The Downtown Phoenix Hub is a side platform split-station, with one platform located on Central Avenue, one platform on 1st Avenue, one platform on Jefferson Street, and one platform on Washington Street.

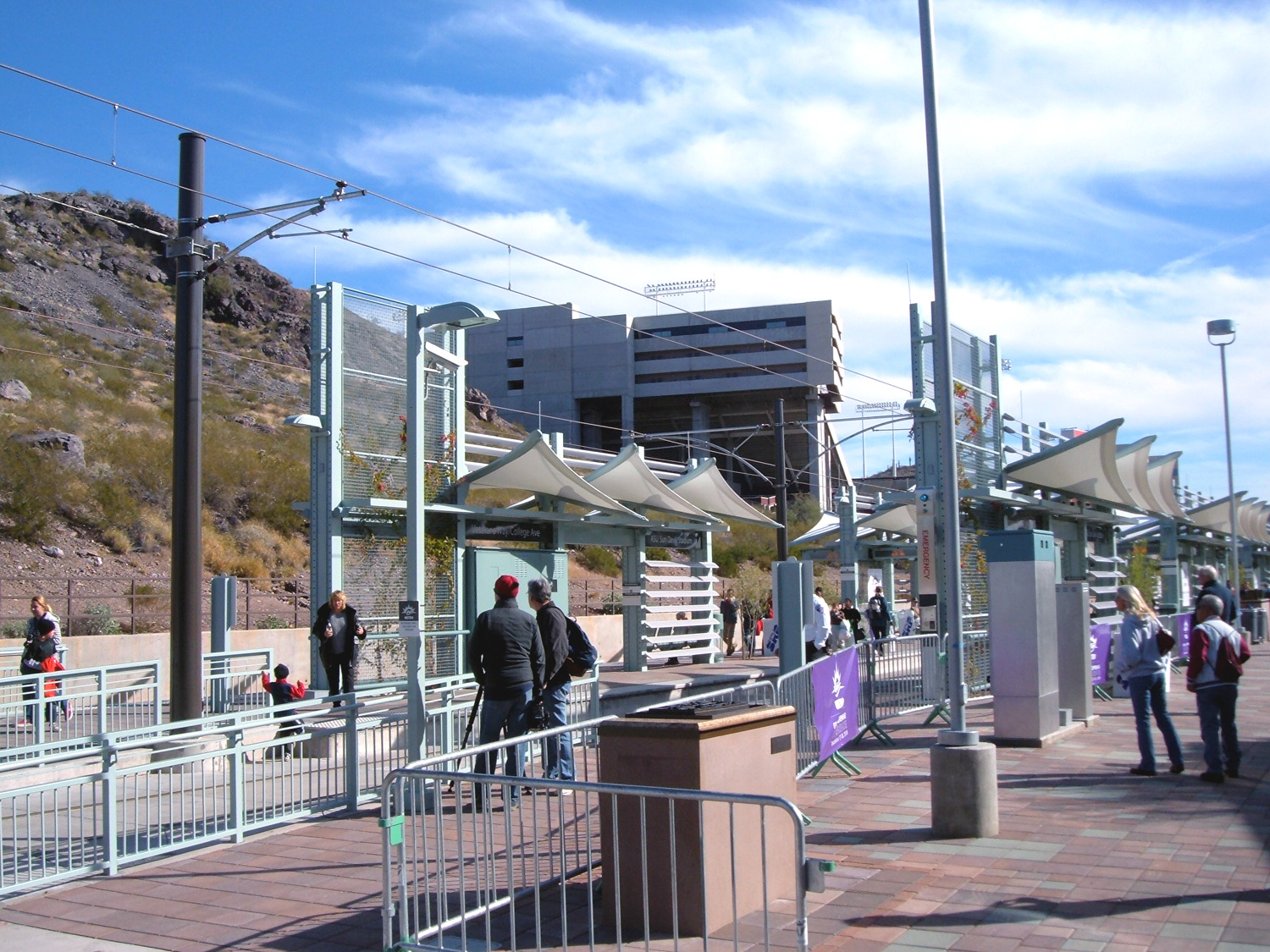
The Veterans Way/College Avenue station is located in Downtown Tempe near Arizona State University and hosts a large bus transit center.

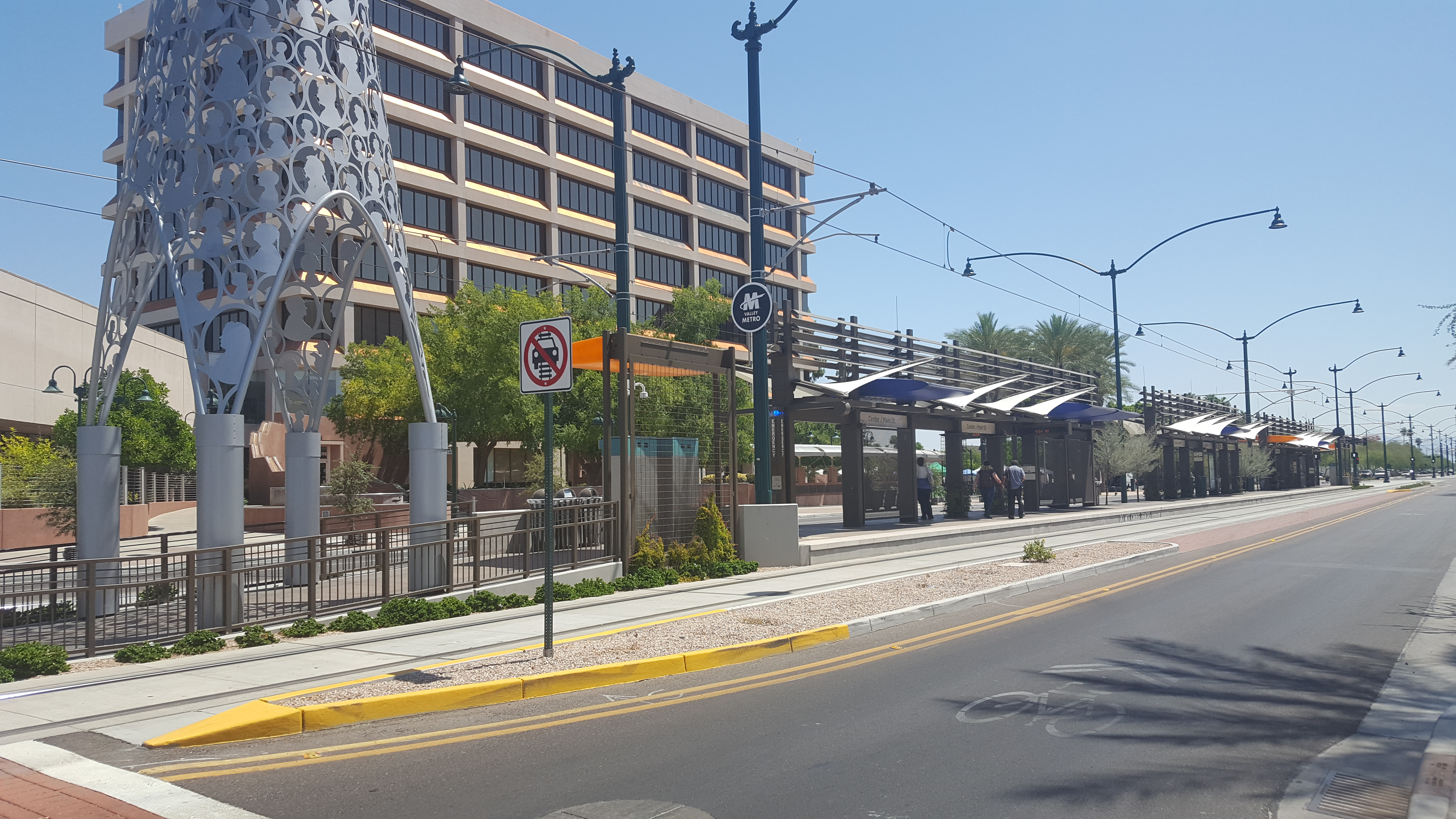
The Center/Main Street is located in downtown Mesa, adjacent to the City Hall complex and the Mesa Arts Center.

†	Terminal station
*	Transfer station
Park and ride	Park and ride station
Transport hub	Transport hub
Bicycle parking rack	Bike rack station
→	Transfer to PHX Sky Train

Station	Line(s)	City	Character area/travel sheds/urban village	Opened	Platform type	Ridership (FY 2021) (Note: Ridership is reported as average weekday boardings.)	Coordinates	Ref(s)
3rd Street/Ash Avenue (Note: This station is a split platform that serves one-way traffic.)	S Line	Tempe	Rio Salado	May 20, 2022	Side	–	33°25′38.45″N 111°56′34.95″W	
3rd Street/Jefferson	A Line	Phoenix	Central City	Dec 27, 2008	Side	396	33°26′46.50″N 112°4′9.46″W	
3rd Street/Washington	A Line	Phoenix	Central City	Dec 27, 2008	Side	278	33°26′54.03″N 112°4′14.05″W	
5th Street/Ash Avenue	S Line	Tempe	Rio Salado	May 20, 2022	Side	–	33°25′30.42″N 111°56′36.37″W	
6th Street/Mill Avenue	S Line	Tempe	Rio Salado	May 20, 2022	Side	–	33°25′29.64″N 111°56′23.95″W	
7th Avenue/Camelback	B Line	Phoenix	Alhambra	Dec 27, 2008	Island	399	33°30′32.75″N 112°5′0.10″W	
9th Street/Mill Avenue	S Line	Tempe	Rio Salado	May 20, 2022	Island	–	33°25′15.30″N 111°56′23.85″W	
11th Street/Mill Avenue	S Line	Tempe	Rio Salado	May 20, 2022	Island	–	33°25′5.08″N 111°56′23.71″W	
12th Street/Jefferson	A Line	Phoenix	Central City	Dec 27, 2008	Side	157	33°26′49.90″N 112°3′20.65″W	
12th Street/Washington	A Line	Phoenix	Central City	Dec 27, 2008	Side	136	33°26′53.62″N 112°3′25.82″W	
19th Avenue/Camelback	B Line	Phoenix	Alhambra	Dec 27, 2008	Island	693	33°30′33.54″N 112°5′56.18″W	
19th Avenue/Dunlap	B Line	Phoenix	North Mountain	Mar 19, 2016	Island	1,465	33°34′2.23″N 112°6′3.23″W	
24th Street/Jefferson	A Line	Phoenix	Central City	Dec 27, 2008	Side	218	33°26′49.98″N 112°1′45.32″W	
24th Street/Washington	A Line	Phoenix	Central City	Dec 27, 2008	Side	237	33°26′53.43″N 112°1′45.42″W	
25th Avenue/Dunlap	B Line	Phoenix	North Mountain	Jan 27, 2024	Island	–	33°34′3.29″N 112°6′40.94″W	
38th Street/Washington	A Line	Phoenix	Central City	Dec 27, 2008	Island	327	33°26′52.38″N 111°59′59.83″W	
44th Street/Washington →	A Line	Phoenix	Camelback East	Dec 27, 2008	Island	903	33°26′52.69″N 111°59′17.37″W	
50th Street/Washington	A Line	Phoenix	Camelback East	Apr 25, 2019	Island	217	33.446857°N 111.974813°W	
Alma School/Main Street	A Line	Mesa	Downtown	Aug 22, 2015	Island	581	33°24′53.09″N 111°51′20.42″W	
Baseline/Central Avenue †	B Line	Phoenix	South Mountain	Jun 7, 2025	Island	–	33°22′43.52″N 112°4′23.81″W	
Broadway/Central Avenue	B Line	Phoenix	South Mountain	Jun 7, 2025	Island	–	33°24′23.97″N 112°4′24.02″W	
Buckeye/Central Avenue	B Line	Phoenix	Central City	Jun 7, 2025	Island	–	33°25′5.54″N 112°4′24.68″W	
Campbell/Central Avenue	B Line	Phoenix	Encanto	Dec 27, 2008	Island	257	33°30′4.14″N 112°4′25.93″W	
Center Parkway/Washington	A Line	Tempe	North Tempe	Dec 27, 2008	Island	138	33°26′16.34″N 111°56′48.07″W	
Center/Main Street	A Line	Mesa	Downtown	Aug 22, 2015	Island	217	33°24′53.62″N 111°49′51.06″W	
Central Avenue/Camelback	B Line	Phoenix	Alhambra	Dec 27, 2008	Side	313	33°30′30.70″N 112°4′31.37″W	
College Avenue/Apache Boulevard	S Line	Tempe	Apache	May 20, 2022	Island	–	33°24′52.88″N 111°56′6.98″W	
Country Club/Main Street	A Line	Mesa	Downtown	Aug 22, 2015	Island	558	33°24′53.66″N 111°50′20.17″W	
Dorsey/Apache Boulevard †*	A Line; S Line	Tempe	Apache	Dec 27, 2008 (A Line); May 20, 2022 (S Line)	Island (A Line); Side (S Line)	346	33°24′53.66″N 111°55′1.13″W	
Downtown Phoenix Hub †*	A Line; B Line	Phoenix	Central City	Jun 7, 2025	Side	–	33°26′53.75″N 112°4′28.5″W	
Encanto/Central Avenue	B Line	Phoenix	Encanto	Dec 27, 2008	Island	200	33°28′24.28″N 112°4′25.98″W	
Gilbert Road/Main Street †	A Line	Mesa	Downtown	May 18, 2019	Island	1,261	33°24′55.30″N 111°47′26.20″W	
Glendale/19th Avenue	B Line	Phoenix	Alhambra	Mar 19, 2016	Island	592	33°32′14.52″N 112°5′59.03″W	
Hayden Ferry/Rio Salado Parkway	S Line	Tempe	Rio Salado	May 20, 2022	Island	–	33°25′48.50″N 111°56′17.55″W	
Indian School/Central Avenue	B Line	Phoenix	Encanto	Dec 27, 2008	Island	543	33°29′43.93″N 112°4′25.89″W	
Lincoln/1st Avenue	B Line	Phoenix	Central City	Jun 7, 2025	Side	–	33°26′29.98″N 112°4′29.96″W	
Lincoln/Central Avenue	B Line	Phoenix	Central City	Jun 7, 2025	Side	–	33°26′30.21″N 112°4′25.91″W	
Marina Heights/Rio Salado Parkway †	S Line	Tempe	Rio Salado	May 20, 2022	Island	–	33°25′45.71″N 111°55′57.49″W	
McClintock/Apache Boulevard	A Line	Tempe	Apache	Dec 27, 2008	Island	541	33°24′52.33″N 111°54′30.02″W	
McDowell/Central Avenue	B Line	Phoenix	Central City	Dec 27, 2008	Island	568	33°27′52.59″N 112°4′25.86″W	
Mesa Drive/Main Street	A Line	Mesa	Downtown	Aug 22, 2015	Island	354	33°24′53.58″N 111°49′20.47″W	
Metro Parkway †	B Line	Phoenix	North Mountain	Jan 27, 2024	Island	–	33°34′30.40″N 112°7′6.30″W	
Mill Avenue/3rd Street*	A Line; S Line	Tempe	Rio Salado	Dec 27, 2008; May 20, 2022	Side	494	33°25′38.30″N 111°56′26.54″W	
Montebello/19th Avenue	B Line	Phoenix	Alhambra	Dec 27, 2008	Island	740	33°31′13.35″N 112°5′59.35″W	
Mountain View/25th Avenue	B Line	Phoenix	North Mountain	Jan 27, 2024	Island	–	33°34′23.47″N 112°6′43.76″W	
Northern/19th Avenue	B Line	Phoenix	Alhambra	Mar 19, 2016	Island	469	33°33′7.8″N 112°5′58.79″W	
Osborn/Central Avenue	B Line	Phoenix	Encanto	Dec 27, 2008	Island	359	33°29′11.99″N 112°4′25.95″W	
Paseo del Saber/Apache Boulevard	S Line	Tempe	Apache	May 20, 2022	Island	–	33°24′53.07″N 111°55′45.70″W	
Pioneer/Central Avenue	B Line	Phoenix	South Mountain	Jun 7, 2025	Island	–	33°25′5.54″N 112°4′24.68″W	
Price–101 Freeway/Apache Boulevard	A Line	Tempe	Apache	Dec 27, 2008	Island	326	33°24′52.60″N 111°53′17.36″W	
Priest Drive/Washington	A Line	Tempe	North Tempe	Dec 27, 2008	Island	443	33°26′30.57″N 111°57′22.32″W	
Roeser/Central Avenue	B Line	Phoenix	South Mountain	Jun 7, 2025	Island	–	33°23′58.24″N 112°4′24.00″W	
Roosevelt/Central Avenue	B Line	Phoenix	Central City	Dec 27, 2008	Island	436	33°27′32.44″N 112°4′26.71″W	
Rural/Apache Boulevard	S Line	Tempe	Apache	May 20, 2022	Island	–	33°24′53.17″N 111°55′30.90″W	
Smith–Martin/Apache Boulevard	A Line	Tempe	Apache	Dec 27, 2008	Island	229	33°24′52.51″N 111°54′3.00″W	
Southern/Central Avenue	B Line	Phoenix	South Mountain	Jun 7, 2025	Island	–	33°23′31.52″N 112°4′23.89″W	
Stapley/Main Street	A Line	Mesa	Downtown	May 18, 2019	Island	273	33°24′54.04″N 111°48′21.20″W	
Sycamore/Main Street	A Line	Mesa	Downtown	Dec 27, 2008	Island	581	33°24′52.76″N 111°52′15.84″W	
Tempe Beach Park/Rio Salado Parkway	S Line	Tempe	Apache	May 20, 2022	Side	–	33°25′46.21″N 111°56′29.68″W	
Thomas/Central Avenue	B Line	Phoenix	Encanto	Dec 27, 2008	Island	633	33°28′51.68″N 112°4′25.79″W	
University Drive/Ash Avenue	S Line	Tempe	Rio Salado	May 20, 2022	Side	–	33°25′20.28″N 111°56′32.90″W	
University Drive/Rural	A Line	Tempe	Rio Salado	Dec 27, 2008	Side	547	33°25′14.30″N 111°55′37.49″W	
Van Buren/1st Avenue	B Line	Phoenix	Central City	Dec 27, 2008	Side	371	33°27′6.87″N 112°4′30.12″W	
Van Buren/Central Avenue	B Line	Phoenix	Central City	Dec 27, 2008	Side	589	33°27′6.98″N 112°4′26.26″W	
Veterans Way/College Avenue	A Line	Tempe	Rio Salado	Dec 27, 2008	Side	541	33°25′33.33″N 111°56′9.91″W	
Washington/Central Avenue	B Line	Phoenix	Central City	Dec 27, 2008	Side	470	33°26′55.82″N 112°4′26.10″W	

== See also ==
- Transportation in Arizona
