= Northeast Extension =

Northeast Extension may refer to:

== Transportation ==
- Northeast Extension (VMR), a proposed extension of the Valley Metro Rail light rail system in Phoenix, Arizona
- Pennsylvania Turnpike Northeast Extension, the portion of Interstate 476 after it enters the Pennsylvania Turnpike system
