= Central Avenue station =

Central Avenue station may refer to:

- Central Avenue (BMT Myrtle Avenue Line), a subway station in New York City, in Brooklyn
- Central Avenue station (MBTA) in Boston, Massachusetts
- Campbell/Central Avenue station, in Phoenix, Arizona
- Central Avenue/Camelback station, in Phoenix, Arizona
- Roosevelt/Central Avenue station, in Phoenix, Arizona
