= University Drive/Rural station =

Light rail station in Tempe, Arizona

University Dr/Rural Rd
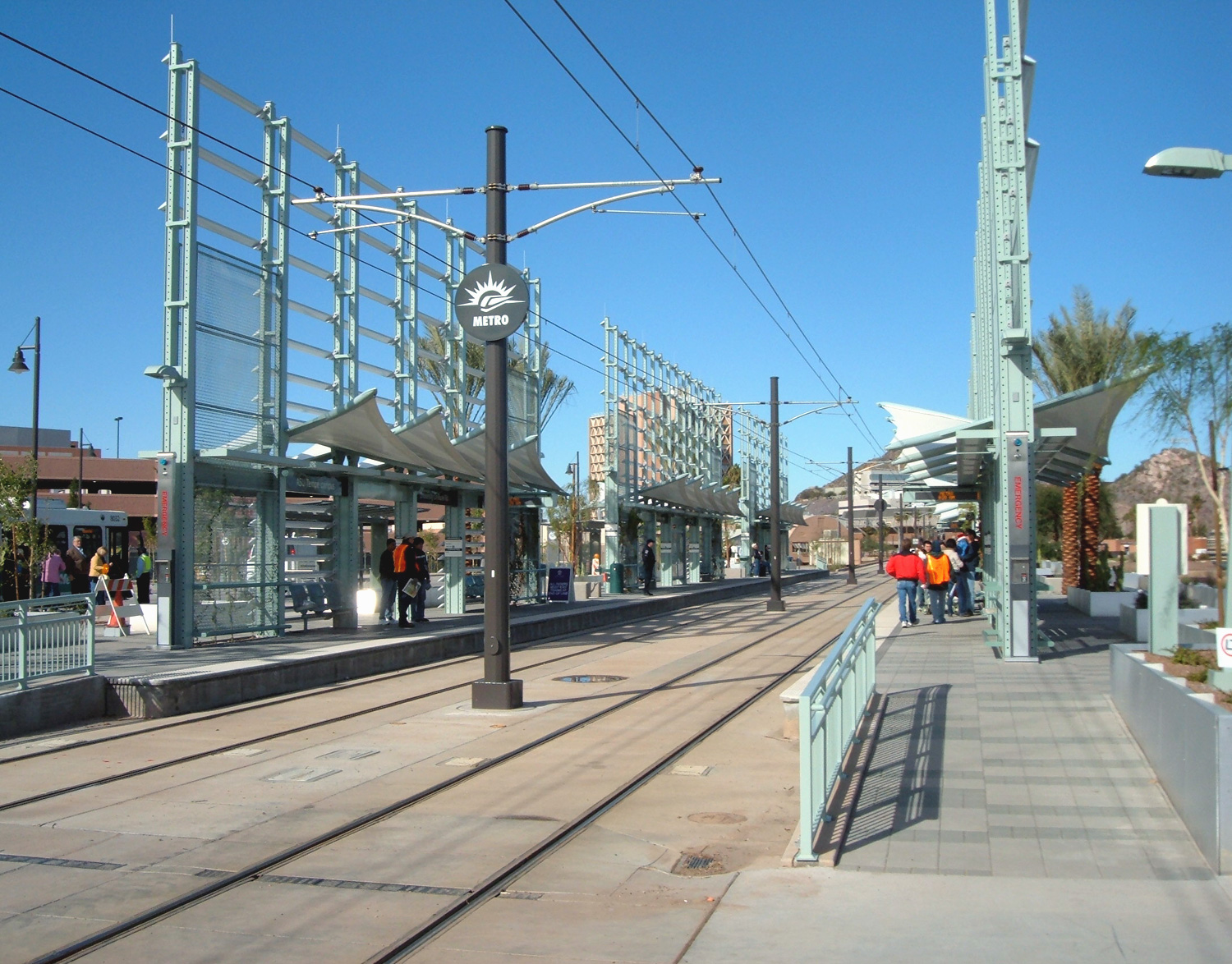
- The station on its first day of service, December 27, 2008

General information
- Other names: ASU Earth/Space/Life Center
- Location: Rural Road and Tyler Street, Tempe, Arizona; United States
- Coordinates: 33°25′14.75″N 111°55′37″W
- Owner: Valley Metro
- Operator: Valley Metro Rail & Streetcar
- Platforms: 2 side platforms
- Tracks: 2
- Connections: Valley Metro Bus: 30, 62, 72, Tempe Orbit Mars, Tempe Orbit Mercury, Tempe Flash FlixBus

Construction
- Structure type: At-grade
- Accessible: Yes

Other information
- Station code: 10023

History
- Opened: December 27, 2008

Services
Preceding station	Valley Metro	Following station
Veterans Way/College Avenue toward Downtown Phoenix Hub	A Line	Dorsey/Apache Boulevard toward Gilbert Road/Main Street
Location

University Drive/Rural station, also known as ASU Earth/Space/Life Center, is a station on the A Line of the Valley Metro Rail & Streetcar system in Tempe, Arizona, United States. The station consists of two side platforms on the northeastern edge of the campus of Arizona State University. The station is not actually at the intersection of its named streets, sitting some distance south of University Drive, with the platforms running northwest from Rural Road along the former alignment of the Phoenix and Eastern Railroad.

A transit center is located to the west of the station, with connections to three Tempe Orbit bus lines, the ASU Tempe-Polytechnic campus shuttle for ASU students, and the Tucson-Phoenix-Flagstaff FlixBus line.

The station features The Spirit of Inquiry, a monumental spherical sculpture by Seattle artists Bill Will and Norie Sato.

== Ridership ==
Weekday rail passengers
Year	In	Out	Average daily in	Average daily out
2009	532,64	522,842	2,097	2,058
2010	654,09	667,599	2,585	2,639

== Notable places nearby ==
- Arizona State University Tempe campus
- Gallery of Scientific Exploration
- Marston Exploration Theater
- Mullett Arena

== Connections ==
Valley Metro Bus	Route number	Route name	North/east end		South/west end	
Valley Metro Bus	30	University Drive	University Drive/Power Road	University Drive/Price Road (select weekday trips)	South Mountain Community College (select weekday trips)	24th Street/Baseline Park-and-Ride
Valley Metro Bus	62	Hardy Drive	Tempe Marketplace	Tempe Transportation Center (select weekday trips)	Guadalupe/Kyrene Road (select weekday trips)	IKEA Tempe
Valley Metro Bus	72	Scottsdale Road/Rural Road	Thompson Peak Medical Center	Terminus (select trips)	Ray Road/Rural Road (select trips)	Chandler Fashion Center
Valley Metro Bus	FLSH	Tempe FLASH	ASU - Lot 59		Forest Avenue/Gammage Parkway	
Valley Metro Bus	MARS	Orbit MARS	Tempe Transportation Center		Dorsey Lane/Broadway Road (select weekday trips)	Southern Avenue/Evergreen Road
Valley Metro Bus	MERC	Orbit MERCURY	Tempe Transportation Center		McClintock Drive/8th Street (select weekday trips)	Escalante Center
FlixBus	Route number	Route name	North/east end		South/west end	
FlixBus	2040	Las Vegas-Phoenix-Tucson	Las Vegas Strip		University of Arizona	
FlixBus	2042	Phoenix-Tucson	Terminus		Tucson (East) bus station	
FlixBus	2047	Tucson-Phoenix-Flagstaff	Flagstaff station		University of Arizona	
Arizona State University Campus Shuttle	Route number	Route name	North/east end		South/west end	
Arizona State University Campus Shuttle	GOLD	Polytechnic-Tempe	Forest Avenue/Lemon Street		ASU Polytechnic campus	
