= Norie Sato =

American artist

Norie Sato (born July 19, 1949) is an artist living in Seattle, Washington. She works in the field of public art using sculpture and various media–including glass, terrazzo, plastic film, stone, and metal–and often incorporating lighting effects, landscaping, mosaics, prints, and video. She frequently collaborates with architects, city planners, and other artists and specializes in integrating artwork and site specific design.

== Life ==
Sato was born in Sendai, Japan and moved to the United States with her family when she was 4. After spending some years in Michigan she graduated from the University of Michigan with a Bachelor of Fine Arts in Printmaking in 1971. She moved to Seattle in 1972 and received her Master of Fine Arts degree in Printmaking and Video from the University of Washington in 1974. Since that time she has lived and worked in Seattle and has been involved with public art.

== Work ==
Sato has managed, designed, and contributed artwork to urban infrastructure projects, parks, universities, aquatic centers, galleries, museums, transportation systems, airports, libraries, and other civic structures. She has worked extensively in light-rail public-art projects in Phoenix, Portland, Tempe, Salt Lake City, and particularly her native Seattle where she was hired by Sound Transit for its Link Light Rail project in 1998 as a system artist collaborating with fellow artists Dan Corson, Sheila Klein, and Roger Shimomura.

Selected works

- Seattle Light Rail system at Columbia City station
- The Reflection Room at San Diego Airport
- Romare Bearden Park in Charlotte, NC
- San Francisco International Airport
- Port of Portland headquarters in Oregon
- Palmer Human Development and Family Studies Building at Iowa State University
- Spirit of Inquiry sculpture at University Drive and Rural Road Metro Station - Tempe AZ
- Artwork for Chisholm Trail Parkway in Fort Worth
- Artwork for Waterfront Seattle's Union Street East-West Connector (in progress)

== Awards ==
Shortly after moving to Seattle, one of Sato's prints won a first prize at the 1973 Pacific Northwest Arts and Crafts Fair. She was awarded National Endowment for the Arts Fellowships in 1979 and 1981. She received the 1983 Betty Bowen award, the 1998 The National Terrazzo and Mosaic Association Honor Award, the 2013 Twining Humber Award from Washington State Artist Trust, the 2014 Public Art Network Leadership Award from Americans for the Arts, and the 2014 Washington State Governor's Arts and Heritage Individual Artist Award.

Sato served on the Visual Arts Advisory Panel for the NEA in 1983. She is a former member of the Americans for the Arts Public Art Network Council.

She is a commissioner of the Seattle Design Commission. In 2024, she voted in opposition to replacing a parking garage next to the Pacific Science Center into a 151-unit apartment building, arguing the apartment building will be a "massive presence [that is] missing any articulation that brings delicacy."
