= 7th Avenue/Camelback station =

Light rail station in Phoenix, Arizona

7th Ave/Camelback
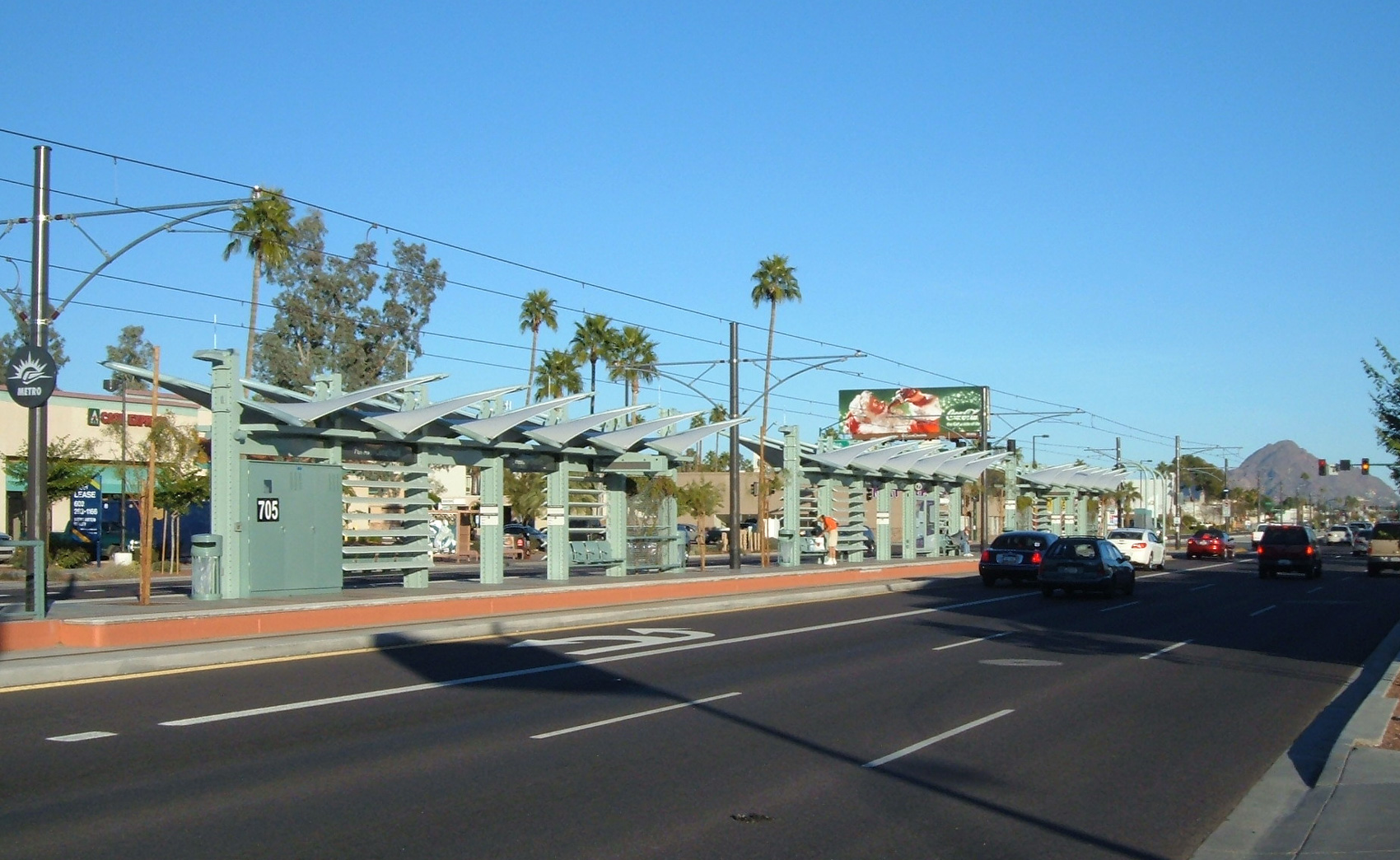
- The station on December 29, 2008

General information
- Other names: Melrose District
- Location: 705 West Camelback Road, Phoenix, Arizona; United States
- Coordinates: 33°30′34″N 112°4′59″W
- Owner: Valley Metro
- Operator: Valley Metro Rail & Streetcar
- Platforms: 1 island platform
- Tracks: 2
- Connections: Valley Metro Bus: 8, 50

Construction
- Structure type: At-grade
- Parking: 123 spaces
- Accessible: Yes

Other information
- Station code: 10003

History
- Opened: December 27, 2008

Passengers
- 2010: 237,004 (weekday boardings)

Services
Preceding station	Valley Metro	Following station
19th Avenue/Camelback toward Metro Parkway	B Line	Central Avenue/Camelback toward Baseline/Central Avenue
Location

7th Avenue/Camelback station, also known as Melrose District for the historic neighborhood, is a station on the B Line of the Valley Metro Rail & Streetcar system in Phoenix, Arizona, United States.

== Notable places nearby ==
- Valley Lutheran High School

== Ridership ==
Weekday rail passengers
Year	In	Out	Average daily in	Average daily out
2009	187,350	193,604	738	762
2010	237,004	250,284	937	989
