= 50th Street/Washington station =

Light rail station in Phoenix, Arizona

50th St/Washington

General information
- Location: Washington Street and 50th Street, Phoenix, Arizona; United States
- Coordinates: 33.446857°N 111.974813°W
- Owner: Valley Metro
- Operator: Valley Metro Rail & Streetcar
- Platforms: 2 side platforms
- Tracks: 2
- Connections: Valley Metro Bus: 1

Construction
- Structure type: At-grade
- Accessible: Yes

Other information
- Station code: 18716

History
- Opened: April 25, 2019

Services
Preceding station	Valley Metro	Following station
44th Street/Washington toward Downtown Phoenix Hub	A Line	Priest Drive/Washington toward Gilbert Road/Main Street
Location

50th Street/Washington station, also known as Ability360, is a light rail station on the A Line of the Valley Metro Rail & Streetcar system in Phoenix, Arizona. It is between 44th Street/Washington and Center Pkwy/Washington stations. The station consists of a set side platforms that are located on an island in the median of Washington Street.

== Background ==
The station was built as an infill project to serve the Ability360 recreation center and include disability-friendly features that go beyond federal requirements, such as a more gradual slope and wider platforms.

The station opened on April 25, 2019, and cost $22.9 million using funds derived from a light rail initiative passed in 2015.

== Connections ==
Valley Metro Bus	Route number	Route name	North/east end	South/west end
Valley Metro Bus	1	Washington Street	Priest Drive/Washington Street	Van Buren Street/Central Avenue/Polk Street
