= Stapley/Main Street station =

Light rail station in Mesa, Arizona

Stapley Dr/Main St

General information
- Location: Main Street and Stapley Drive, Mesa, Arizona; United States
- Coordinates: 33.415218°N 111.80443°W
- Owner: Valley Metro
- Operator: Valley Metro Rail & Streetcar
- Platforms: 1 island platform
- Tracks: 2
- Connections: Valley Metro Bus: 40, 128

Construction
- Structure type: At-grade
- Accessible: Yes

Other information
- Station code: 18177

History
- Opened: May 18, 2019

Services
Preceding station	Valley Metro	Following station
Mesa Drive/Main Street toward Downtown Phoenix Hub	A Line	Gilbert Road/Main Street Terminus
Location

Stapley/Main Street station is a light rail station in Mesa, Arizona, on the A Line of the Valley Metro Rail & Streetcar system serving Phoenix and surrounding areas. It is part of the 1.9-mile (3.1 km) Gilbert Road Extension, alongside Gilbert Road/Main Street station, and opened to passengers on May 18, 2019. The station consists of one island platform located in the median of Main Street to the east of Stapley Drive.

== Connections ==
Valley Metro Bus	Route number	Route name	North/east end	South/west end
Valley Metro Bus	40	Main Street	Superstition Springs Transit Center	Sycamore/Main Street Transit Center
Valley Metro Bus	128	Stapley Drive	McKellips Road/Stapley Drive	Inverness Avenue/Stapley Drive
