= 19th Avenue/Camelback station =

Light rail station in Phoenix, Arizona

19th Ave/Camelback
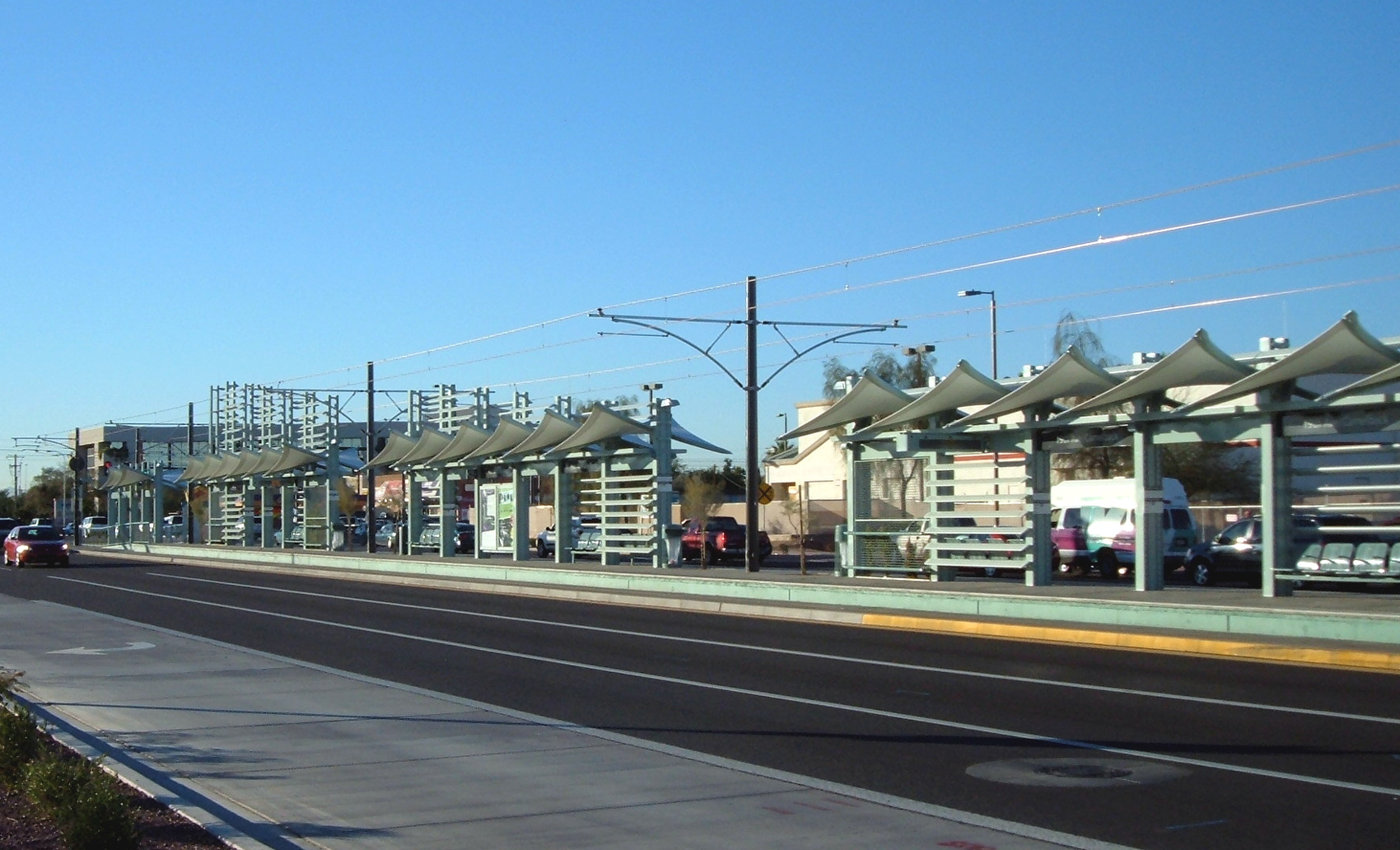
- The station on December 29, 2008

General information
- Location: 1855 West Camelback Road, Phoenix, Arizona; United States
- Coordinates: 33°30′35″N 112°5′56″W
- Owner: Valley Metro
- Operator: Valley Metro Rail & Streetcar
- Platforms: 1 island platform
- Tracks: 2
- Connections: Valley Metro Bus: 19, 50

Construction
- Structure type: At-grade
- Parking: 411 spaces
- Accessible: Yes

Other information
- Station code: 10002

History
- Opened: December 27, 2008

Passengers
- 2010: 409,794 (weekday boardings)

Services
| Preceding station | Valley Metro | Following station |
|---|---|---|
| Montebello/19th Avenue toward Metro Parkway | B Line | 7th Avenue/Camelback toward Baseline/Central Avenue |
Location

19th Avenue/Camelback station is a station on the B Line of the Valley Metro Rail & Streetcar system in Uptown Phoenix, Arizona, United States. A park and ride lot is adjacent to the station on the south side of Camelback Road.

== Station art ==
The 19th Avenue/Camelback station features art by Josh Garber:

"This landmark is approximately 30 feet tall, with an aluminum "skin" on the outside made from cut segments of aluminum bars. Fiber optic lights under the skin transform the sculpture into an inviting beacon at night."

== Notable places nearby ==
- Camelback Medical Plaza
- International District
- YMCA

== Ridership ==
Weekday rail passengers
| Year | In | Out | Average daily in | Average daily out |
|---|---|---|---|---|
| 2009 | 291,383 | 251,443 | 1,147 | 990 |
| 2010 | 409,794 | 395,727 | 1,620 | 1,564 |
| 2022 | | | 917 | 943 |
