= Mesa Drive/Main Street station =

Light rail station in Mesa, Arizona

Mesa Dr/Main St
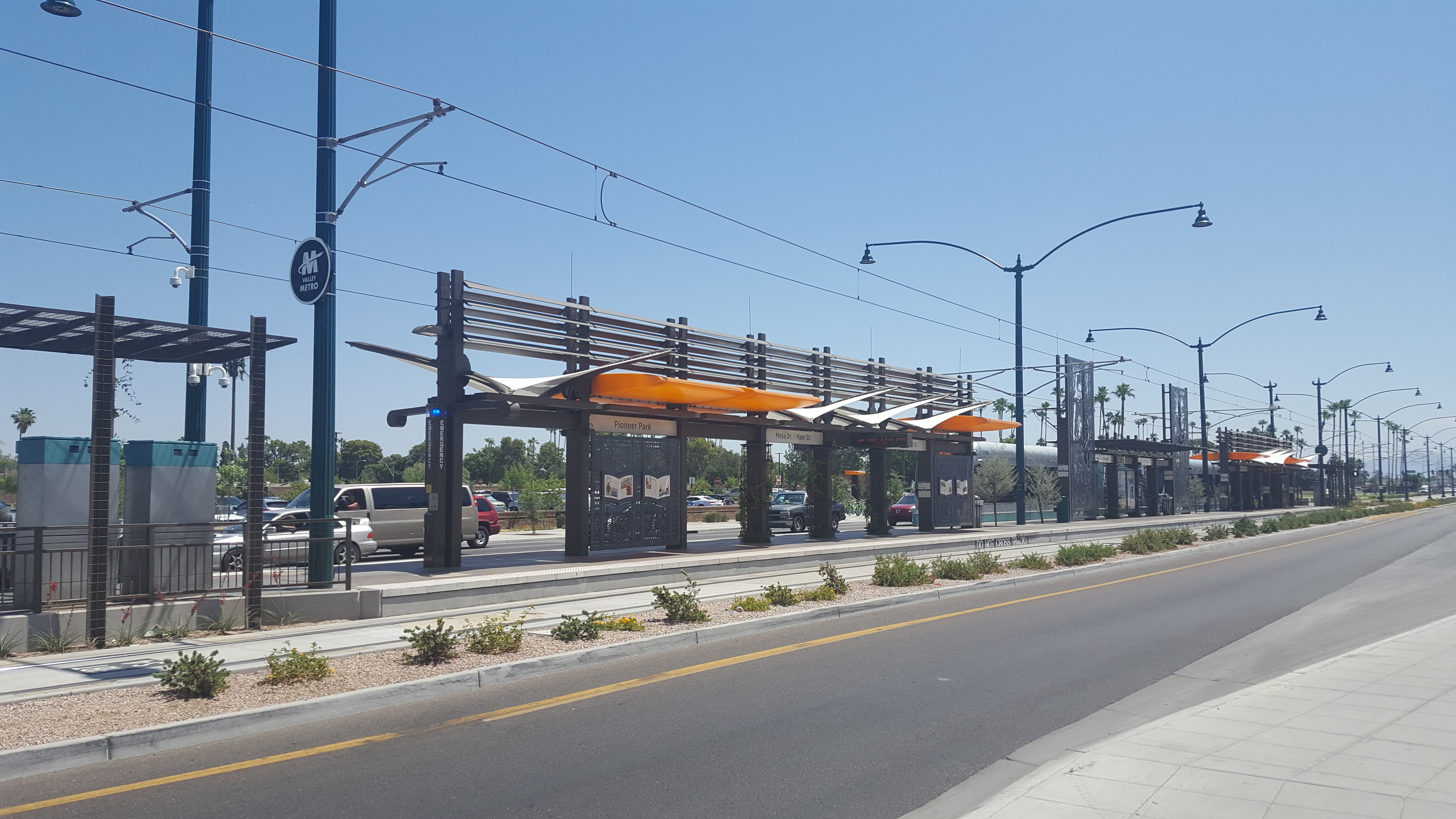

General information
- Other names: Pioneer Park
- Location: Main Street and Mesa Drive, Mesa, Arizona; United States
- Coordinates: 33°24′54.24″N 111°49′19.79″W
- Owner: Valley Metro
- Operator: Valley Metro Rail & Streetcar
- Platforms: 1 island platform
- Tracks: 2
- Connections: Valley Metro Bus: 40, 120

Construction
- Structure type: At-grade
- Parking: 448 spaces
- Accessible: Yes

Other information
- Station code: 18603

History
- Opened: August 22, 2015

Services
Preceding station	Valley Metro	Following station
Center/Main Street toward Downtown Phoenix Hub	A Line	Stapley/Main Street toward Gilbert Road/Main Street
Location

Mesa Drive/Main Street station, also known as Pioneer Park, is a station on the A Line of the Valley Metro Rail & Streetcar system in Mesa, Arizona, United States. The station is located one block east of the intersection of East Main Street and North Mesa Drive, and opened as part of the Central Mesa Extension on August 22, 2015. The station consists of one island platform in the median of Main Street. It served as the eastbound terminus of the line until the Gilbert Road Extension opened in late Spring 2019.

== Nearby landmarks ==
- Eastern end of Downtown Mesa
- Pioneer Park
- Mesa Arizona Temple
- Mesa Municipal Court

== Connections ==
Valley Metro Bus	Route number	Route name	North/east end	South/west end
Valley Metro Bus	40	Main Street	Superstition Springs Transit Center	Sycamore/Main Street Transit Center
Valley Metro Bus	120	Mesa Drive	Fitch Park	Lewis Court/Coury Drive
