= Montebello/19th Avenue station =

Light rail station in Phoenix, Arizona

Montebello/19th Ave
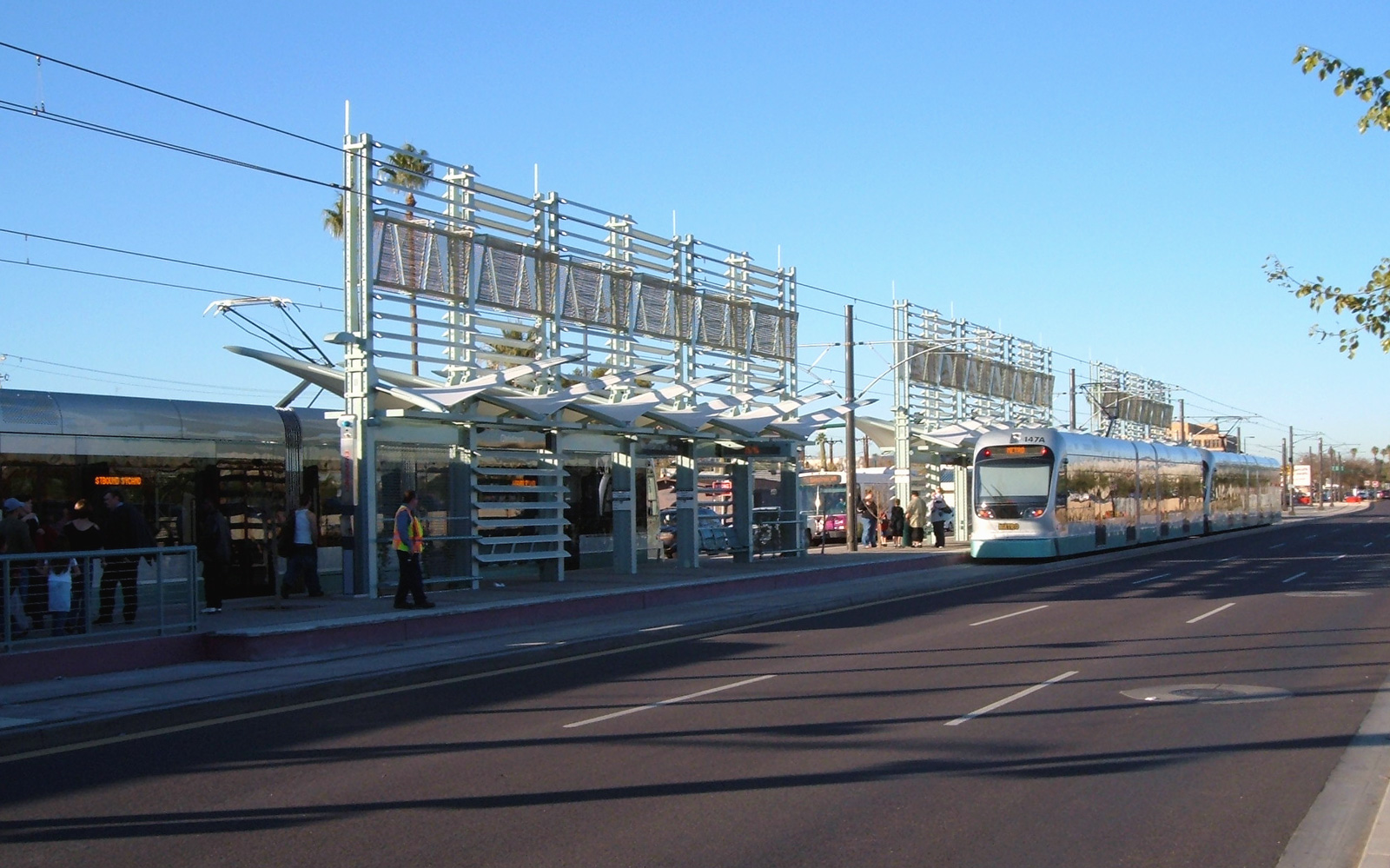
- The station on December 29, 2008

General information
- Other names: Christown
- Location: 5645 North 19th Avenue, Phoenix, Arizona; United States
- Coordinates: 33°31′13″N 112°5′59″W
- Owner: Valley Metro
- Operator: Valley Metro Rail & Streetcar
- Platforms: 1 island platform
- Tracks: 2
- Connections: Valley Metro Bus: 19, 50

Construction
- Structure type: At-grade
- Parking: 794 spaces
- Cycle facilities: 8 racks
- Accessible: Yes

Other information
- Station code: 10001

History
- Opened: December 27, 2008

Passengers
- 2010: 852,905 (weekday boardings)

Services
Preceding station	Valley Metro	Following station
Glendale/19th Avenue toward Metro Parkway	B Line	19th Avenue/Camelback toward Baseline/Central Avenue
Location

Montebello/19th Avenue station, also known as Christown, is a station on the B Line of the Valley Metro Rail & Streetcar system in Phoenix, Arizona, United States. A large park and ride lot is located on the east side of 19th Avenue. The station is immediately south of Bethany Home Road. The station was the northern terminus of the Valley Metro Rail until the Northwest Extension I opened in 2016.

== Notable places nearby ==
- Christown Spectrum Mall
- Abrazo Central Campus

== Ridership ==
Weekday rail passengers
Year	In	Out	Average daily in	Average daily out
2009	783,372	818,930	3,084	3,224
2010	852,905	870,143	3,371	3,439
2022			1,014	1,029
