= Central Avenue/Camelback station =

Light rail station in Phoenix, Arizona

Central Ave/Camelback
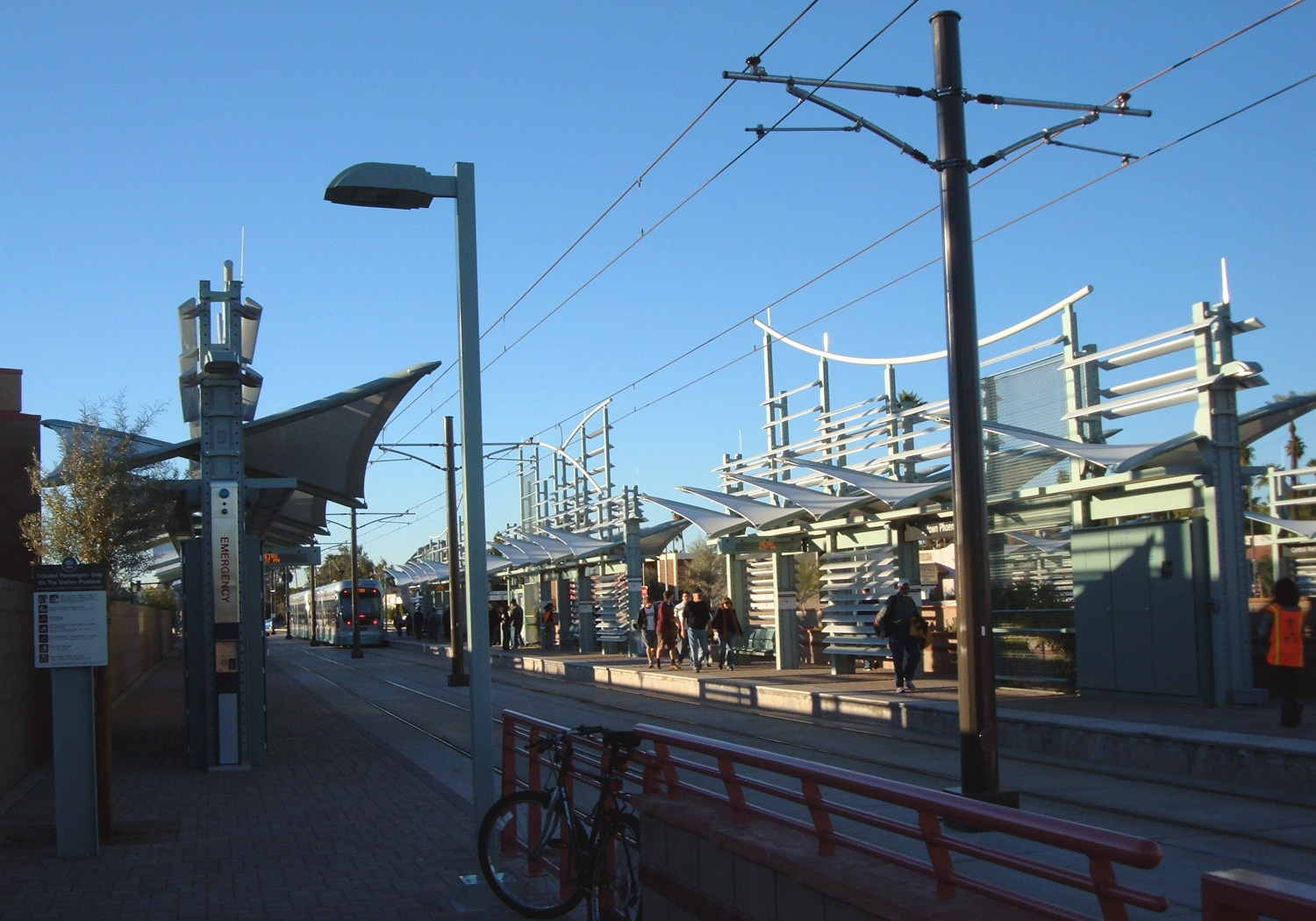
- The station in December 2008

General information
- Other names: Uptown Phoenix
- Location: 4850 North Central Avenue, Phoenix, Arizona; United States
- Coordinates: 33°30′31″N 112°4′30″W
- Owner: Valley Metro
- Operator: Valley Metro Rail & Streetcar
- Platforms: 1 island platform
- Tracks: 2
- Connections: Valley Metro Bus: 0, 50

Construction
- Structure type: At-grade
- Parking: 135 spaces
- Accessible: Yes

Other information
- Station code: 10004

History
- Opened: December 27, 2008

Passengers
- 2010: 192,829 (weekday boardings)

Services
Preceding station	Valley Metro	Following station
7th Avenue/Camelback toward Metro Parkway	B Line	Campbell/Central Avenue toward Baseline/Central Avenue
Location

Central Avenue/Camelback station, also known as Uptown Phoenix, is a station on the B Line of the Valley Metro Rail & Streetcar system in uptown Phoenix, Arizona, United States. This station has a park and ride lot adjacent to and west of the station, along Camelback Road.

== Notable places nearby ==
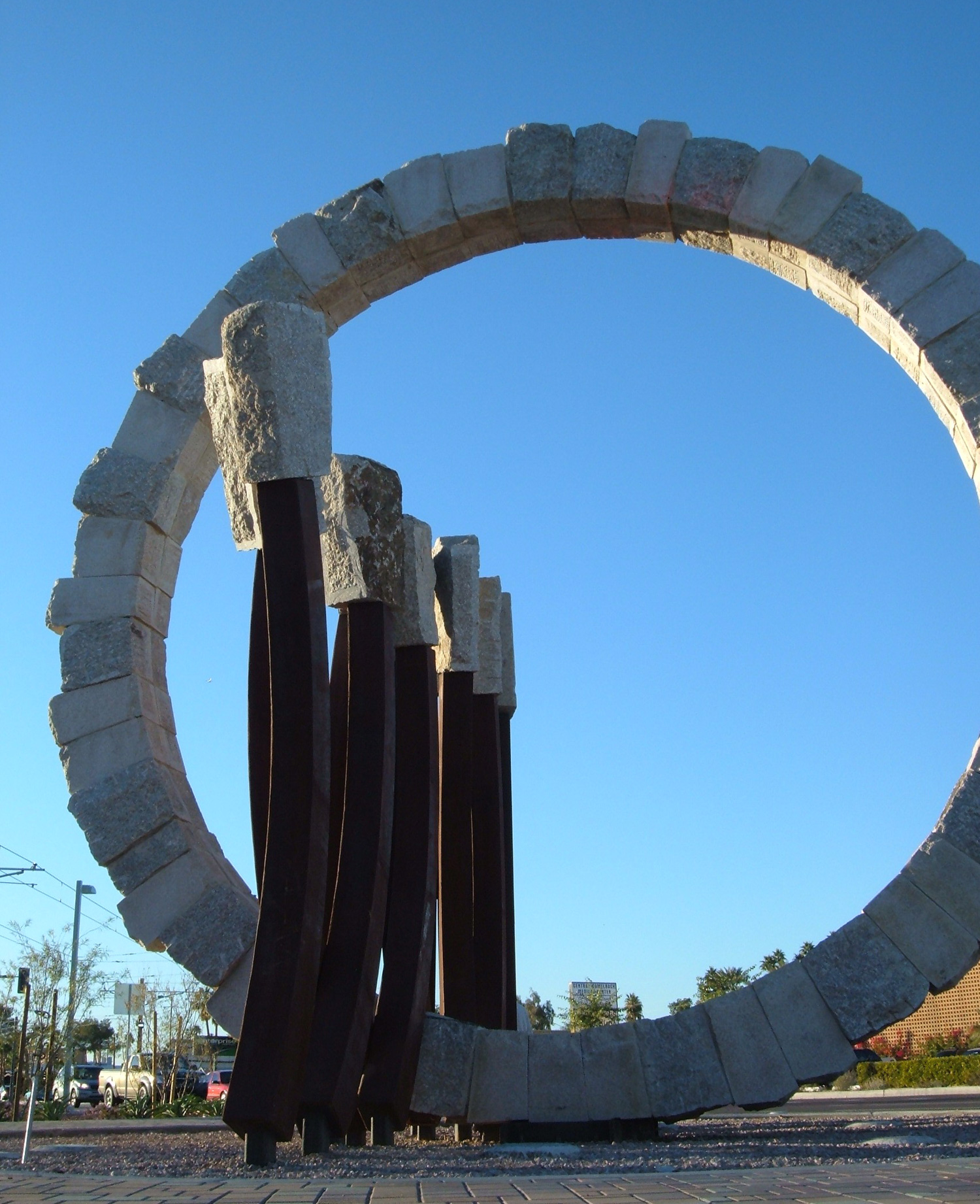
Artwork sculpture Landmark (The Crossing) by Ilan Averbuch at Uptown Phoenix station

- Brophy College Preparatory
- Central High School
- Uptown Plaza
- Xavier College Preparatory

== Ridership ==
Weekday rail passengers
Year	In	Out	Average daily in	Average daily out
2009	107,023	151,256	421	595
2010	192,829	195,075	762	771
