= Dorsey/Apache Boulevard station =

Light rail and streetcar station in Tempe, Arizona

Dorsey Ln/Apache Blvd
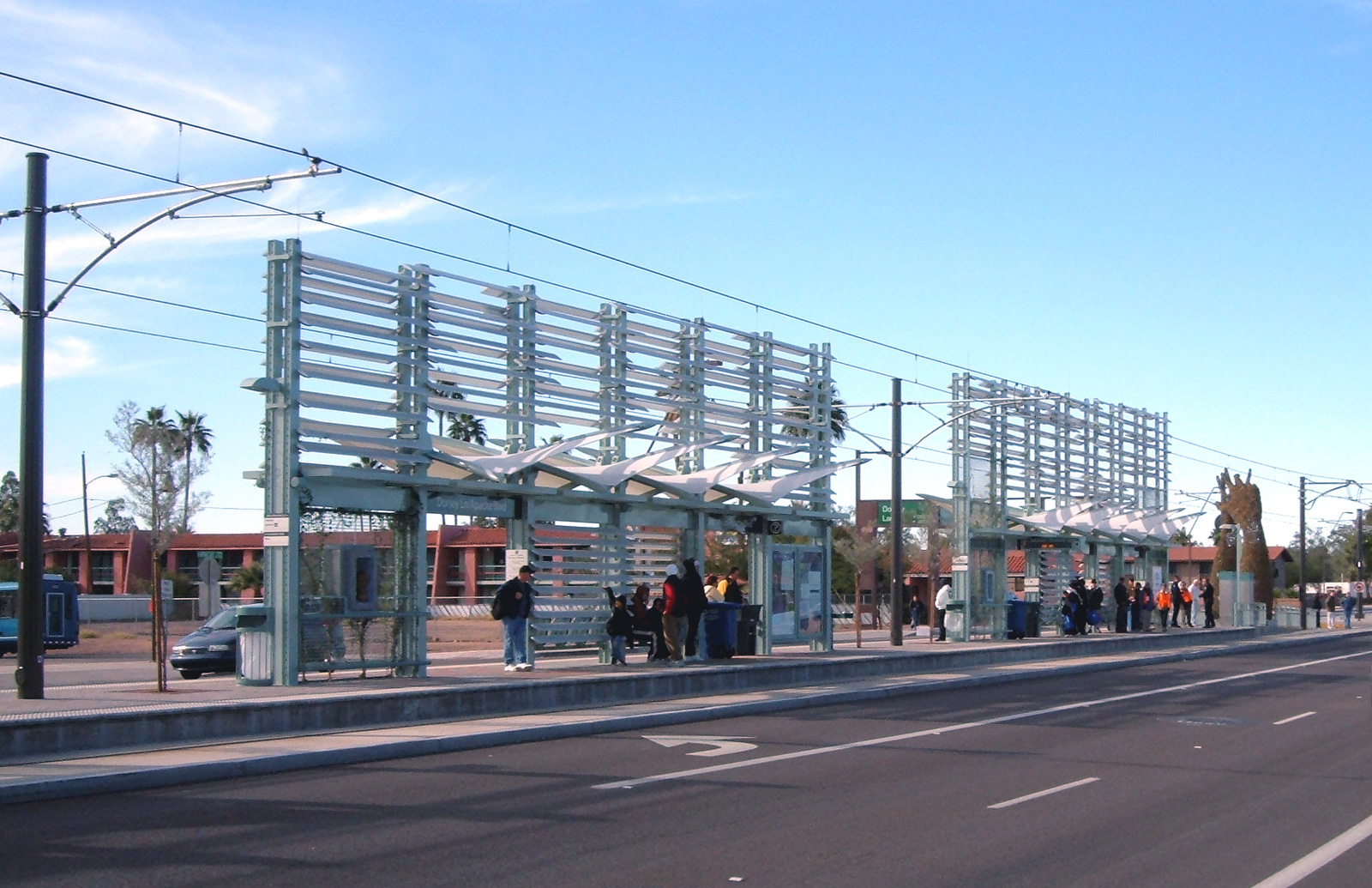
- The station during its first day of service on December 27, 2008

General information
- Location: Apache Boulevard and Dorsey Lane, Tempe, Arizona; United States
- Coordinates: 33°24′53.25″N 111°55′2″W
- Owner: Valley Metro
- Operator: Valley Metro Rail & Streetcar
- Platforms: 2 (1 island, 1 side)
- Tracks: 3
- Connections: Valley Metro Bus: Tempe Orbit Mars

Construction
- Structure type: At-grade
- Accessible: Yes

Other information
- Station code: 10024

History
- Opened: December 27, 2008 (A Line); May 20, 2022 (S Line)

Passengers
- 2021: 370 daily (weekday) ▼44.78%

Services
Preceding station	Valley Metro	Following station
University Drive/Rural toward Downtown Phoenix Hub	A Line	McClintock/Apache Boulevard toward Gilbert Road/Main Street
Rural/Apache Boulevard toward Marina Heights/Rio Salado Parkway	S Line	Terminus
Location

Dorsey/Apache Boulevard station is a station on the A and S lines of the Valley Metro Rail & Streetcar system in Tempe, Arizona, United States. The station consists of one island platform for the A Line and one side platform for the S Line, all located in the median of Apache Boulevard to the east of Dorsey Lane. A surface park and ride lot is available on the north side of Apache Boulevard.

Following the opening of the S Line on May 20, 2022, the station serves as the eastern terminus and a transit point between the A Line and the S Line. S Line streetcars arrive and depart from the side platform to the south, whilst A Line trains continue to arrive and depart from the island platform to the north.

The park and ride adjacent to the station containing 190 spaces permanently closed on May 29, 2026 to accommodate housing redevelopment by the City of Tempe.

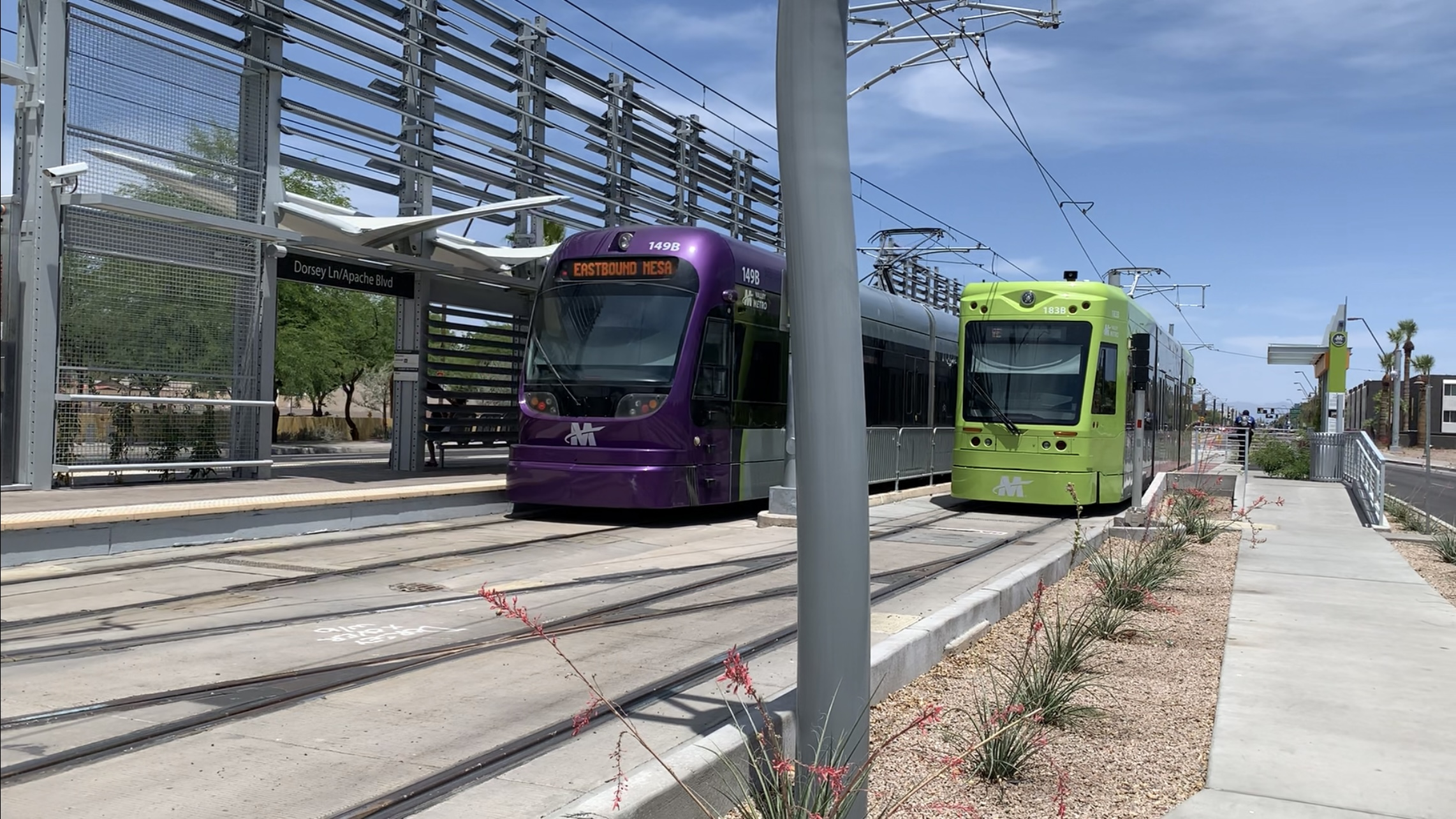
Valley Metro Rail Kinki Sharyo LRV 149 and Brookville Liberty Streetcar 183 idle at Dorsey Ln/Apache Blvd.

== Ridership ==
Weekday rail passengers
Year	In	Out	Average daily in	Average daily out
2009	189,242	175,662	745	692
2010	211,310	201,355	835	796

== Notable places nearby ==
- The New School for the Arts and Academics (NSAA)

== Connections ==
Valley Metro Bus	Route number	Route name	North/east end	South/west end	
Valley Metro Bus	MARS	Tempe Orbit Mars	Tempe Transportation Center	Southern Avenue/ Evergreen Road	Broadway Road/ Dorsey Lane
Valley Metro Bus	MERC	Tempe Orbit Mercury	Tempe Transportation Center	Escalante Center	McClintock Road/8th Street
