= Priest Drive/Washington station =

Light rail station in Tempe, Arizona

Priest Dr/Washington St
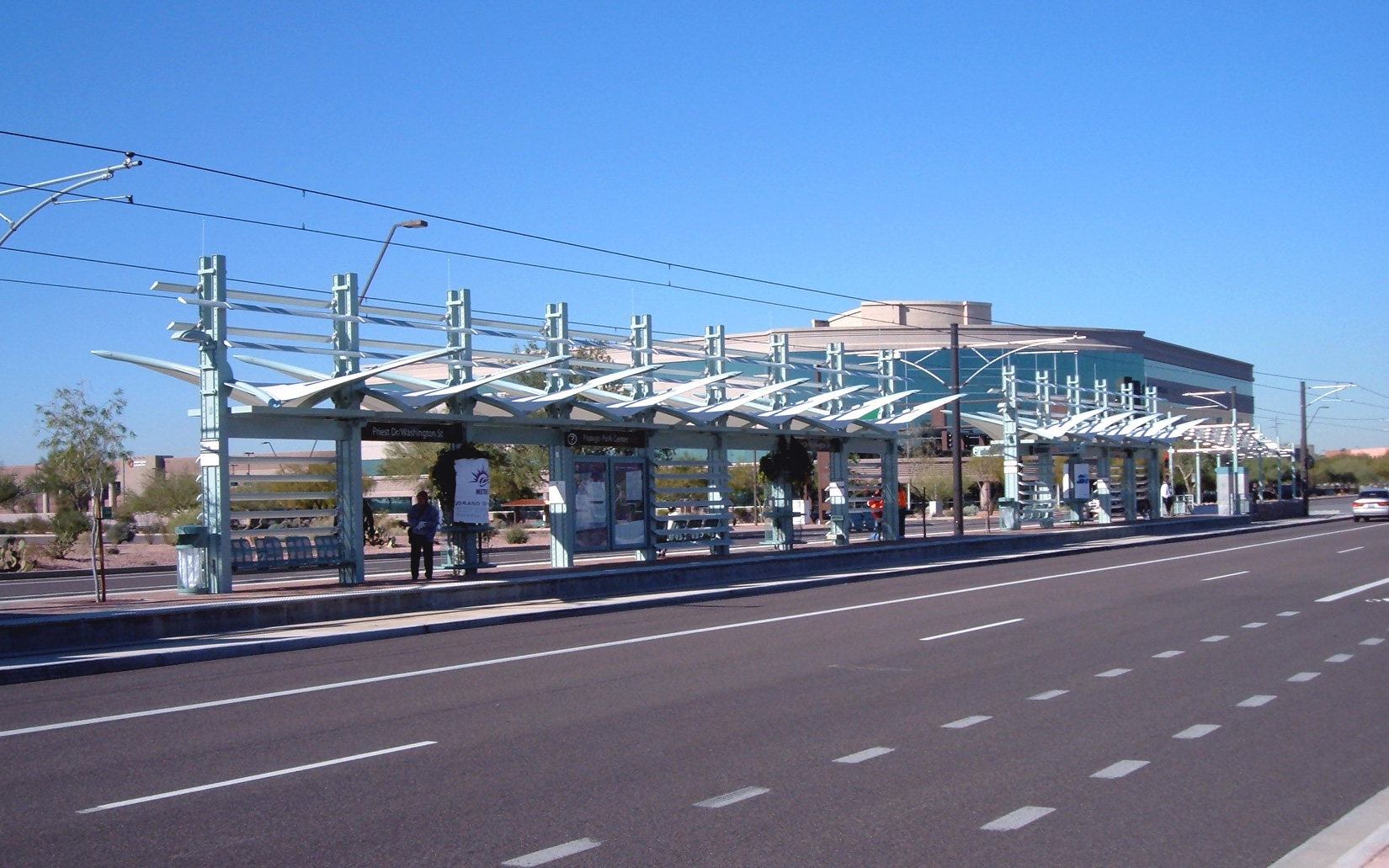
- The station in December 2008

General information
- Other names: Papago Park Center
- Location: Washington Street and Priest Drive, Tempe, Arizona; United States
- Coordinates: 33°26′32″N 111°57′22″W
- Owner: Valley Metro
- Operator: Valley Metro Rail & Streetcar
- Platforms: 1 island platform
- Tracks: 2
- Connections: Valley Metro Bus: 1, 56

Construction
- Structure type: At-grade
- Accessible: Yes

Other information
- Station code: 10019

History
- Opened: December 27, 2008

Services
Preceding station	Valley Metro	Following station
50th Street/Washington toward Downtown Phoenix Hub	A Line	Center Parkway/Washington toward Gilbert Road/Main Street
Location

Priest Drive/Washington station, also known as Papago Park Center, is a light rail station on the A Line of the Valley Metro Rail & Streetcar system in Tempe, Arizona, United States. The station consists of one island platform in the median of Washington Street to the east of Priest Drive. Some early-morning and late-night trains start and end their service to and from Gilbert Road/Main Street station here, respectively.

== Ridership ==
Weekday rail passengers
Year	In	Out	Average daily in	Average daily out
2009	257,346	250,432	1,013	986
2010	350,647	342,875	1,386	1,355

== Notable places nearby ==
- Papago Park
- Phoenix Zoo
- Desert Botanical Garden
- Phoenix Municipal Stadium
- Hall of Flame Fire Museum

== Connections ==
Valley Metro Bus	Route number	Route name	North/east end		South/west end	
Valley Metro Bus	1	Washington Street	Terminus		Van Buren Street/Central Avenue/Polk Street	
Valley Metro Bus	56	Priest Drive	Desert Botanical Garden	Terminus (select trips)	Ray Road/48th Street	Elliot Road/Priest Drive (select weekday trips)
