= Center Parkway/Washington station =

Light rail station in Tempe, Arizona

Center Pkwy/Washington
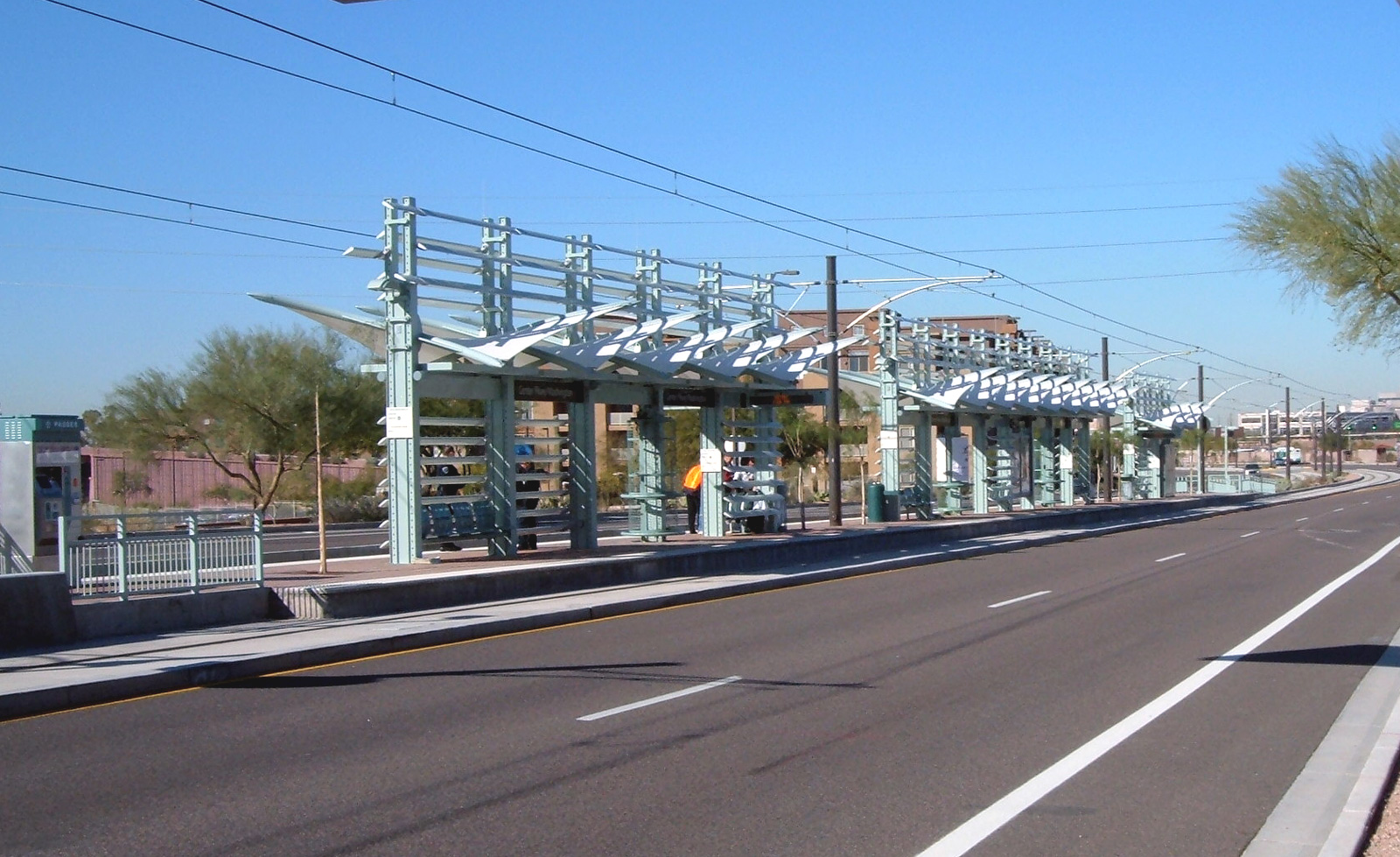
- The station in December 2008

General information
- Location: Washington Street east of Center Parkway, Tempe, Arizona; United States
- Coordinates: 33°26′17.25″N 111°56′48.25″W
- Owner: Valley Metro
- Operator: Valley Metro Rail & Streetcar
- Platforms: 1 island platform
- Tracks: 2

Construction
- Structure type: At-grade
- Accessible: Yes

Other information
- Station code: 10020

History
- Opened: December 27, 2008

Services
Preceding station	Valley Metro	Following station
Priest Drive/Washington toward Downtown Phoenix Hub	A Line	Mill Avenue/3rd Street toward Gilbert Road/Main Street
Location

Center Parkway/Washington station is a light rail station on the A Line of the Valley Metro Rail & Streetcar system in Tempe, Arizona, United States. It consists of one island platform located in the median of Washington Street, north of Tempe Town Lake.

== Ridership ==
Weekday rail passengers
Year	In	Out	Average daily in	Average daily out
2009	71,547	62,695	282	247
2010	65,991	63,567	261	251

== Notable places nearby ==
- Salt River Project complex
- Grand Canalscape
- Marquee Theatre
- Bryan University
- Papago Park
