= Valley Metro Rail & Streetcar =

Light rail system in Phoenix, Arizona

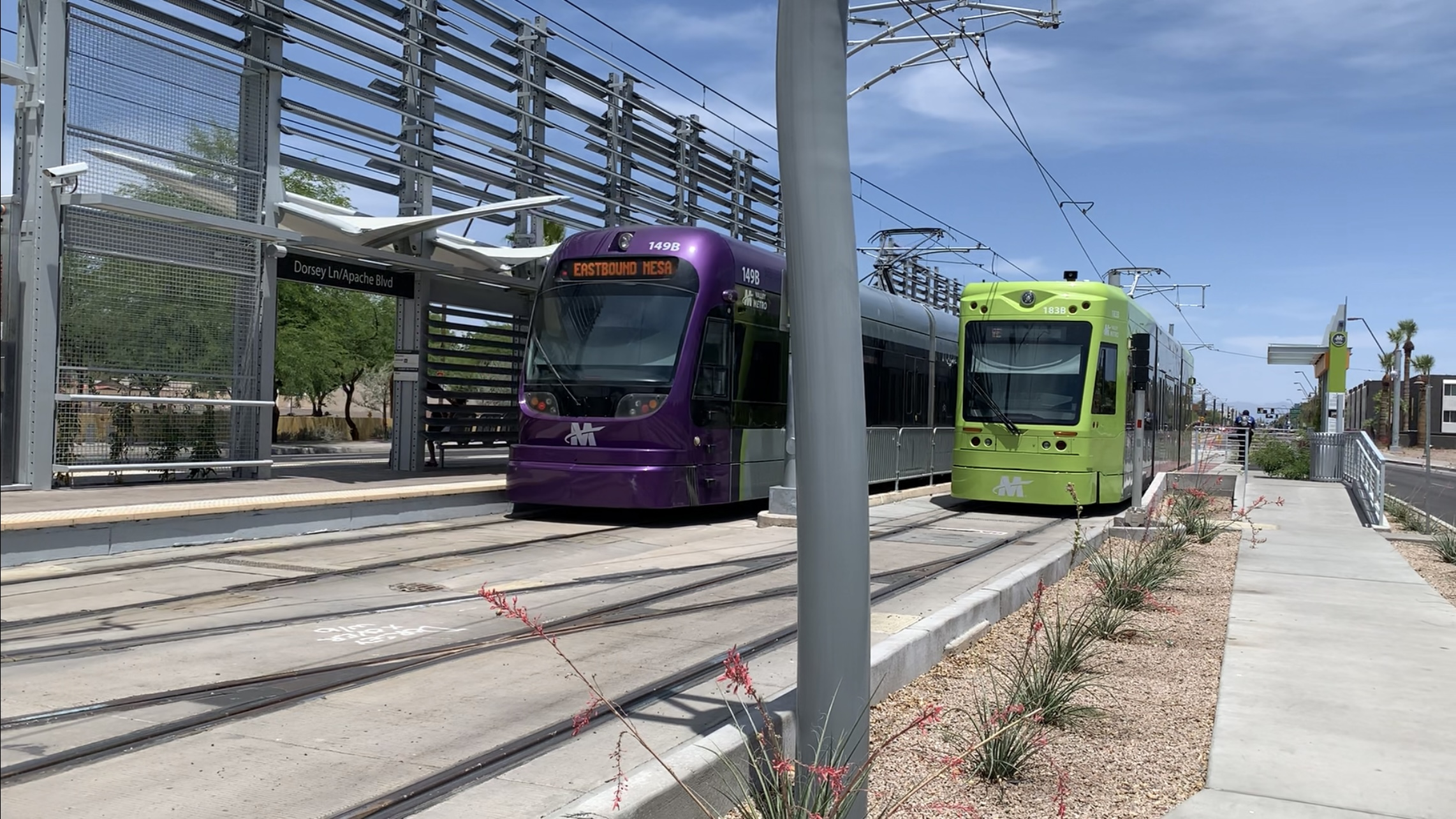
- A Line train and S Line streetcar at Dorsey/Apache Boulevard station

Overview
- Owner: Valley Metro
- Locale: Phoenix metropolitan area
- Transit type: Light rail; Streetcar
- Number of lines: 3
- Number of stations: 54 (light rail); 14 (streetcar)
- Daily ridership: 33,700 (weekdays, Q2 2026)
- Annual ridership: 11,100,300 (2025)
- Website: www.valleymetro.org/rail

Operation
- Began operation: December 27, 2008
- Operators: Alternate Concepts, Inc.
- Character: At-grade, elevated
- Rolling stock: Kinki Sharyo Low Floor LRV; Siemens S700; Liberty Streetcar
- Headway: 12–20 minutes (A Line, B Line); 15–20 minutes (S Line)

Technical
- System length: 38 mi (61 km)
- No. of tracks: 2
- Track gauge: 4 ft 8 1/2 in (1,435 mm) standard gauge
- Electrification: Overhead line, 750 V DC
System map
Valley Metro Rail & Streetcar systems highlighted
A Line
B Line
S Line
Light rail
Streetcar
Key

Valley Metro Rail & Streetcar is a 35-mile (56 km) light rail and 3-mile (5 km) streetcar system serving the Phoenix metropolitan area in Arizona, United States. The network, part of the Valley Metro system, comprises three lines: the east–west A Line between Phoenix and Mesa; the north–south B Line entirely within Phoenix; and the S Line streetcar in Tempe. The light rail lines have 54 total stations, while the streetcar serves 14 stations. In 2025, the system had a ridership of 11,100,300, or about 33,700 per weekday as of the second quarter of 2026.

The light rail system is primarily at-grade with an exclusive lane and some elevated sections, while the streetcar portions are in shared traffic. The first section was funded by a 2000 sales tax across Maricopa County and opened on December 27, 2008, with 32 stations in Phoenix and Mesa. Valley Metro Rail & Streetcar has been expanded seven times since the first section opened, with projects ranging from a single infill station to eight stations on the South Central Extension in 2025. The S Line in Tempe opened in 2022 and uses a separate rolling stock from the rest of the system. Extensions of the system, made possible by Prop 104 and funded by Prop 479, include an extension of the S Line into Mesa planned to open this decade, and a new line into West Phoenix is planned to open in 2037 while other projects are in planning or suspended.

== Lines ==
In Valley Metro terminology, common with most other metro systems, a line is a named service, defined by a route and set of stations served by trains on that route.

Line name	Stations	Termini		Type
Line name	Stations	Western/Northern	Eastern/Southern	Type
A Line	26	Downtown Phoenix Hub	Gilbert Road/Main Street	Light rail
B Line	29	Metro Parkway	Baseline/Central Avenue	Light rail
S Line	14	Marina Heights/Rio Salado Parkway	Dorsey/Apache Boulevard	Streetcar

== History ==
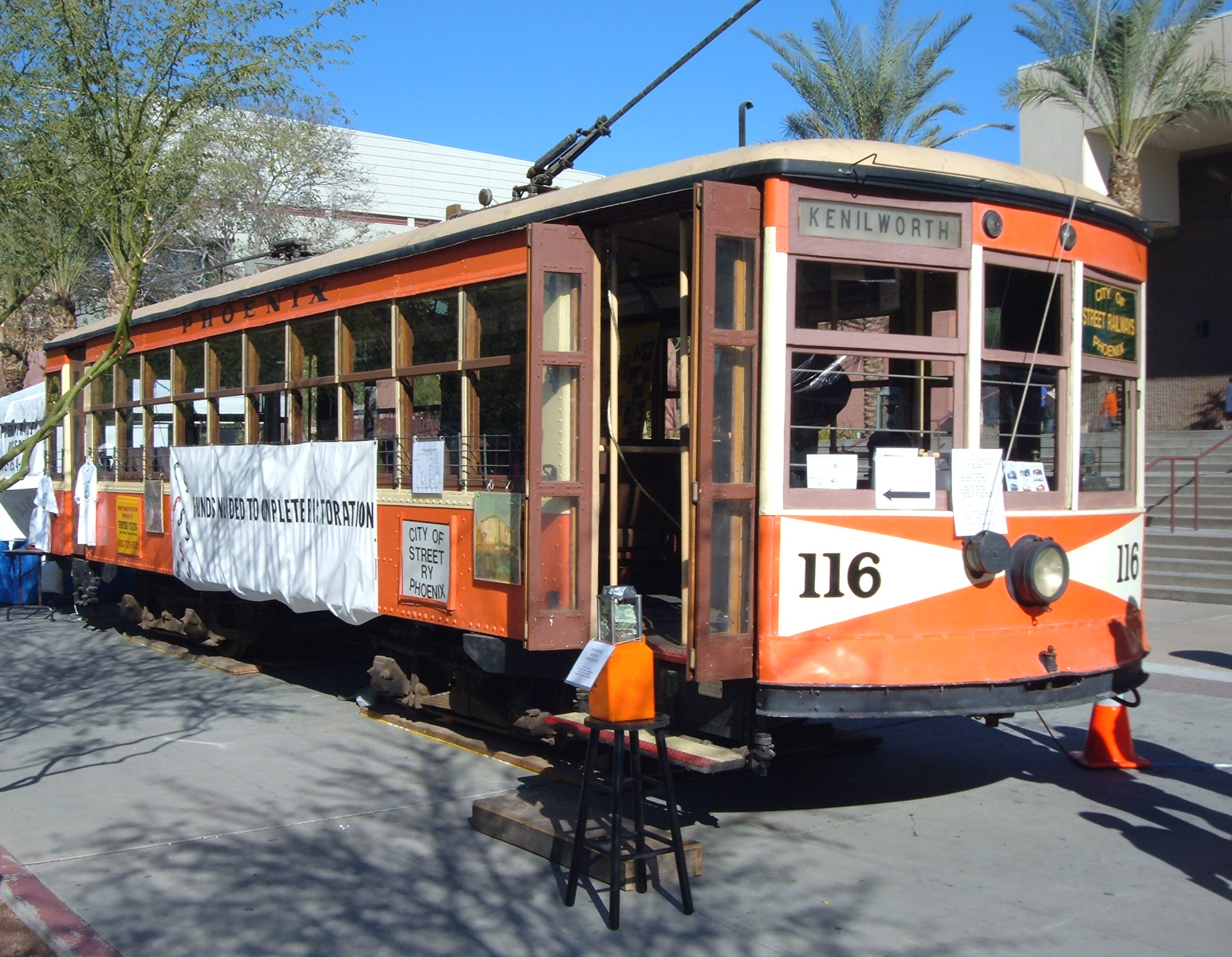
The restored 1928 trolley served the original Phoenix trolley system from 1928 to 1947.

=== Background ===
Numerous plans preceded the implementation of light rail. The Phoenix Street Railway provided streetcar service from 1887 to 1948. Historic vehicles may be seen at the Phoenix Trolley Museum, with Car #116 celebrating her 80th birthday on December 25, 2008, just days before the opening of modern rail service. In 1989, the ValTrans elevated rail proposal was turned down by voters in a referendum due to cost and feasibility concerns. Subsequent initiatives during the 1990s failed over similar reasons.

Valley Metro was created by the Transit 2000 Regional Transportation Plan (RTP), also called the Transit 2000 plan, which involved a half-cent sales tax, and was approved by Phoenix voters in 2000. Transit 2000 aimed at improving the local bus service (considered unacceptably inadequate compared to other major US cities) and adding new bus rapid transit routes. It used the route placing and color designations from the 1989 ValTrans plan. The plan also called for a new light rail line to be built throughout the Phoenix metropolitan area, resuming rail transit service that was absent since the 1940s. Additional funding for the new rail line was secured in 2004 when residents approved Proposition 400, extending the half-cent countywide sales tax.

=== Initial segment ===
Construction on the new light rail line began in March 2005. The expected construction cost for the line was $1.4 billion, or $70 million per mile (equivalent to $2.21 billion or $111 million per mile in 2025 dollars). The line's initial twenty-mile (32 km) segment consisted of 28 stations running between Phoenix and Mesa. In March 2008, cracks in the system's rails were discovered. The cause of the cracks was determined to be improper use of plasma cutting torches by contractors. The affected track was repaired by May for $600,000 with no statement on which parties would be held financially responsible. The last of the concrete and rail for the system was installed in the end of April, with the CEO declaring the system to be on time and on budget.

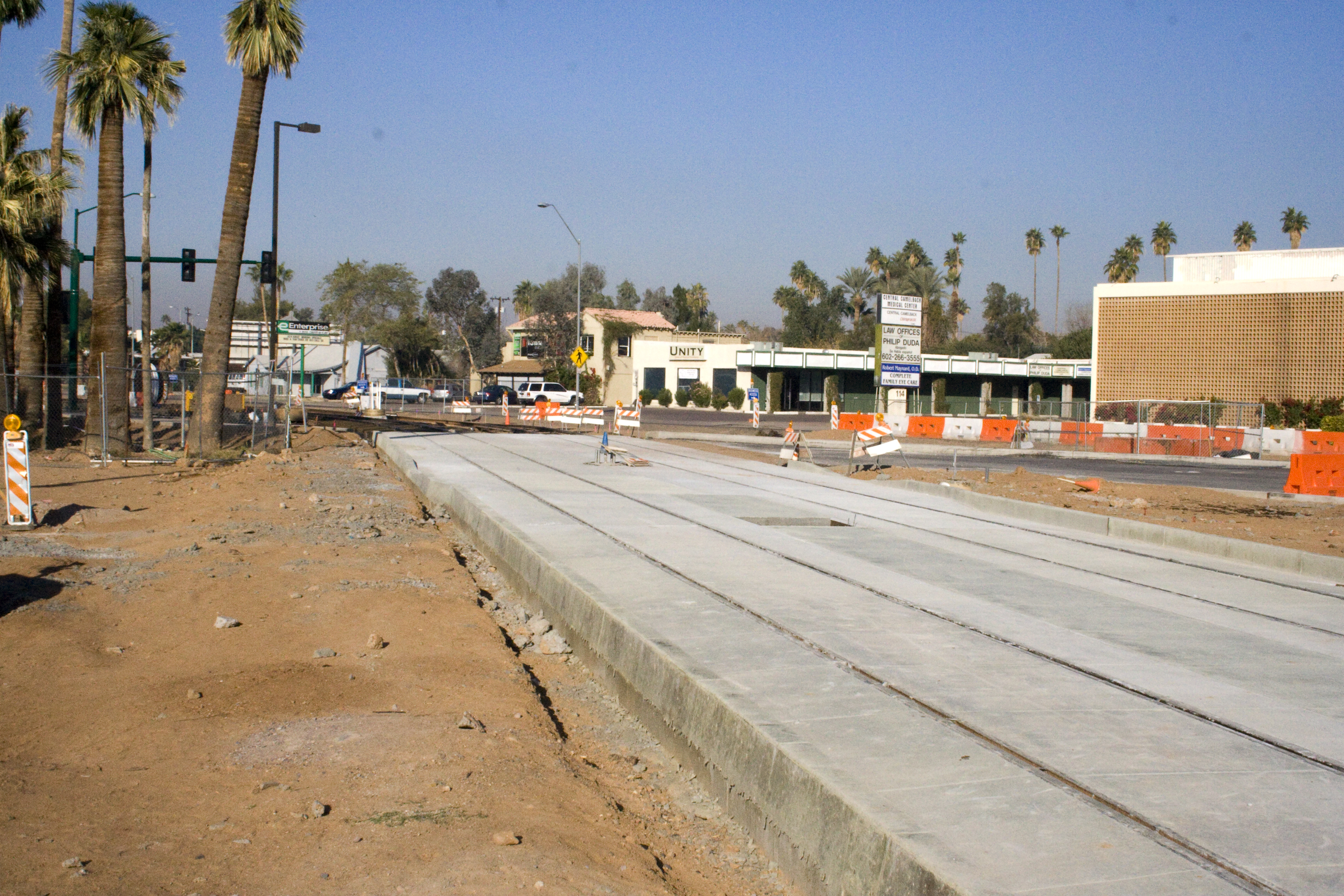
Construction on the initial light rail segment, 2007

The line opened at 9:10 a.m. on December 27, 2008, with official ribbon-cutting ceremonies and community celebrations throughout Phoenix, Tempe, and Mesa. The opening day had 90,000 passenger trips, with some riders waiting as long as 2.5 hours to ride the trains. The stations were designed to complement their immediate surroundings. Station platform areas are approximately 16 feet (4.9 m) wide by 300 feet (91 m) long.

As of early 2014, income had exceeded Metro's stated goal with 44.6% farebox recovery, partially due to the light rail ridership far exceeding original projections.

The light rail has also led to rapid urban development in downtown Phoenix and Tempe, generating additional revenue through taxes.

Valley Metro had its busiest month in April 2017, with a total passenger count of 1,514,456 and an average weekday ridership of 52,910. On the weekend of March 31, 2017, through April 2, 2017, the light rail system saw 275,615 passengers board the train due to several large events including Final Four Fan Fest, March Madness Music Festival, Arizona Diamondbacks home opener, Phoenix Pride Festival, Phoenix Suns game, and Tempe Festival of the Arts. That Sunday, April 2, 2017, they saw 80,210 passengers board the train due to those large events.

Segment description	Date opened	Standing line(s) on segment	Endpoints	Number of new stations	Length (miles)	Construction cost
Central Phoenix/East Valley Light Rail Line	December 27, 2008	A Line (Valley Metro) B Line (Valley Metro)	Montebello/19th Avenue – Sycamore/Main Street	28	20	$1.4 billion
Central Mesa Extension	August 22, 2015	A Line (Valley Metro)	Sycamore/Main Street – Mesa Drive/Main Street	4	3.1	$200 million
Northwest Extension Phase I	March 19, 2016	B Line (Valley Metro)	Montebello/19th Avenue – 19th Avenue/Dunlap	3	3.2	$267 million
50th Street infill station	April 25, 2019	A Line (Valley Metro)	50th Street/Washington	1 (Note: Infill station on the A Line between 44th Street/Washington and Priest Drive/Washington)	–	$22.9 million
Gilbert Road Extension	May 18, 2019	A Line (Valley Metro)	Mesa Drive/Main Street – Gilbert Road/Main Street	2	1.9	$184 million
Tempe Streetcar	May 20, 2022	S Line (Valley Metro)	Marina Heights/Rio Solado Parkway – Dorsey/Apache Boulevard	14	3	$192 million
Northwest Extension Phase II	January 27, 2024	B Line (Valley Metro)	Metro Parkway – 19th Avenue/Dunlap	3	1.6	$401 million
South Central Extension	June 7, 2025	A Line (Valley Metro) B Line (Valley Metro)	Downtown Phoenix Hub – Baseline/Central Avenue	8	5.5	$1.34 billion
Total				50	38.5	$3.63 billion

=== Central Mesa Extension ===
The Central Mesa Extension extended rail service 3.1 miles (5.0 km) from the line's original eastern terminus at Sycamore/Main Street to Mesa Drive/Main Street. It added four new stations in the median of Main Street at Alma School Road, Country Club Drive, Center Street, and Mesa Drive, bringing rail service directly to Downtown Mesa. In March 2012, Valley Metro selected a design-build joint venture between Kiewit Corporation and Mass. Electric to construct the extension.

Construction began in July 2012 and passenger service started on August 22, 2015. Mesa held a summit in early 2012 to have urban developers give their ideas on how to revitalize downtown. The extension cost $200 million (equivalent to $265 million in 2025 dollars) paid for from a combination of Proposition 400 sales tax revenues, federal air quality, and New Starts grants. It is estimated to have added 5,000 daily riders.

=== Northwest Extension Phase I ===
In 2016, the system was extended north from the previous western terminus at Montebello/19th Avenue along the median of 19th Avenue to a new terminus and park & ride at 19th Avenue/Dunlap in Phoenix. The extension features 3.2 miles (5.1 km) of track, three additional stations, and before opening was predicted to serve 5,000 riders per day in its first full year of operation.

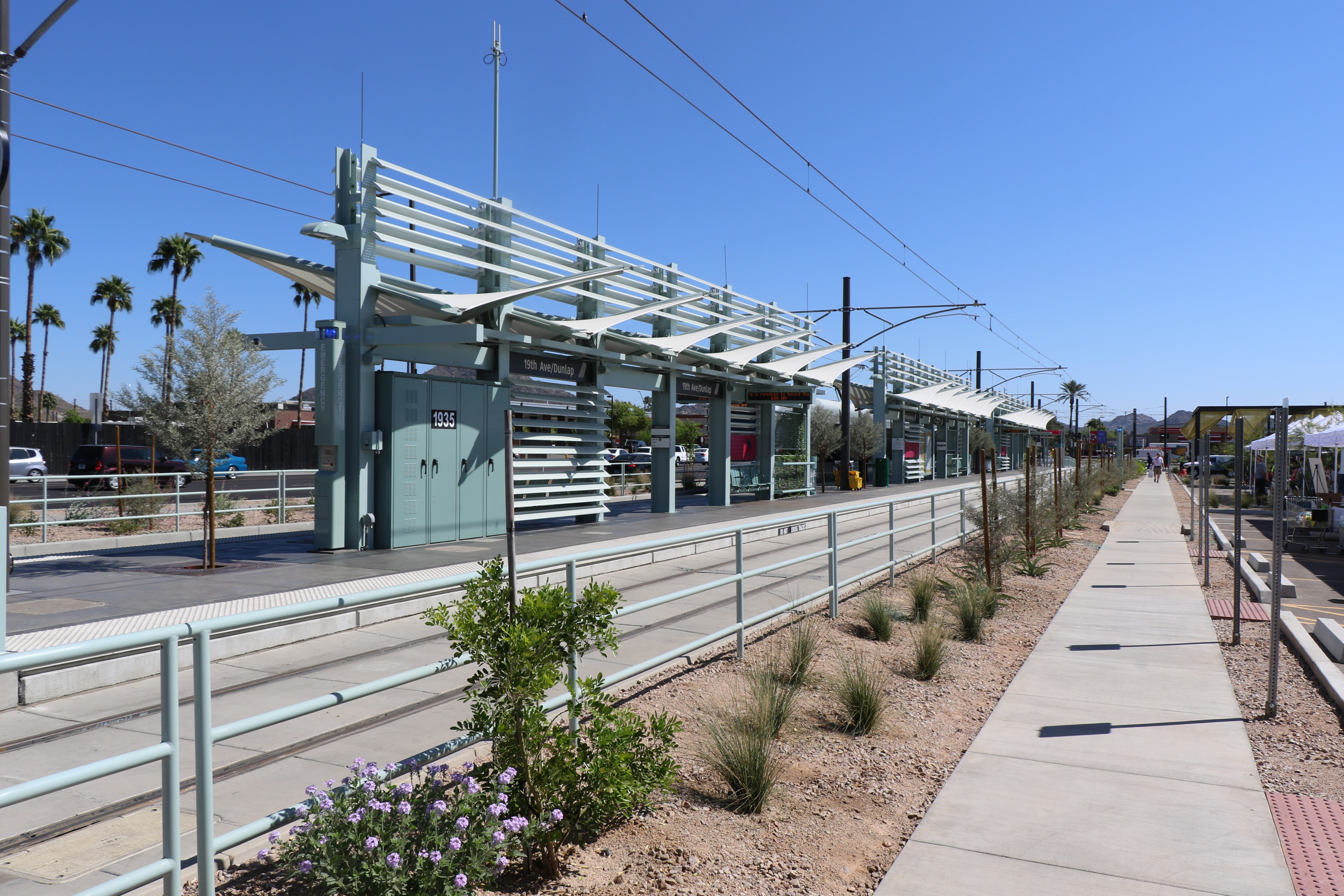
19th Avenue/Dunlap station in March 2016

As an original part of the Transit 2000 plan, this extension was originally scheduled to open by 2012. However, due to lower-than-expected sales tax revenues and uncertainty regarding the availability of federal funds to support the project, the opening date was delayed. Initially, it was pushed back to 2014, and then it was rescheduled again by 9 years, to the fiscal year 2023, by the Phoenix City Council in June 2009. In July 2012, a vote was held to reschedule this extension to open in 2016. Under this plan, the city of Phoenix advanced $60 million (equivalent to $83 million in 2025 dollars) of local funds to Valley Metro Rail, who would then fund the remaining $267 million cost of the project (equivalent to $370 million in 2025 dollars) with both Transit 2000 and Proposition 400 funds, thereby allowing work on the project to begin.

The design-build contract was awarded to a joint venture of Sundt and Stacy Witbeck, for the 3.2-mile (5.1 km) extension. Construction began in January 2013, with a celebration to mark the laying of the first track section being held in July 2014. Construction work continued until December 2015, when it was announced that testing along the new stretch would begin. The extension opened on March 19, 2016.

=== 50th Street infill station ===
The 50th Street infill station project added a new station to the existing alignment at 50th Street and Washington, the first and only infill station added in the Valley Metro Rail & Streetcar system. The project aimed to enable better connectivity with nearby businesses, and recent commercial and residential development projects in the area. The project, funded entirely by the city of Phoenix, began construction in June 2017. Although all Valley Metro stations are ADA accessible, the new station had more accessible features including wider platforms and gentle entrance slopes. The station opened on April 25, 2019.

=== Gilbert Road Extension ===
An extension further eastward, 1.9 miles (3.1 km) past the terminus at Mesa Drive/Main Street to Gilbert Road/Main Street, began construction in October 2016, and began operating on May 18, 2019. The line, budgeted at approximately $184 million (equivalent to $228 million in 2025 dollars), travels in the median of Main Street and has one intermediate stop at Stapley Drive. The design-build contract for this project was awarded to Sundt/Stacy and Witbeck, with Jacobs Engineering providing design services for the project. Service to the new stations started on May 18, 2019.

=== Streetcar ===
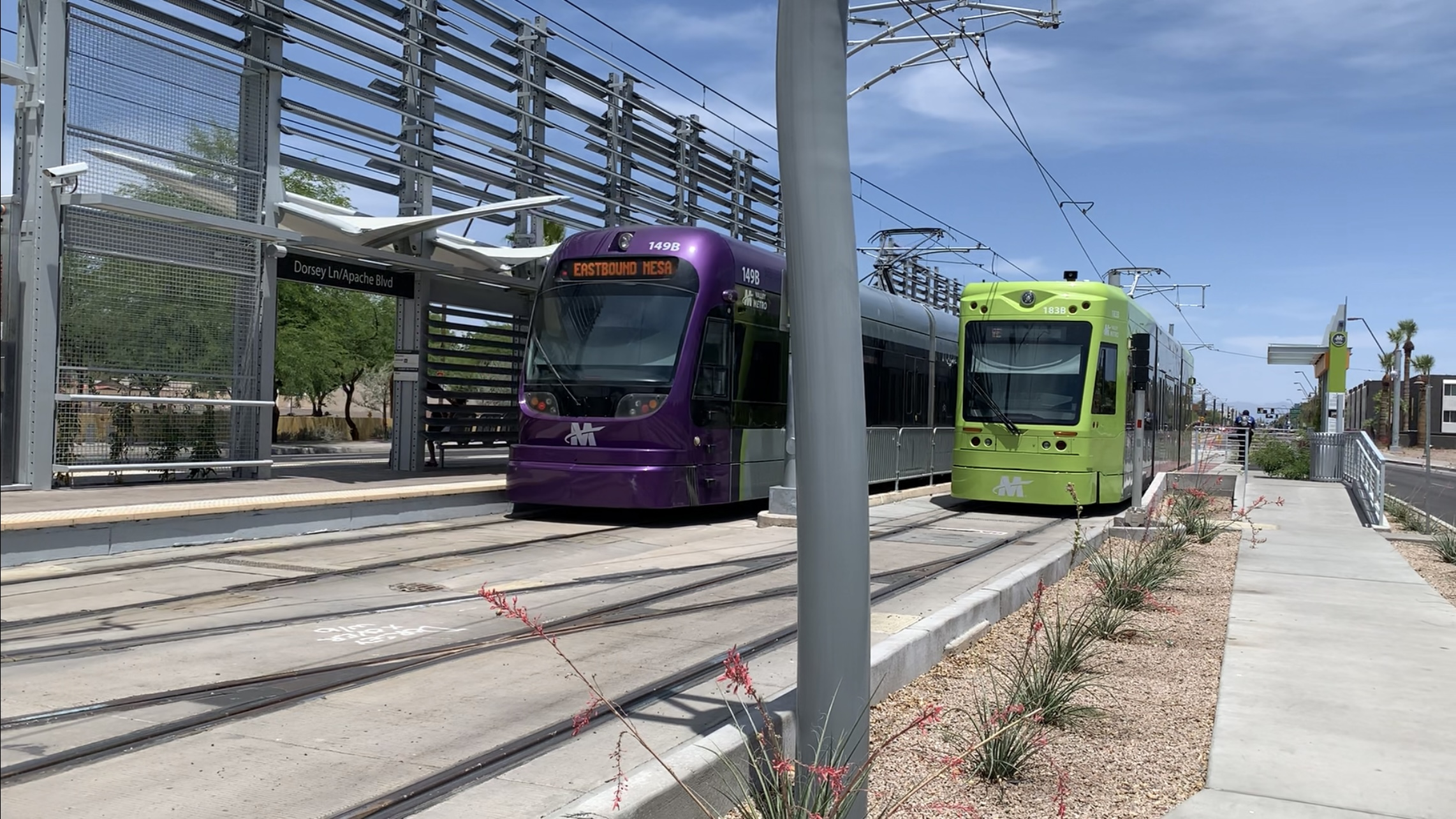
The A and S lines intersect at Dorsey/Apache Blvd station.

The S Line consists of 14 stations, running from Dorsey Lane west on Apache Boulevard, then north on Mill Avenue. From there, it loops around Downtown Tempe along Mill and Ash avenues. The route continues along Rio Salado Parkway to Marina Heights, with a possible extension to Mesa to connect with the Chicago Cubs' new spring training facility, as well as Tempe Marketplace. Service began on May 20, 2022.

=== Northwest Extension Phase II ===
Upon completion of Northwest Phase I, the focus shifted to Phase II of the project. This extension continues west on Dunlap Avenue before turning to head north along 25th Avenue. From there, the system heads west on Mountain View Road, before crossing Interstate 17 and terminating on the east side of the Metrocenter shopping mall. The extension includes three new stations, one in the vicinity of 25th Avenue and Dunlap, another adjacent to the Rose Mofford Sports Complex, and a relocated transit center (Thelda Williams Transit Center) on the east side of Metrocenter Mall.

The extension was originally planned to open in 2026, but it was accelerated to 2024 after the Phoenix City Council passed the Proposition 104 sales tax increase in 2015. In October 2017, the project entered the environmental assessment (EA) phase. The construction contract was awarded to Kiewit-McCarthy in July 2020 and was scheduled to break ground that fall. Service began on January 27, 2024.

Metro Parkway station in June 2024

=== South Central Extension ===
Like the Northwest Extension, the funding from Proposition 104 moved up the timeline of the light rail extension to South Phoenix, this time by a decade. This extension runs from Downtown Phoenix, south along Central Avenue to Baseline Road, adding 5.5 miles (8.9 km) and eight stations, while connecting with two park and ride locations. Additionally, it formed a light rail hub in Downtown Phoenix, between Central and First avenues to the west and east, and Washington and Jefferson streets to the north and south. Also included are new tracks for turn-around/staging purposes at both Third Avenue and Fifth Street for enhanced flexibility during peak service. Because of the new branch created, trains along this segment were planned to operate as a new line, originating at Baseline Road and running to the Downtown Hub before taking over parts of the existing light rail system and continuing north to the terminus at Metro Parkway.

However, outreach to the residents and business owners of South Phoenix became strained when the extension called for the reduction of lanes in each direction from four to two along Central Avenue. In February 2019, opponents were able to gather enough signatures to require the city to hold a referendum on future light rail expansion. The referendum to stop light rail expansion, known as Proposition 105, failed to pass in a special election on August 27, 2019.

Construction on the South Central extension began in October 2019, and service began on June 7, 2025. It introduced a new two-line system with the A Line and the B Line. The A Line runs from the Downtown Phoenix Hub to Gilbert Road/Main Street, while the B Line runs from Metro Parkway to Baseline/Central Avenue.

== Operations ==
=== Route description ===
As of June 2025, the Valley Metro Rail & Streetcar system consists of two lines serving 50 stations on 38.5 miles of tracks within the cities of Phoenix, Tempe, and Mesa. The A Line starts at the Downtown Phoenix Hub. Eastbound service runs on First Avenue south before turning east on Jefferson Street; likewise, westbound one-way service starts at 26th Street on Washington Street before turning north on Central Avenue.

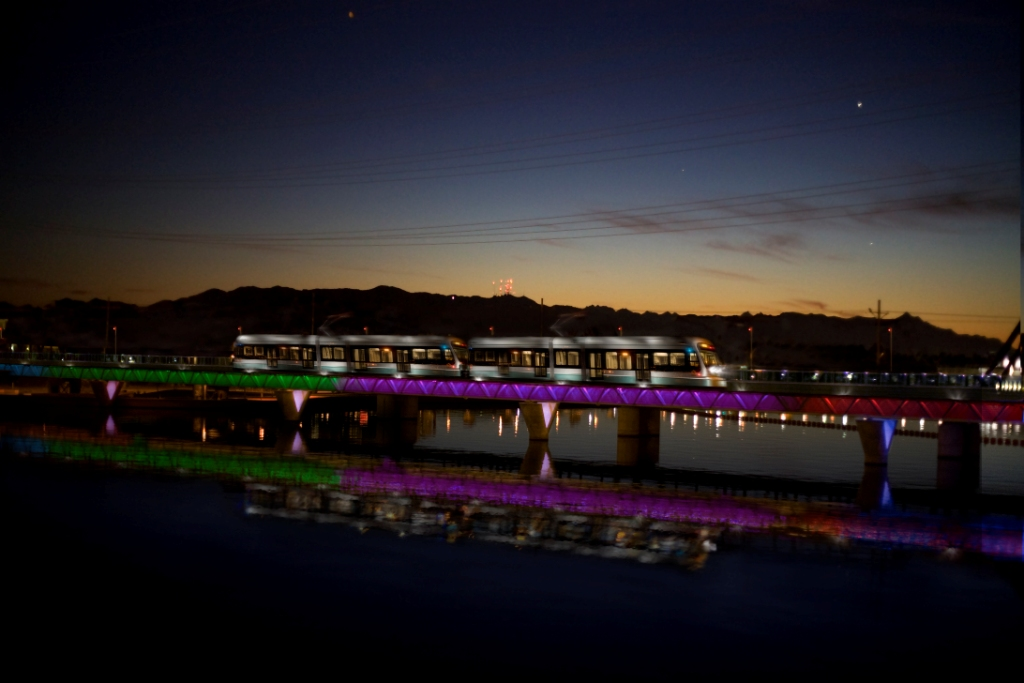
Valley Metro Rail train at night on Tempe Town Lake, 2008

Both tracks rejoin east of 24th Street on Washington Street. Continuing east on Washington, the rail line passes Phoenix Sky Harbor Airport, which is connected by the PHX Sky Train at 44th Street/Washington, and then turns southeast towards Tempe. After Center Parkway/Washington station, the line leaves the median of Washington Street and runs south on a bridge that crosses Tempe Town Lake, parallel to the Union Pacific Railroad. It then turns east along Mill Avenue and connects to the S Line at Mill Avenue/3rd St before proceeding via its own right-of-way near Arizona State University. Going southward, it joins Apache Boulevard headed eastward, which becomes Main Street in Mesa. The light rail line ends at an intersection with Gilbert Road at Gilbert Road/Main Street station.

The B Line starts in Phoenix on the east side of the former Metrocenter shopping mall at the Metro Parkway station. The rail line runs east on an elevated viaduct, crossing over Interstate 17. After the crossing, the line's alignment parallels Mountain View Road before turning south on 25th Street. The line runs south on 25th Street, crossing the Arizona Canal and passing by the Rose Mofford Sports Complex. It continues until it reaches Dunlap Avenue where it swerves east on Dunlap, before turning south again on 19th Avenue for 4 miles (6.4 km). After three stops, it turns eastward again on Camelback Road for 2.5 miles (4.0 km), then turns south onto Central Avenue where it continues into Downtown Phoenix. At Roosevelt Street, the line splits into one-way segments until Lincoln Street. Both track rejoins at Hadley Street. The rail line continues south under the Interstate 17 then Salt River bridge. The light rail line ends at an intersection with Baseline Road at Baseline/Central Avenue station station.

With the opening of the South Central Extension on June 7, 2025, the system has split into two lines: the A Line and B Line. The A Line runs east to west, from the eastern terminus at Gilbert Road/Main Street to the Downtown Phoenix Hub in Downtown Phoenix (which serve as the transfer point between the two lines), while the B Line runs north to south from the Metro Parkway station to Baseline/Central Avenue station.

Trains mostly operate on city streets in a "center reservation" or exclusive lane, similar to the Red Line of the METRORail light rail system in Houston and the surface sections of the MBTA subway's Green Line in Boston. Some parts of the line, such as the bridge over Tempe Town Lake, are independent of other traffic. The Gilbert Road extension included construction of the first roundabout crossed by light rail tracks in the system, at Horne Road; traffic within the roundabout yields to train traffic and is controlled by crossing arms.

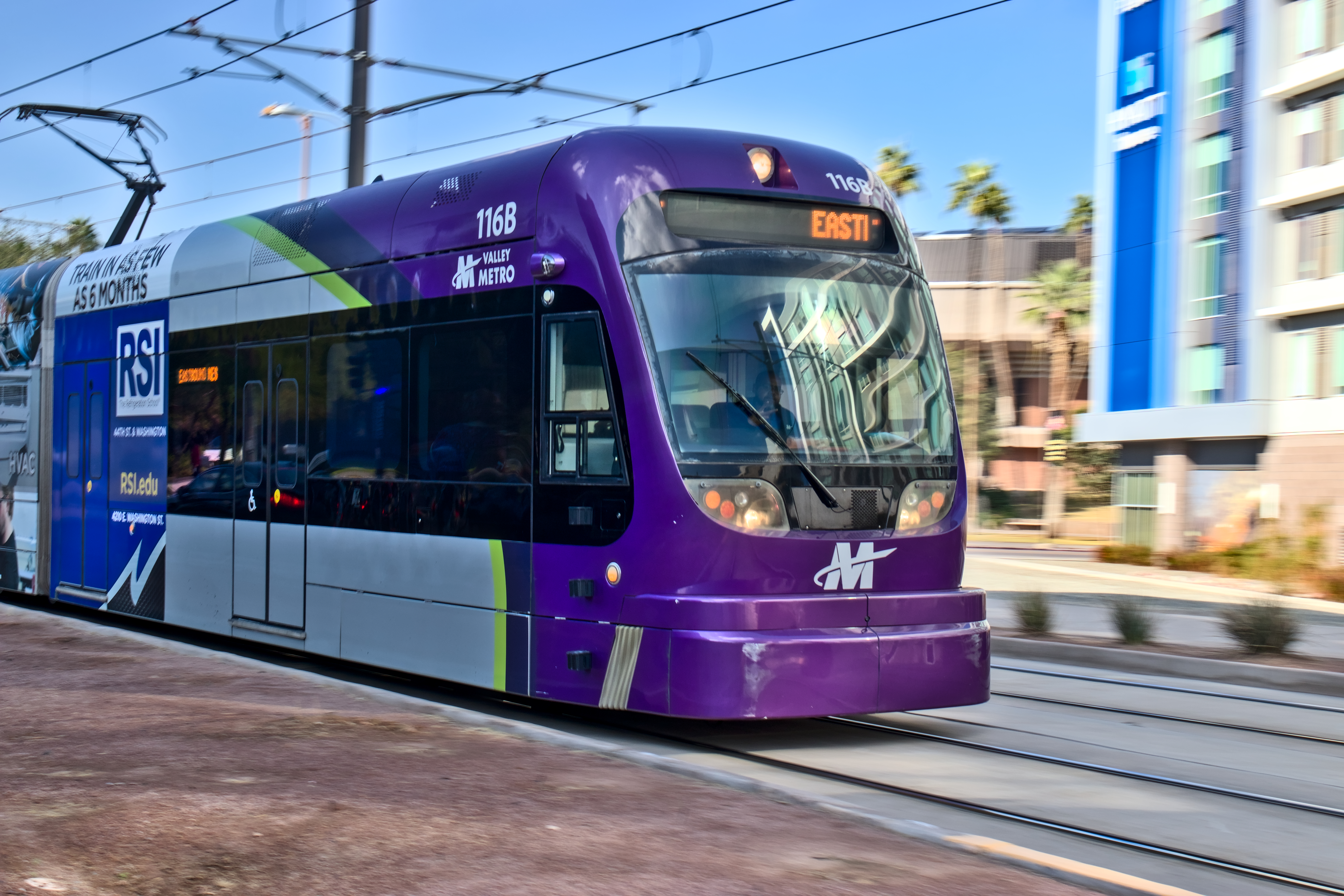
Valley Metro Rail #116 at Veterans Way and 6th St. in Tempe

=== Hours and frequency ===
Full rail service (serving all stops between Metro Parkway and Gilbert Road/Main Street) begins Monday through Friday at approximately 4:30 a.m., while Saturday and Sunday service begins at approximately 4:50 a.m. Full rail service ends at approximately 11 p.m. daily. Since a complete light rail trip takes about 110 minutes from end to end, full rail service does not run earlier or later than those times. Instead, in the early morning and late night hours, limited rail service operates service from Priest Drive/Washington to Gilbert Road/Main Street and from 50th Street/Washington to Metro Parkway. This limited service extends the line's operating hours to as early as 3:30 a.m. and as late as 1 a.m.

Throughout the day, trains run every 12 minutes on weekdays and Saturdays, and every 20 minutes on Sundays. All trains run every 20 minutes from 8 p.m. until the end of service.

=== Rolling stock ===
The initial Valley Metro Rail fleet comprised 50 Kinki Sharyo Low Floor Light Rail Vehicles (LRVs), which were delivered from 2006 to 2008. Each vehicle is 92 feet (28 m) long with operator cabs on both ends and can be coupled into sets of three cars, but typically use two in service. The vehicles have 66 seats and can accommodate 175 passengers at normal loads and a maximum of 226 at crush load. The first Kinki Sharyo vehicles were completed in 2006 and shipped from Osaka to the Phoenix area to undergo testing; the majority of the fleet was assembled in Arizona to comply with Buy America requirements. Due to the desert climate of the Phoenix area the units were designed with more insulation and solar reflective windows as well as larger air conditioner units that are set to a temperature of 74 to 78 °F (23 to 26 °C). The vehicles are accessible with space for four wheelchairs and four bicycles, per vehicle with addition to a hydraulic leveling system to remove potential vertical gap, to ease loading. The vehicles have a maximum speed of 58 mph (93 km/h). The LRVs are also equipped with energy absorbent bumpers to reduce the effects of road vehicle collision, measures warranted due to the light rail mostly running in the center of streets.

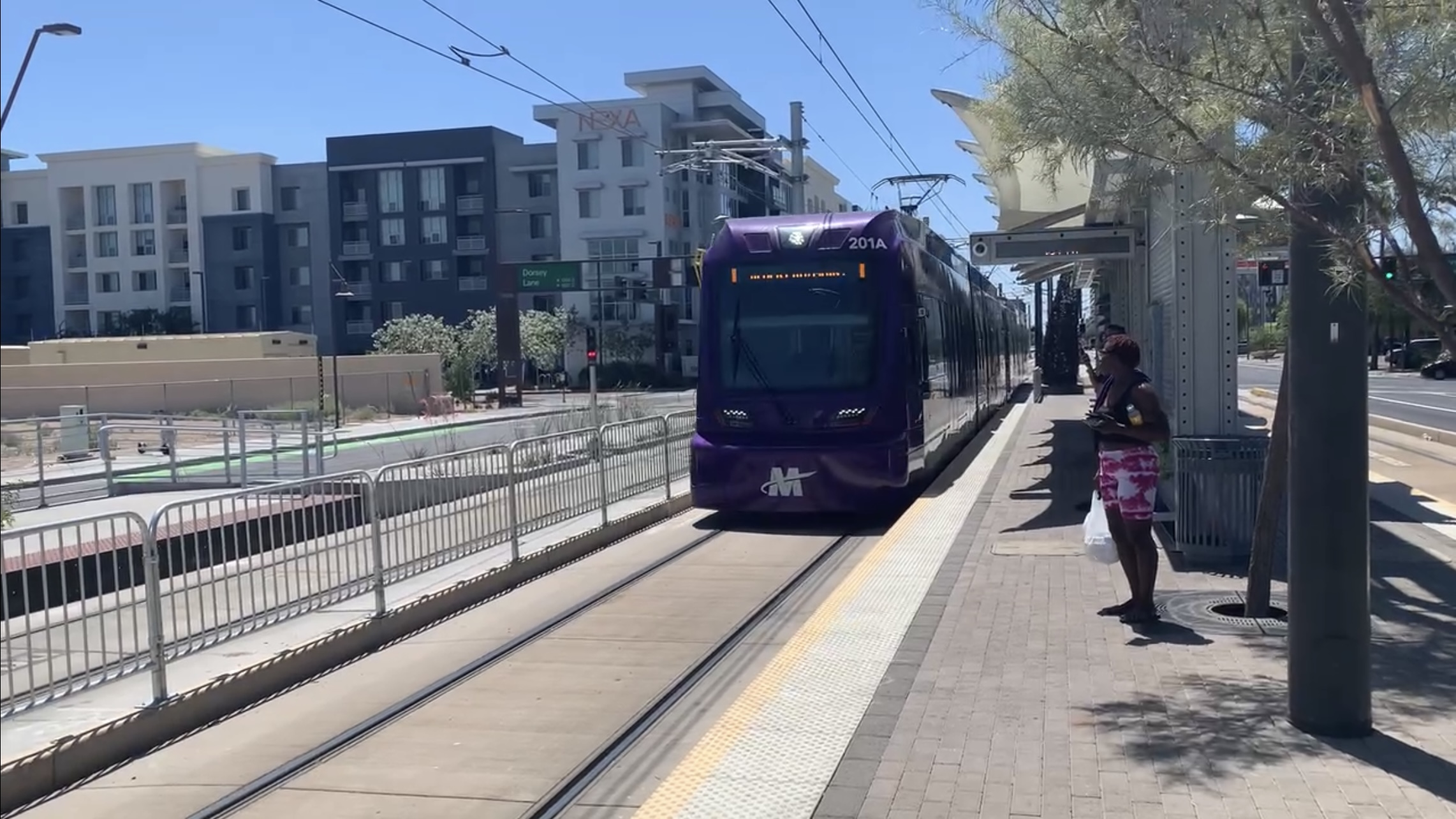
LRV S700 201 arriving at Dorsey Ln/Apache Blvd towards Mesa

In 2017, Valley Metro contracted Brookville Equipment Corporation and Siemens Mobility for six and eleven light rail vehicles, respectively, with the Brookville fleet planned to be used for the S Line. The first Siemens S700 car was delivered in March 2020 and entered service in January 2022; the order was later expanded to 25 cars to support additional light rail projects. The first Brookville car for Tempe was delivered in March 2021. The entire fleet is powered by overhead catenaries energized at 750 volts direct current for traction power. The Brookville streetcars also have an on-board lithium-ion battery that allows for vehicles to operate without wires for one mile (1.6 km) in downtown Tempe.

Manufacturer	Model	Quantity	Fleet numbers	Years in service
Kinki Sharyo	Low Floor Light Rail Vehicle	50	101–150	2008–present
Brookville	Liberty Streetcar	6	180–185	2022–present
Siemens	S700 (Note: The first 11 of these were model S70 at the time the order was placed, but in 2020 they were retroactively rebranded as model S700 by Siemens.)	25 (53 options)	201–225	2022–present

== Fares ==
Valley Metro Rail & Streetcar shares its fare system with the Valley Metro Bus system but uses a proof-of-payment system to allow for simplified boarding and platform access. Fares on Valley Metro Rail & Streetcar contribute to fare capping. A reloadable Copper Card can be purchased from ticket vending machines at the entrance to all stations, or purchased in the Valley Metro App, but must be validated or scanned before boarding the train. Copper Cards can also be purchased at select retailers.

Fare inspections are conducted throughout the system at random to ensure compliance. As of 2015, the system has a fare-compliance rate of 94%.

== Future extensions and improvements ==
=== Priority projects ===
These Valley Metro Rail & Streetcar projects have been given high priority by Valley Metro.

Concept name	Description	Construction	Operational	Status	Ref.
Rio East–Dobson Streetcar Extension	Extends the S Line from the Marina Heights/Rio Solado Parkway station to Dobson Road and Main Street in Mesa, passing by Tempe Marketplace and Sloan Park.	TBD	2029	Engineering Design	
West Phoenix Extension	Constructs a new light rail line connecting the B Line in Midtown to Maryvale largely along the median of Indian School Road. The line will run from either the Indian School/Central Avenue station or the 19th Avenue/Camelback station to the future station at the Desert Sky Transit Center.	2032–2036	2037	LPA approved	
ASU West Extension	Extends the B Line from the Metro Parkway station to ASU West.	TBD	2044	No LPA conducted	
Capitol Extension	Extends the A Line from its terminus at the Downtown Phoenix Hub towards 15th Avenue/Jefferson and 15th Avenue/Washington.	TBD	TBD	Suspended	
I-10 West Extension	Extends the A Line from 15th Avenue/Jefferson and 15th Avenue/Washington to the Desert Sky Transit Center.	TBD	TBD	Likely suspended	
Northeast Extension	Constructs a light rail line connecting the B Line in Midtown to the Paradise Valley Transit Center. Development will only start after work in West Phoenix is finished.	TBD	TBD	No LPA conducted	

=== Rio East–Dobson Streetcar Extension ===
Valley Metro is in the engineering design phase of extending the S Line past its terminus at Marina Heights into Mesa, via Rio Salado Parkway and Dobson Road. The proposed extension would serve major destinations in Mesa and eastern Tempe, including Tempe Marketplace and Sloan Park. The extension would be approximately 4 miles (6.4 km) in length.

The Rio East–Dobson Streetcar Extension (REDE) was awarded a $15.9 million federal grant in July 2024. The grant was funded by the Infrastructure Investment and Jobs Act, and will help advance the planning process for the proposed line.

The project is currently scheduled to be completed prior to 2030, per documentation in the federal grant.

=== West Phoenix Extension ===
Map of Valley Metro Rail & Streetcar system, showing starter line and future expansion corridors

Starting in 2013, Valley Metro along with the cities of Glendale and Phoenix approved a project to study the potential extension of light rail, bus rapid transit or streetcar to Glendale. Initially, three different route options were proposed, all heading west from the existing light rail system and featuring a shared terminus in the Downtown Glendale area. Options included travel directly across Glendale Avenue, as well as routes that travel along Camelback Road and a combination of 43rd and 51st avenues, before entering the shared downtown terminus area.

In February 2016, a community working group recommended a route for this project, this route travels along Camelback Road until 43rd Avenue, at which point light rail would travel north along 43rd Avenue until Glendale Avenue, from there it would continue west until it reaches 56th Avenue, where the route is likely to shift approximately 500 feet (150 m) north to Glenn Drive, where it will continue to the downtown terminus. Light rail was selected as the preferred type of transit for the route, as opposed to bus rapid transit or streetcar.

On October 17, 2017, Glendale City Council directed staff against moving forward on a route into downtown Glendale, effectively killing the plans for the Glendale portion of the extension. At the beginning of 2019, Phoenix City Council voted to delay the remaining Phoenix portion of the project indefinitely.

Starting in 2022, Valley Metro opened talks again about the West Phoenix Extension. The West Phoenix Extension will run from 91st Avenue and Thomas Road to 75th Avenue and Thomas then turn north to Indian School Road and connect to the Indian School Road and Central Avenue station. As of 2023 the project is in the locally preferred alternative adoption process. The West Phoenix Extension will also connect with the I-10 West Extension on 79th Avenue and Thomas Road and the Phoenix BRT on 35th Avenue and Indian School Road.

On May 30, 2024, Phoenix City Council approved the project.

In January 2026, the Phoenix City council voted to end the Capitol Extension and prioritize the West Phoenix Extension. The planned route was modified once again, with the route now set to go from the existing station at Indian School/Central to the Desert Sky Transit Center, primarily along Indian School Road, in an attempt to recapture the corridor previously set to be served by the I-10 West Extension. Even with the extension being Valley Metro's new #1 priority, the projected opening is now set at 2037.

=== ASU West Extension ===
As of 2019, an extension was planned to occur to Arizona State University's West campus in 2044.

=== Capitol Extension ===
The Capitol Extension extends the A Line from the Downtown Phoenix Hub in Downtown Phoenix west to 15th Avenue, adding 0.8 miles (1.3 km) and two stations. Environmental assessment work started in 2024. As of 2026, the project is suspended, with Maryvale being served by the West Phoenix Extension instead.

In March 2024, Valley Metro selected Jacobs Engineering for principal civil design and PGH Wong Engineering for principal system design.

In May 2024, the project entered the environmental assessment (EA) phase.

In January 2026, the Phoenix City council voted to end the project just before construction was set to start, citing cost concerns, low projected ridership, and disruption to the state capitol area and government operations, as well as nearby businesses. The West Phoenix Extension was chosen to be prioritized instead. Following this, Valley Metro announced they were suspending work on the project.

=== I-10 West Extension ===
The I-10 West Extension will run from 15th Avenue west to Interstate 17 before turning north to the interchange of Interstate 10 and I-17 ("The Stack"). Then the line will turn west and continue down I-10 in the median past 43rd Avenue. It will then go over the westbound lanes of I-10 to continue alongside the highway to Desert Sky Mall, adding 10 miles (16 km) and 8 stations to connect the West Valley and ease congestion on Interstate 10. The line will transfer over I-10 from the median to the shoulder at 47th Avenue, which will connect with I-10 around 51st Avenue with an elevated station. In the fall of 2021, the Phoenix City Council approved extending the project corridor to the Desert Sky Transit Center, adjacent to the Desert Sky Mall.

In May 2024, the project entered the preliminary engineering (PE) phase.

In January 2026, the Phoenix City council voted to end the Capitol Extension just before construction was set to start, prompting Valley Metro to suspend work on the project. Although the I-10 West Extension was not specifically mentioned, without the Capitol Extension to serve as a connector between I-10 and the rest of the light rail system, it is unlikely that the I-10 West Extension will occur. The West Phoenix Extension was prioritized in the wake of the city council's decision, and it is set to head to and terminate at Maryvale and the Desert Sky Transit Center.

=== Northeast Extension ===
A previous study into a Northeast light rail corridor from what is now the B Line to the Paradise Valley Transit Center was suspended indefinitely in 2018, with Phoenix City Council directing funds towards street maintenance instead.

Following completion of the West Phoenix Extension, North Phoenix will be the last of the seven identified initial expansion corridors to not have any official proposed lines, and one of two corridors to not have light rail service.

=== Other East Valley Extensions ===
Extensions of light rail in the East Valley cities of Tempe, Mesa, Chandler, and Gilbert were also being studied.

Tempe chose to focus on the Tempe Streetcar rather than a unified East Valley Line, with a planned extension into Mesa via the Rio East-Dobson Streetcar Extension. It is unclear if the north-south section of the streetcar is planned to run parallel with any future north-south east valley lines.

Due to community opposition, Gilbert was not included in what is now the Gilbert Road Extension but was still discussed for possible future extensions. In 2023, Gilbert passed a law banning the use of taxpayer funds for nearly all forms of public transit besides busses, precluding any north-south extension of the A Line down Gilbert Road past the Mesa/Gilbert border at Baseline Road. If the law is ever repealed, and community opinion changes, Gilbert would immediately become a top candidate for extensions.

Light rail extends one-third of the way through Mesa, with the A Line running east-west from Mesa's western border at Price Road to the line's eastern terminus at Gilbert Road. The Tempe Streetcar Rio East-Dobson Streetcar Extension is set to provide an additional line entering the city. Additionally, the cities of Mesa and Chandler have chosen to explore a possible new north-south line through the two cities. The Mesa Portion of the line (Fiesta District Study, 2020) line would run from Main/Dobson (tying into the Tempe Streetcar Extension) 2.5 miles to Southern/Country Club; the Chandler Portion of the line (Arizona Avenue Study, 2021) would see the line continue south along Country Club one mile to Baseline. A possible Phase II extension would run down Country Club (named Arizona Avenue within Chandler) an additional seven miles, passing through downtown Chandler and ending at Germann Road.

== See also ==
- PHX Sky Train
- Transportation in Phoenix, Arizona
- Light rail in North America
- List of tram and light rail transit systems
- List of rail transit systems in the United States
