= Veterans Way/College Avenue station =

Valley Metro Rail center in Tempe, Arizona

Veterans Way/College Ave
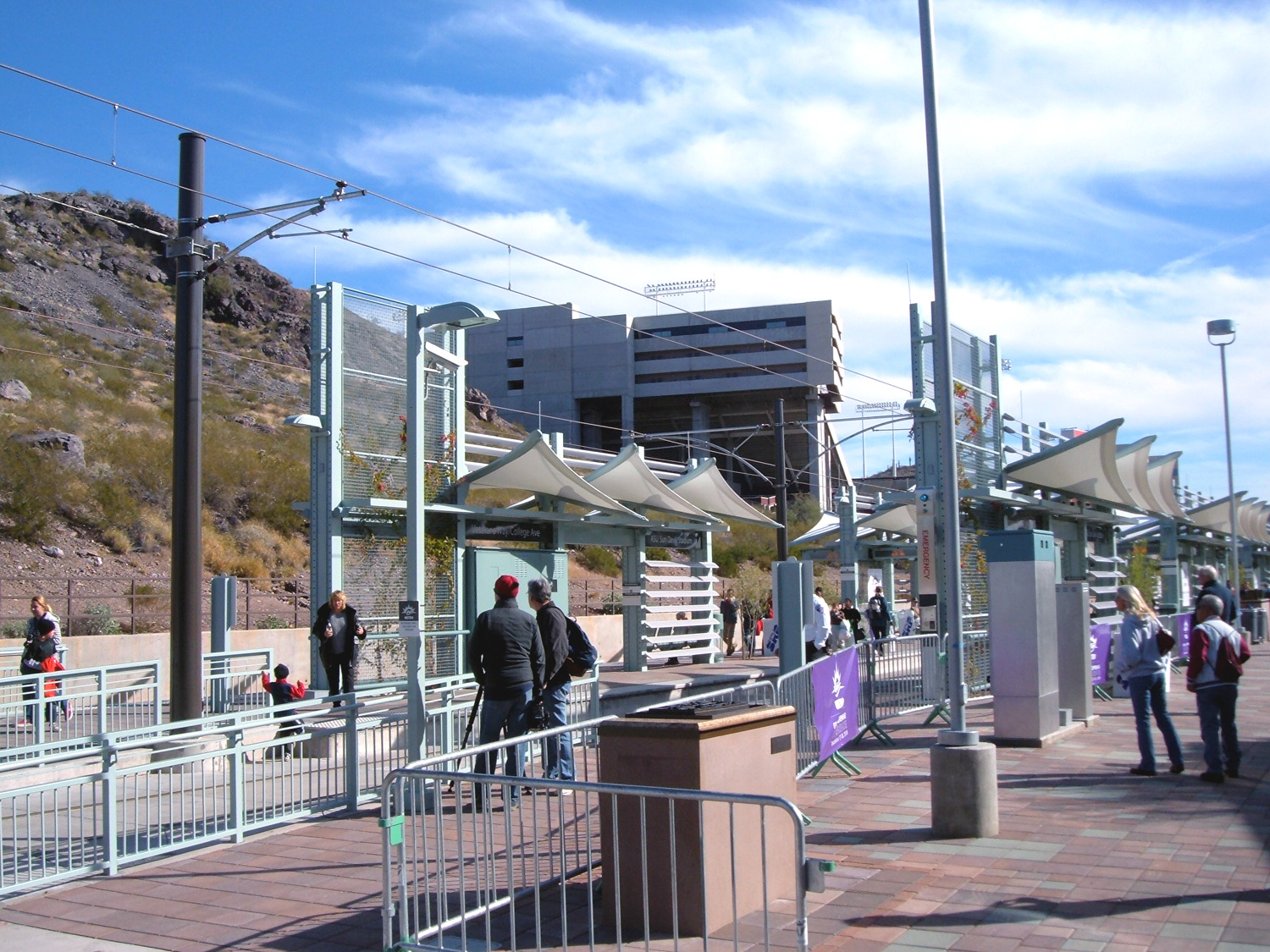
- The station during its first day of service on December 27, 2008

General information
- Other names: Tempe Transportation Center; Mountain America Stadium
- Location: Fifth Street and College Avenue, Tempe, Arizona; United States
- Owner: Valley Metro
- Operator: Valley Metro Rail & Streetcar
- Platforms: 1 island platform, 1 side platform
- Tracks: 2
- Connections: Valley Metro Bus: 48, 62, 65, 66, 72, Tempe Orbit Earth, Tempe Orbit Jupiter, Tempe Orbit Mars, Tempe Orbit Mercury, Tempe Orbit Venus, Tempe Flash

Construction
- Structure type: At-grade
- Cycle facilities: Yes
- Accessible: Yes

Other information
- Station code: 10022

History
- Opened: December 27, 2008

Services
Preceding station	Valley Metro	Following station
Mill Avenue/3rd Street toward Downtown Phoenix Hub	A Line	University Drive/Rural toward Gilbert Road/Main Street
Location

Veterans Way/College Avenue station, also known as the Tempe Transportation Center, is a regional transportation center on the A Line of the Valley Metro Rail & Streetcar system in Tempe, Arizona, United States. As part of the regional transportation system, it is also the location of stops on multiple bus routes. A bike station is located here. The train station consists of one side platform serving eastbound trains and one island platform capable of serving trains in either direction.

This station has three names: Valley Metro calls the train platforms of this station Veterans Way/College Ave and the local bus bays the Tempe Transportation Center. Both are part of the same facility and immediately adjacent to Mountain America Stadium which serves as the station's third name, as shown on the train platform signs. Bus schedules, train maps, and local signage all refer variously to only one of the names.

== Tempe Transportation Center ==
Tempe Transportation Center
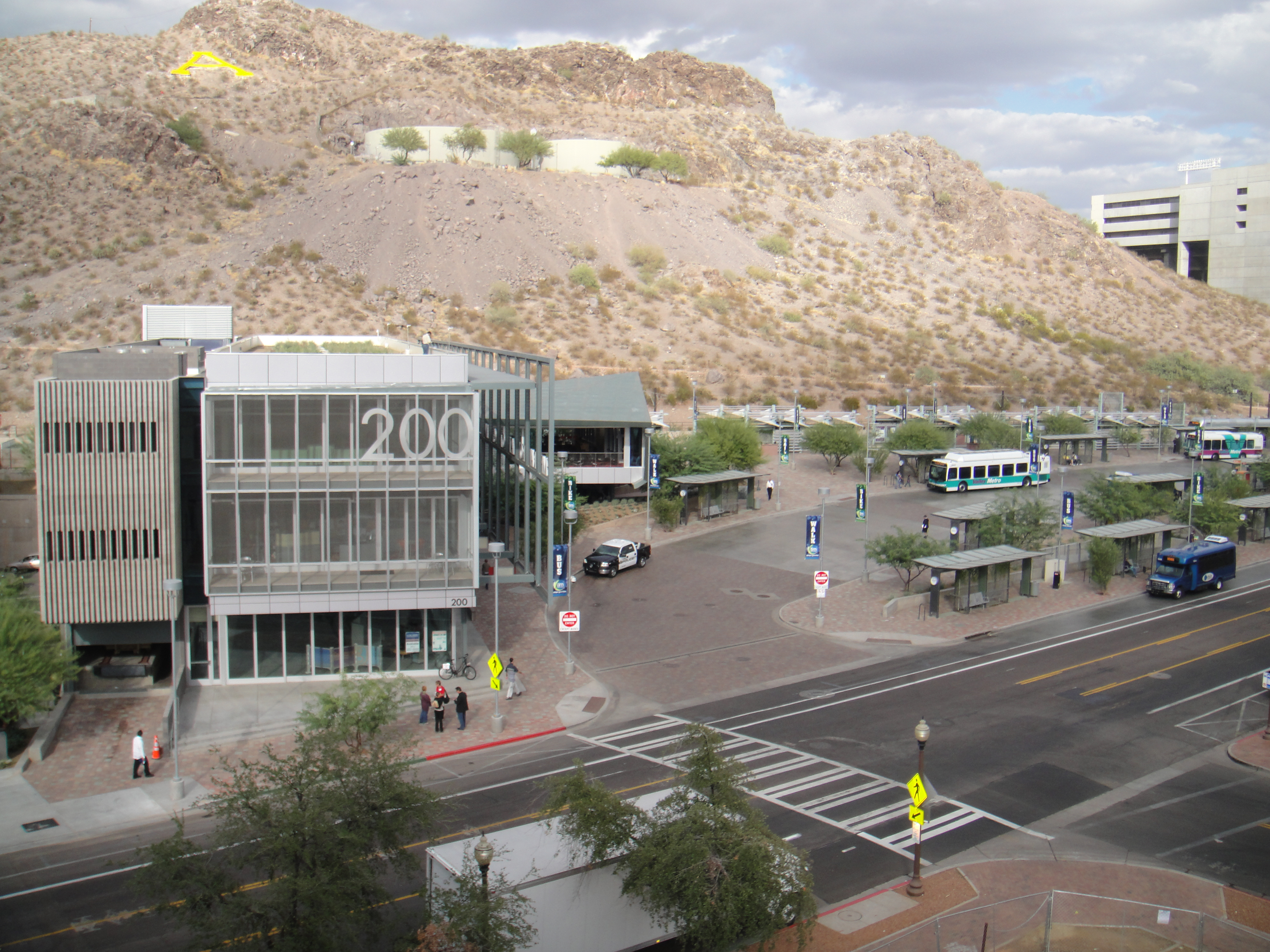
- Overall view of the Tempe Transportation Center from the roof of the city hall parking garage
- Interactive map of the Tempe Transportation Center area

General information
- Type: Transit center
- Location: Veterans Way and College Avenue, 200 East Fifth Street; Tempe, Arizona 85281; United States
- Coordinates: 33°25′33.75″N 111°56′9.25″W
- Cost: $25 million USD
- Owner: City of Tempe

Technical details
- Structural system: Steel frame, concrete floors, glass and masonry curtain walls
- Floor count: 3 story
- Floor area: 40,000 sq ft (3,700 m^{2})

Design and construction
- Architect: John Kane
- Architecture firm: Architekton with OTAK
- Structural engineer: Brickey Design Associates
- Civil engineer: Michael Baker, Jr., Inc
- Other designers: Mechanical/electrical engineer LSW; Landscape architect A Dye Design; LEED consultant Natural Logic Inc.
- Main contractor: Adolfson and Peterson
- Awards: Platinum-level LEED certification pending

The Tempe Transportation Center facilities are a combination of a light rail station, bus transfer stations and a mixed-use building, all in the shadow of A Mountain. The main building is composed of three stories with retail space, a transit information center, and Arizona's first bike station, all on the first floor. The second floor is home to the offices for the City of Tempe Transportation Department Offices and the signature element of the project, the Don Cassano Community Room, which is open on the ground level to provide shading for pedestrians passing by. On the third floor of the building are leasable office space and the City of Tempe's Transit Operations Center.

The center was designed by the Tempe-based firm Architekton with Portland, OR based OTAK Inc. and is currently under review for LEED v2.2 Platinum Certification. The majority of the outdoor area on the site is covered with water-permeable pavers for natural drainage. Solar panels on the green roof are designed to reduce the heat island effect, with local plants to help insulate the building.

== Ridership ==
Weekday rail passengers
Year	In	Out	Average daily in	Average daily out
2009	440,430	455,710	1,734	1,794
2010	477,318	510,669	1,887	2,018
2011	492,715	540,879	1,970	2,163
2012	502,545	562,034	2,010	2,248
2013	489,730	551,426	1,958	2,205
2014	495,092	552,384	1,980	2,209
2015	519,599	571,492	2,078	2,258

== Gallery ==
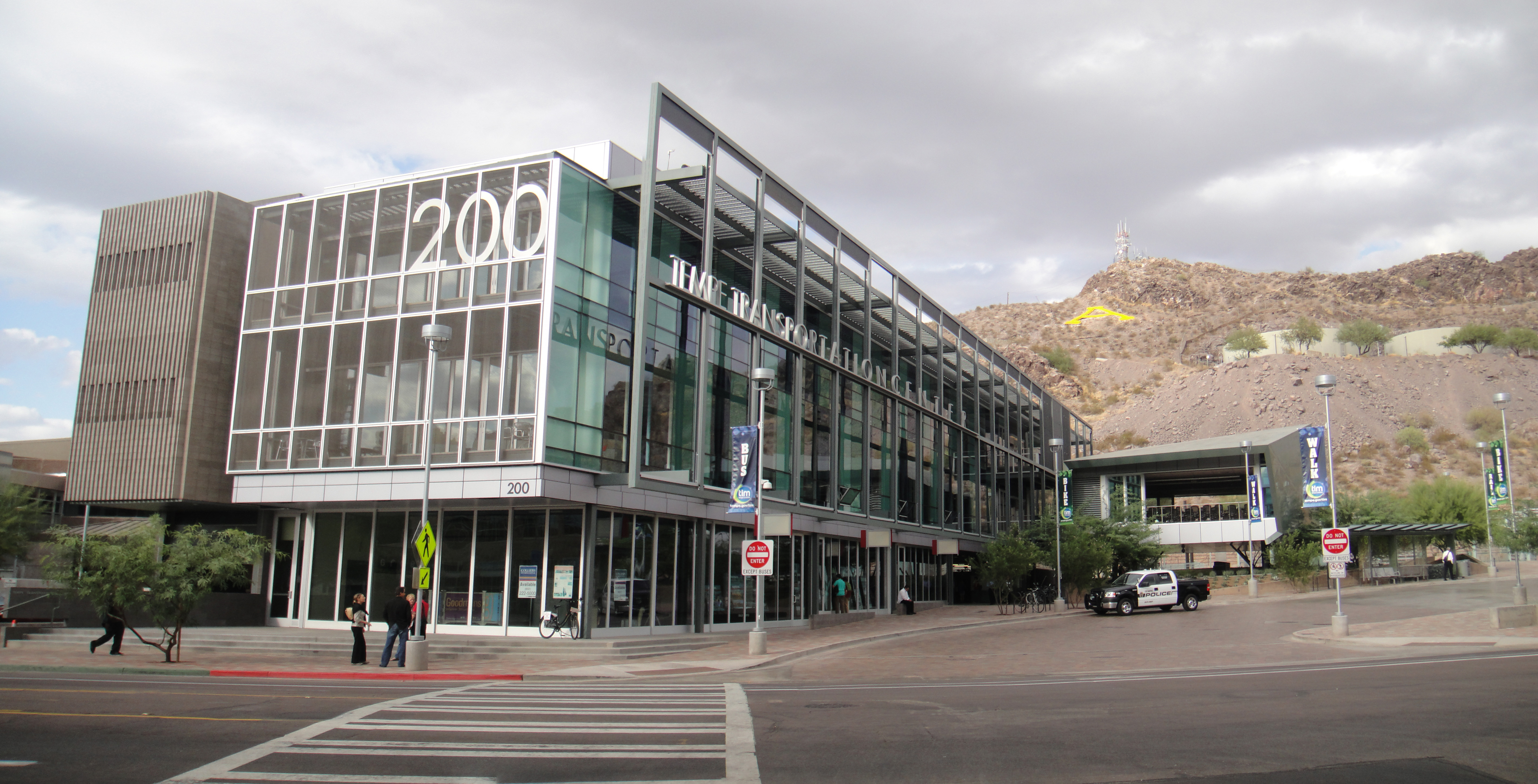
South side of the Tempe Transportation Center building

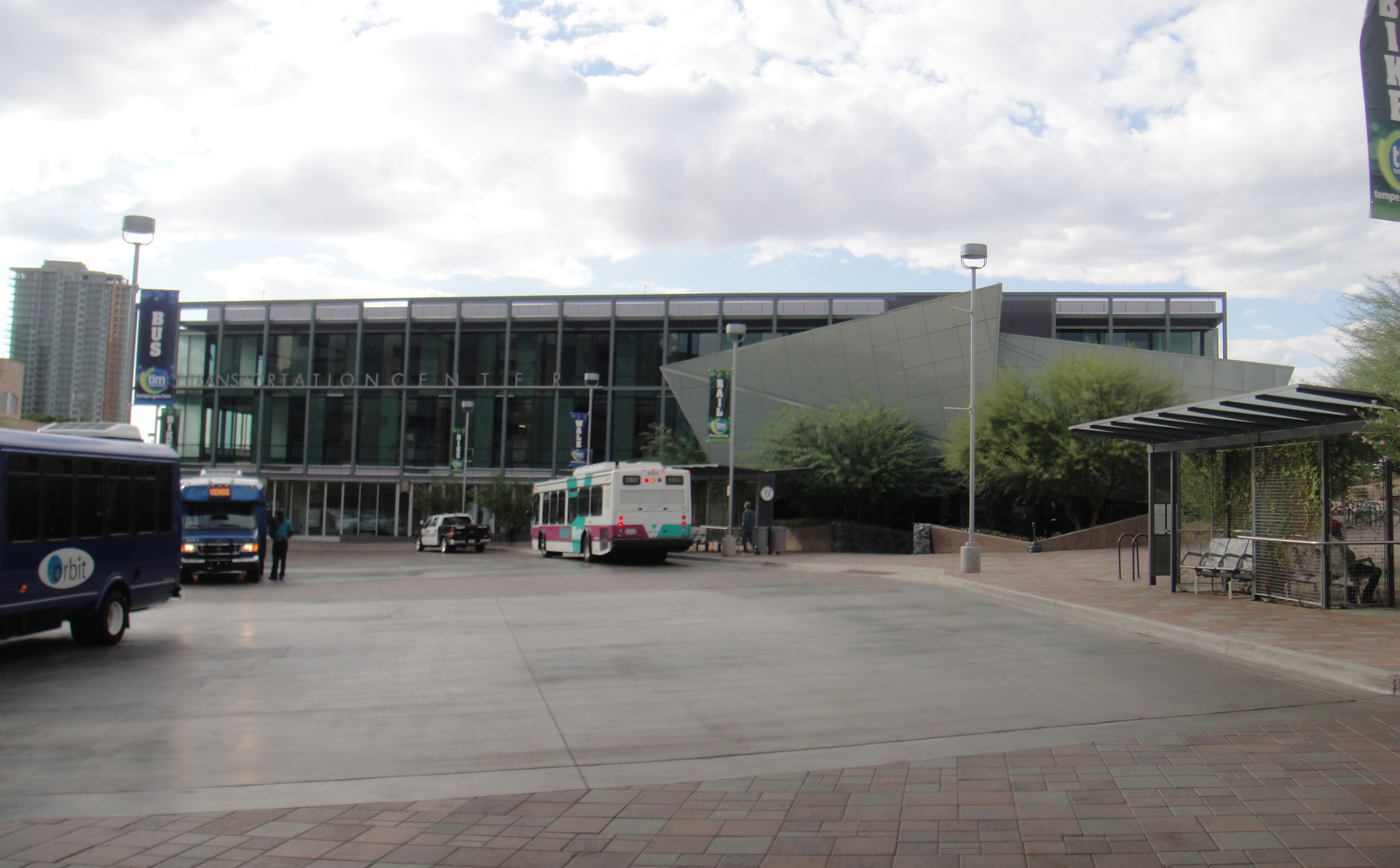
East side of the Tempe Transportation Center building

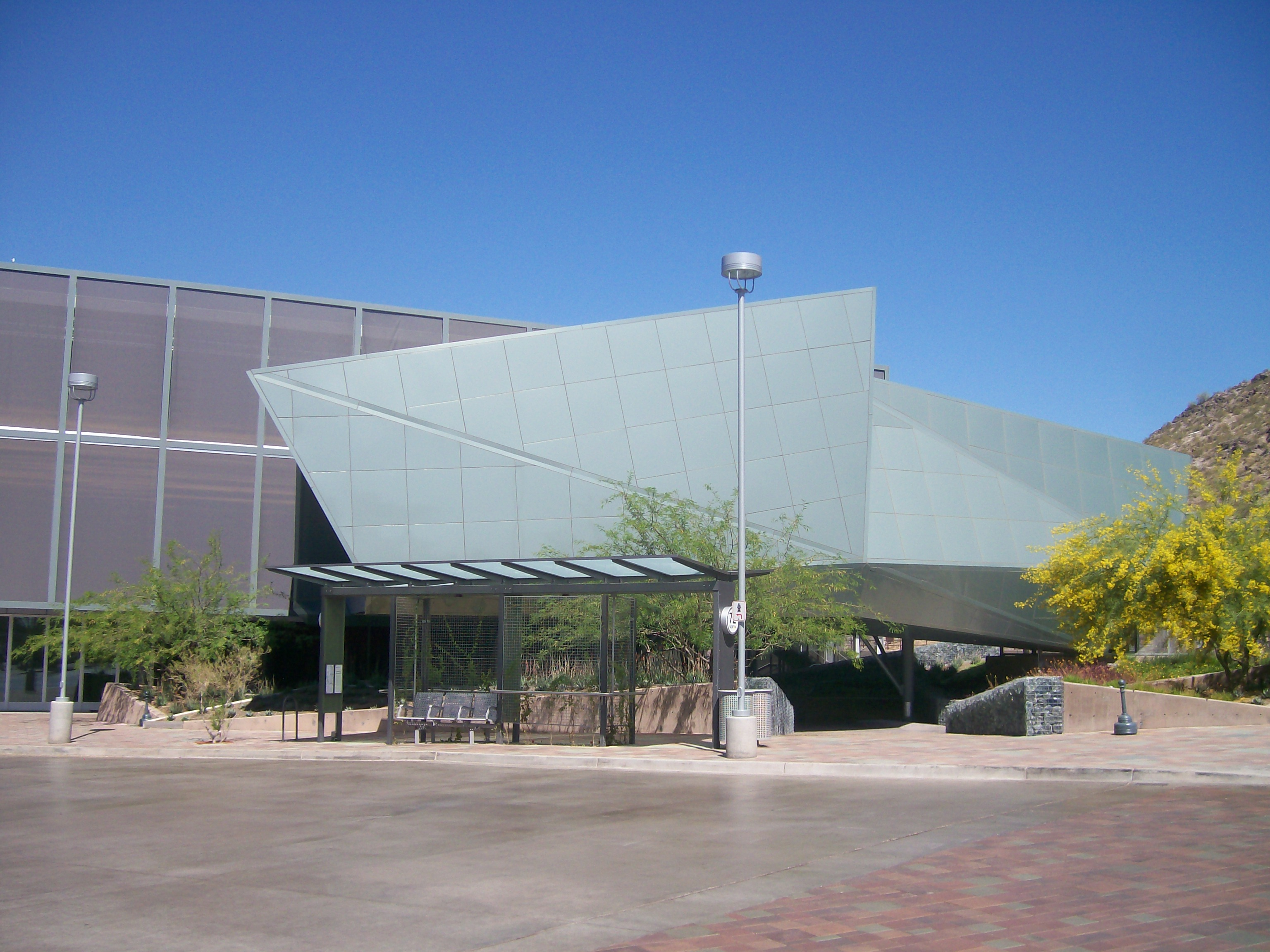
The community center at the Tempe Transportation Center

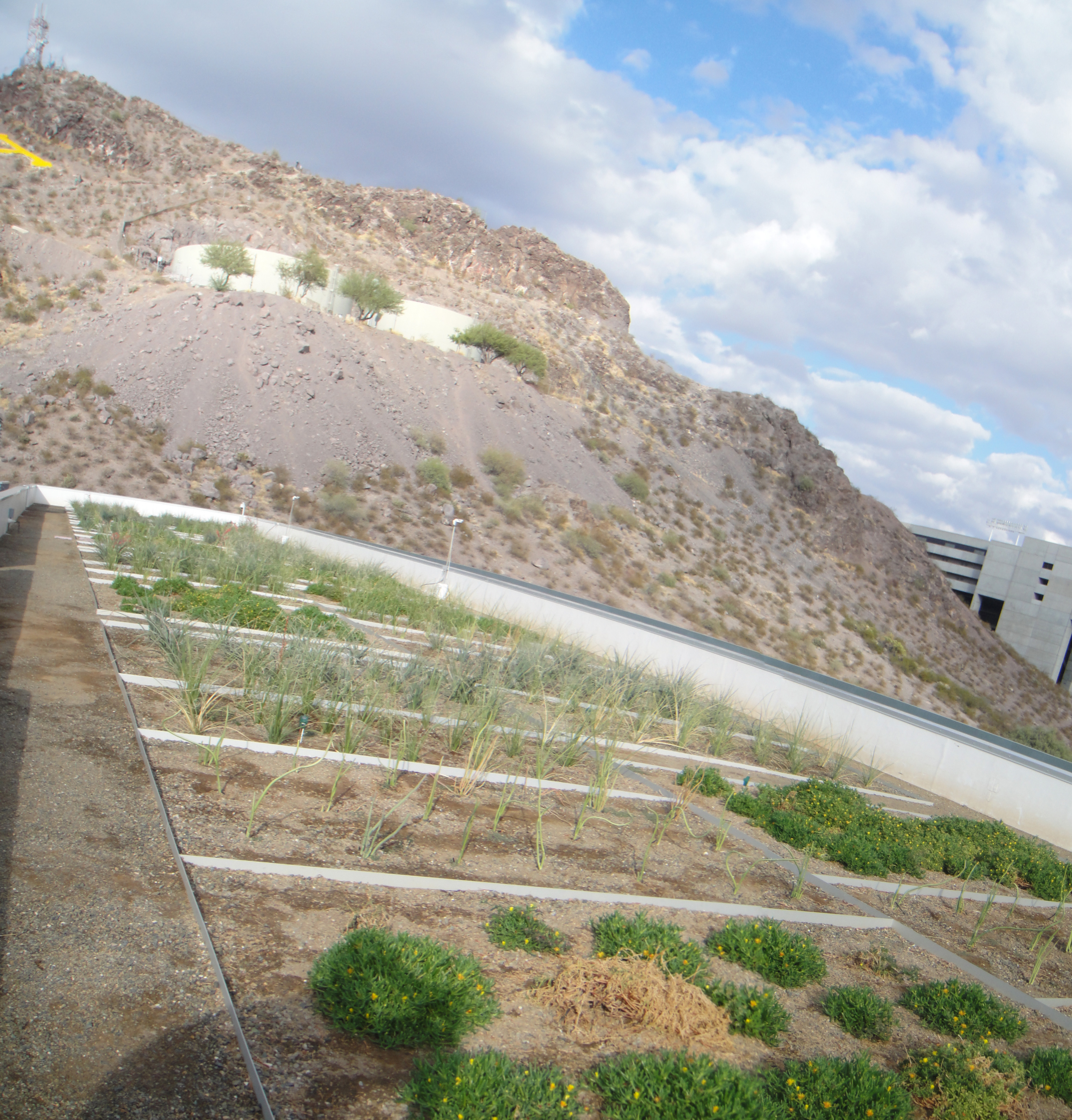
Green roof on top of the Tempe Transportation Center building

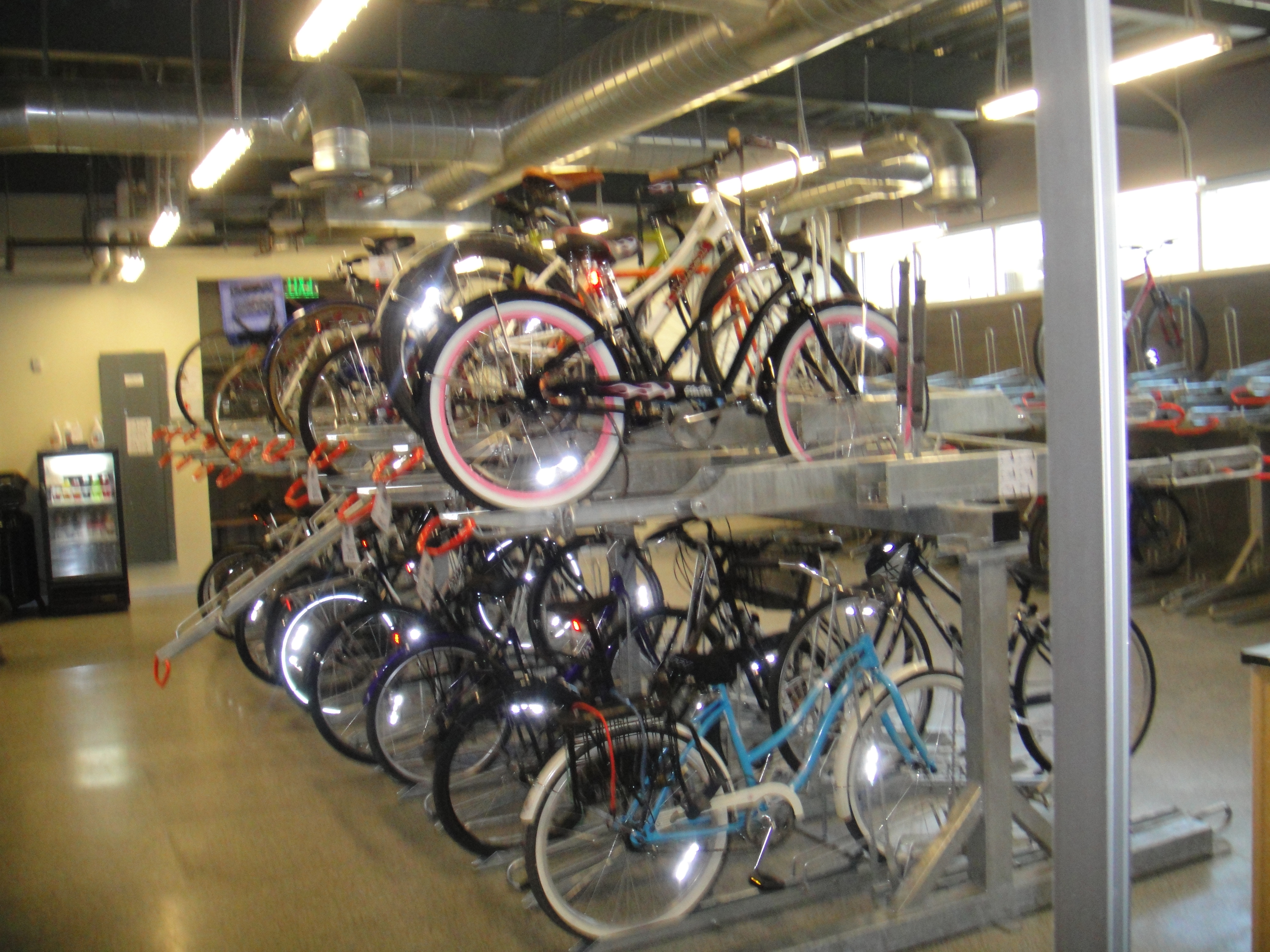
The Bicycle Cellar bike station and bike shop inside the Tempe Transportation Center

== Notable places nearby ==
- Tempe City Hall
- Arizona State University: Tempe Campus
- Mountain America Stadium
- Desert Financial Arena
- Gammage Memorial Auditorium (approx. 1/2 mile (0.80 km))
- Tempe Butte / A Mountain
- Mill Avenue / Downtown Tempe

== Connections ==
Valley Metro Bus	Route number	Route name	North/east end		South/west end		
Valley Metro Bus	48	48th Street	Mesa Riverview		Baseline Road/Priest Drive		
Valley Metro Bus	62	Hardy Drive	Tempe Marketplace	Terminus (select weekday trips)	Guadalupe/Kyrene Road (select weekday trips)		IKEA Tempe
Valley Metro Bus	66	Mill Avenue/Kyrene Road	Terminus		Lone Butte Casino	Kyrene Road/Warner Road (select trips)	Kyrene Road/Elliot Road (select weekday trips)
Valley Metro Bus	EART	Tempe Orbit Earth	Tempe Marketplace		Terminus		
Valley Metro Bus	JUPI	Tempe Orbit Jupiter	Terminus		McClintock High School		
Valley Metro Bus	MARS	Tempe Orbit Mars	Terminus		Dorsey Lane/Broadway Road (select weekday trips)		Southern Avenue/Evergreen Road
Valley Metro Bus	MERC	Tempe Orbit Mercury	Terminus		McClintock Drive/8th Street (select weekday trips)		Escalante Center
Valley Metro Bus	VENU	Tempe Orbit Venus	Tempe Transportation Center (Note: Operates as a continuous loop in both clockwise and counterclockwise directions)		Hardy Drive/Broadway Road		

== See also ==
- List of United States bike stations
