= Center/Main Street station =

Light rail station in Mesa, Arizona

Center/Main St
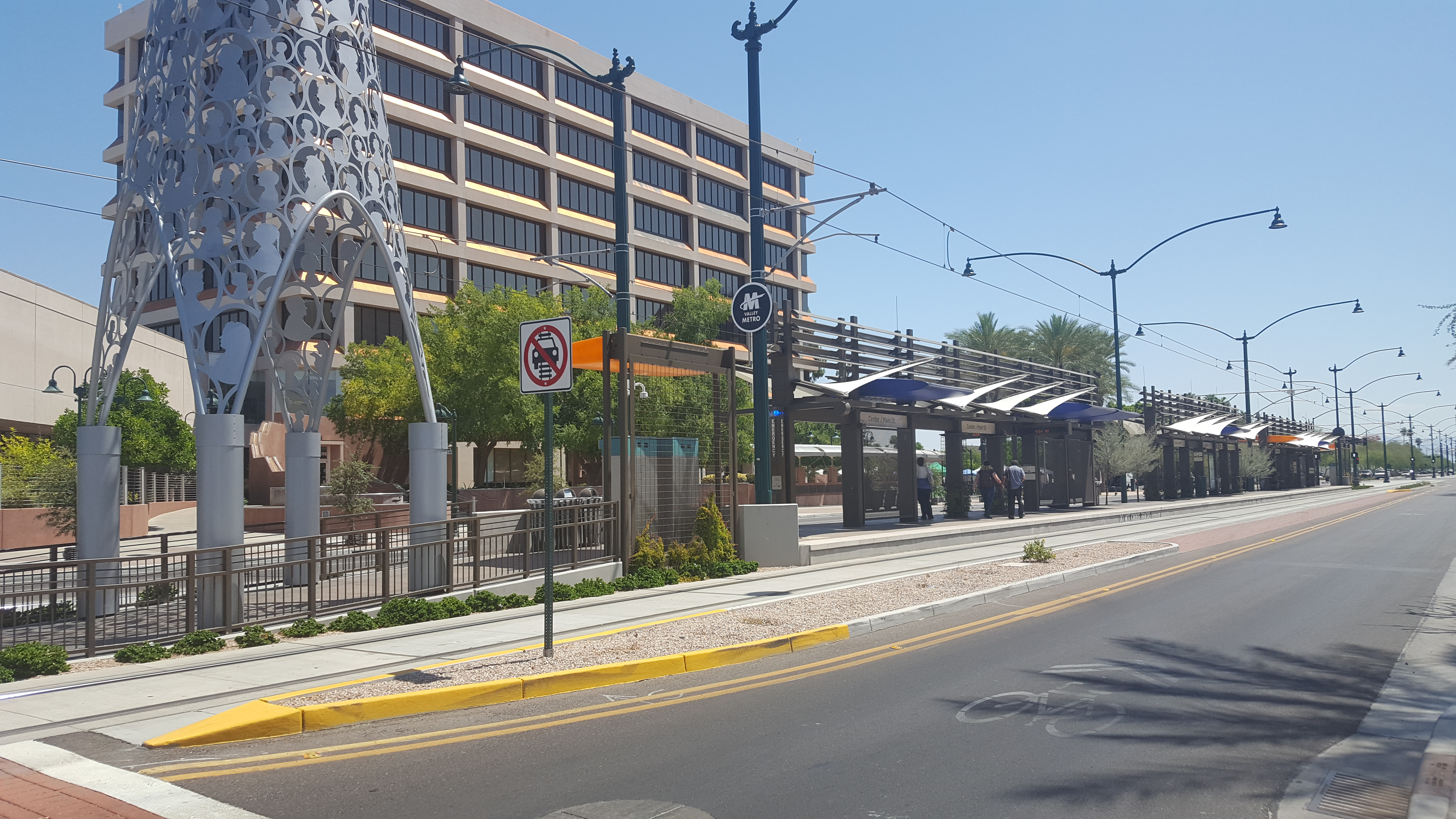

General information
- Other names: City Center
- Location: Main Street and Center Street, Mesa, Arizona; United States
- Coordinates: 33°24′54″N 111°49′50″W
- Owner: Valley Metro
- Operator: Valley Metro Rail & Streetcar
- Platforms: 1 island platform
- Tracks: 2
- Connections: Valley Metro Bus: 40, 112, Downtown BUZZ

Construction
- Structure type: At-grade
- Accessible: Yes

Other information
- Station code: 18602

History
- Opened: August 22, 2015

Services
Preceding station	Valley Metro	Following station
Country Club/Main Street toward Downtown Phoenix Hub	A Line	Mesa Drive/Main Street toward Gilbert Road/Main Street
Location

Center/Main Street station, also known as City Center, is a station on the A Line of the Valley Metro Rail & Streetcar system in Mesa, Arizona, United States. The station is located one block east of the intersection of East Main Street and North Center Street and opened on August 22, 2015 as part of the Central Mesa Extension. The station consists of one island platform in the median of Main Street.

== Nearby landmarks ==
- Downtown Mesa
- Mesa Arts Center
- Mesa City Plaza, city government offices
- Benedictine University
- Mesa Convention Center and Amphitheater
- Mesa Library, main branch
- Arizona Museum of Natural History
- Jimmy John’s #1997

== Connections ==
Valley Metro Bus	Route number	Route name	North/east end	South/west end
Valley Metro Bus	40	Main Street	Superstition Springs Transit Center	Sycamore/Main Street Transit Center
Valley Metro Bus	112	Country Club Drive/Arizona Avenue	Terminus (select weekday trips)	Chandler Park-and-Ride
Valley Metro Bus	DBUZ	Downtown BUZZ	Terminus	Mesa Riverview
