= A Mountain =

A Mountain may refer to the local name of several mountains or hills upon which has been placed the letter "A," usually signifying the first initial of a nearby university. Includes the following mountains:

- Sentinel Peak (Arizona), University of Arizona
- Tempe Butte, Arizona State University
- Tortugas Mountain, New Mexico State University
