= Alma School/Main Street station =

Light rail station in Mesa, Arizona

Alma School/Main St
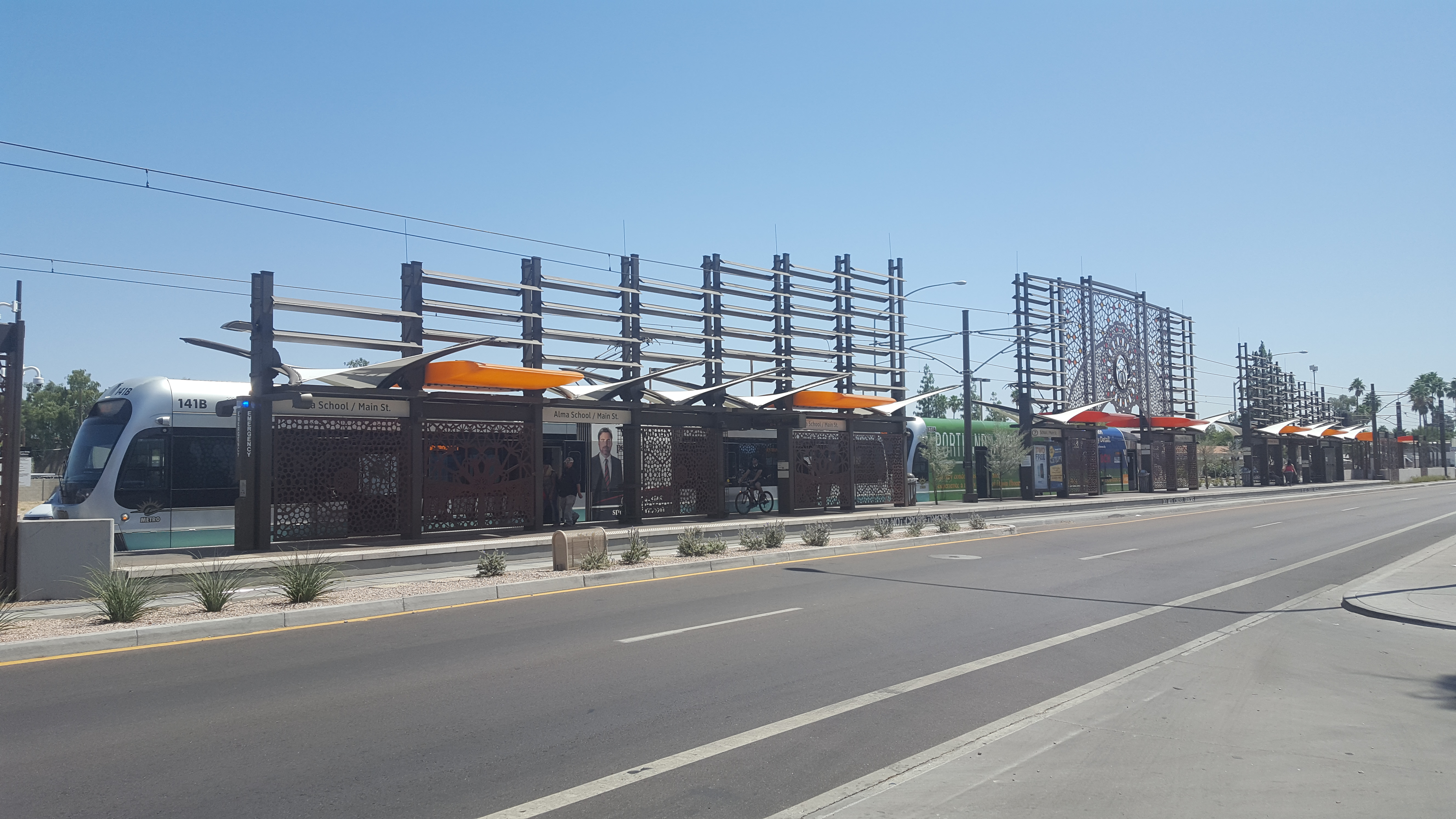

General information
- Location: Main Street and Alma School Road, Mesa, Arizona; United States
- Coordinates: 33°24′54″N 111°51′20″W
- Owner: Valley Metro
- Operator: Valley Metro Rail & Streetcar
- Platforms: 1 island platform
- Tracks: 2
- Connections: Valley Metro Bus: 40, 104

Construction
- Structure type: At-grade
- Accessible: Yes

Other information
- Station code: 18600

History
- Opened: August 22, 2015

Services
| Preceding station | Valley Metro | Following station |
|---|---|---|
| Sycamore/Main Street toward Downtown Phoenix Hub | A Line | Country Club/Main Street toward Gilbert Road/Main Street |
Location

Alma School/Main Street station is a station on the A Line of the Valley Metro Rail & Streetcar system in Mesa, Arizona, United States. The station is located one block east of the intersection of West Main Street and Alma School Road and opened on August 22, 2015 as part of the Central Mesa Extension. The station consists of one island platform located in the median of Main Street.

== Connections ==
| Valley Metro Bus | Route number | Route name | North/east end | South/west end | |
|---|---|---|---|---|---|
| Valley Metro Bus | 40 | Main Street | Superstition Springs Transit Center | Sycamore/Main Street Transit Center | |
| Valley Metro Bus | 104 | Alma School Road | Mesa Riverview | Alma School Road/ Southern Avenue | Morelos Street/Hamilton Street (weekdays only) |
