= List of hillside letters in Arizona =

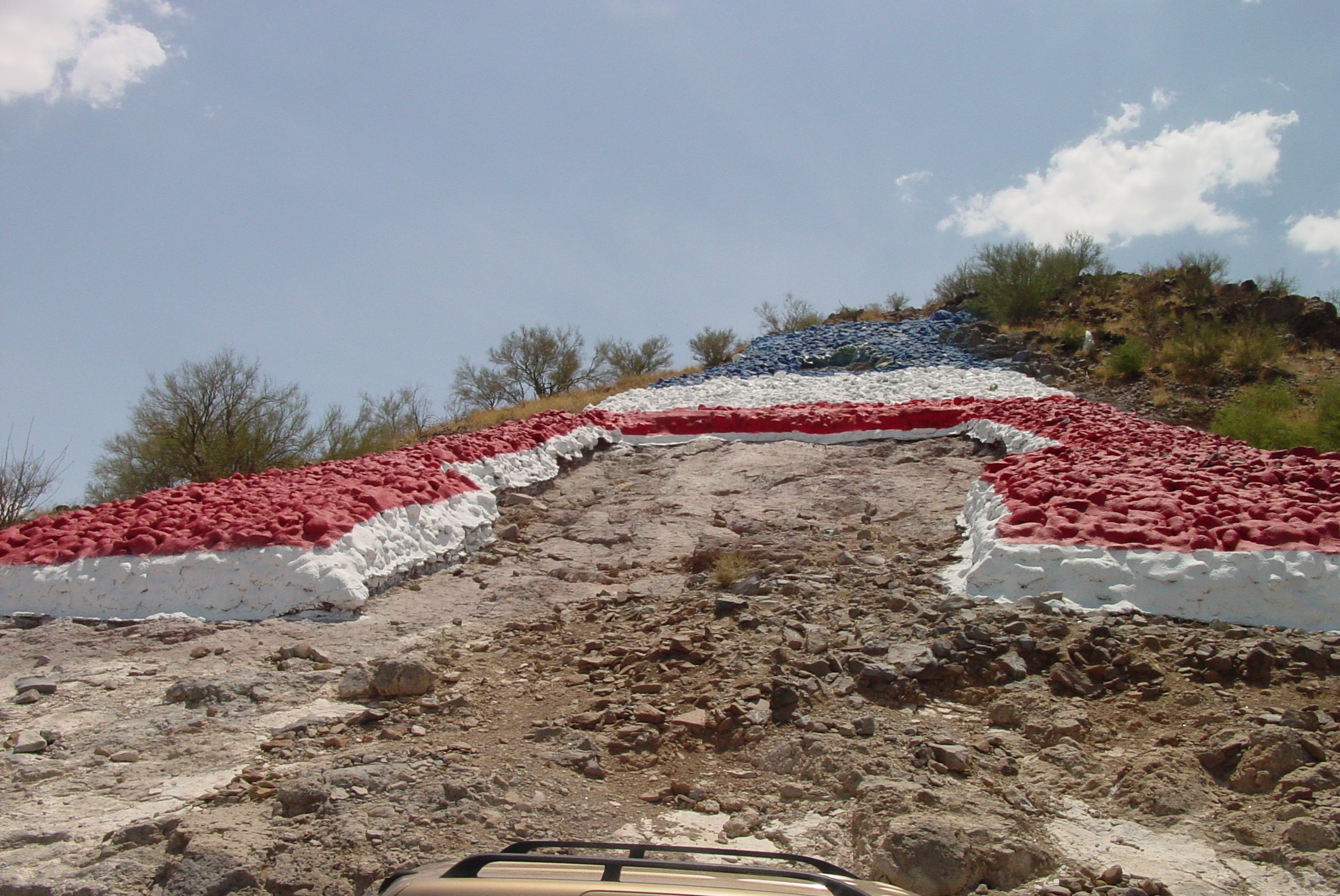
Tucson's "A" Mountain

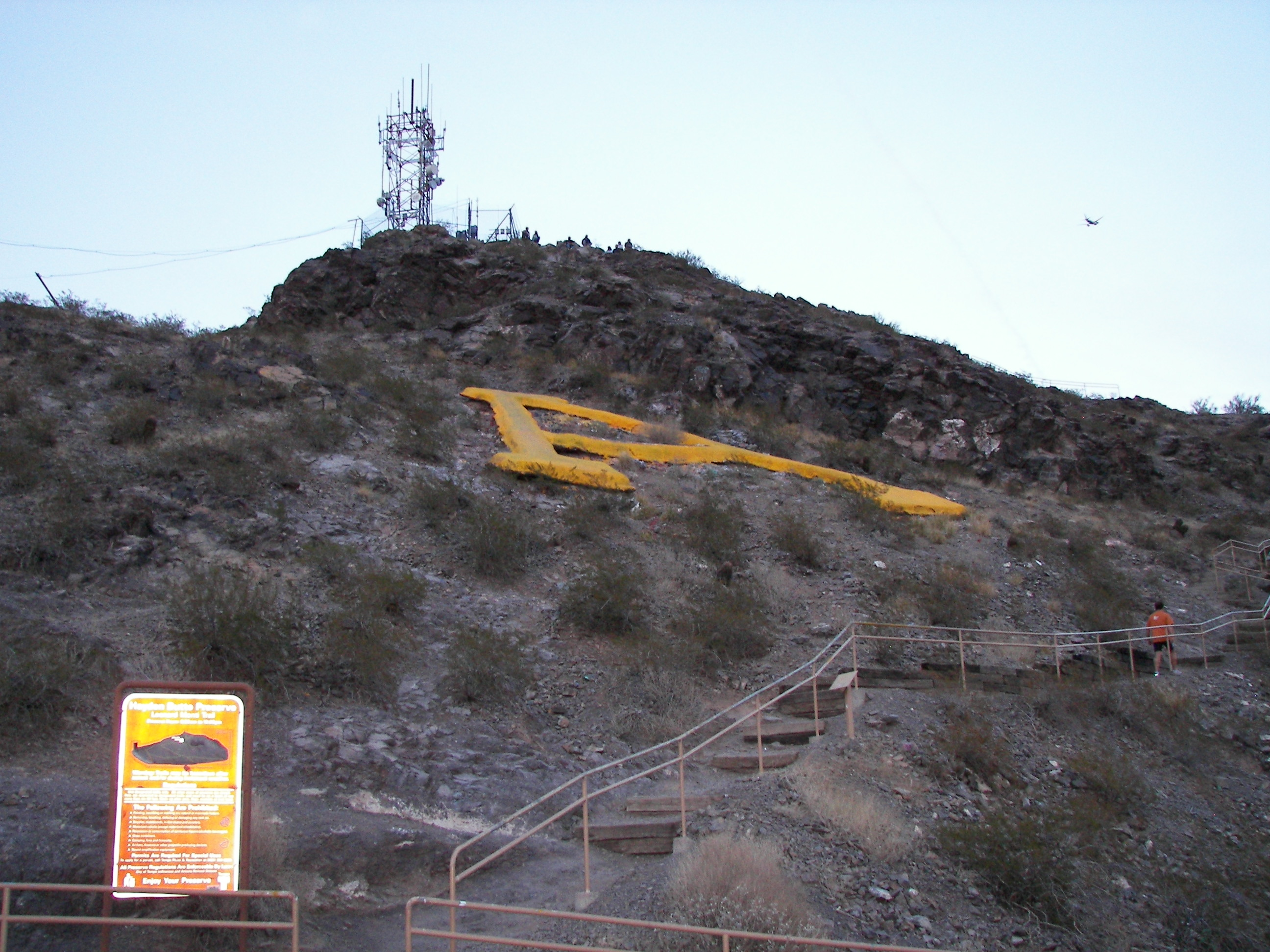
The A on Tempe Butte for Arizona State University

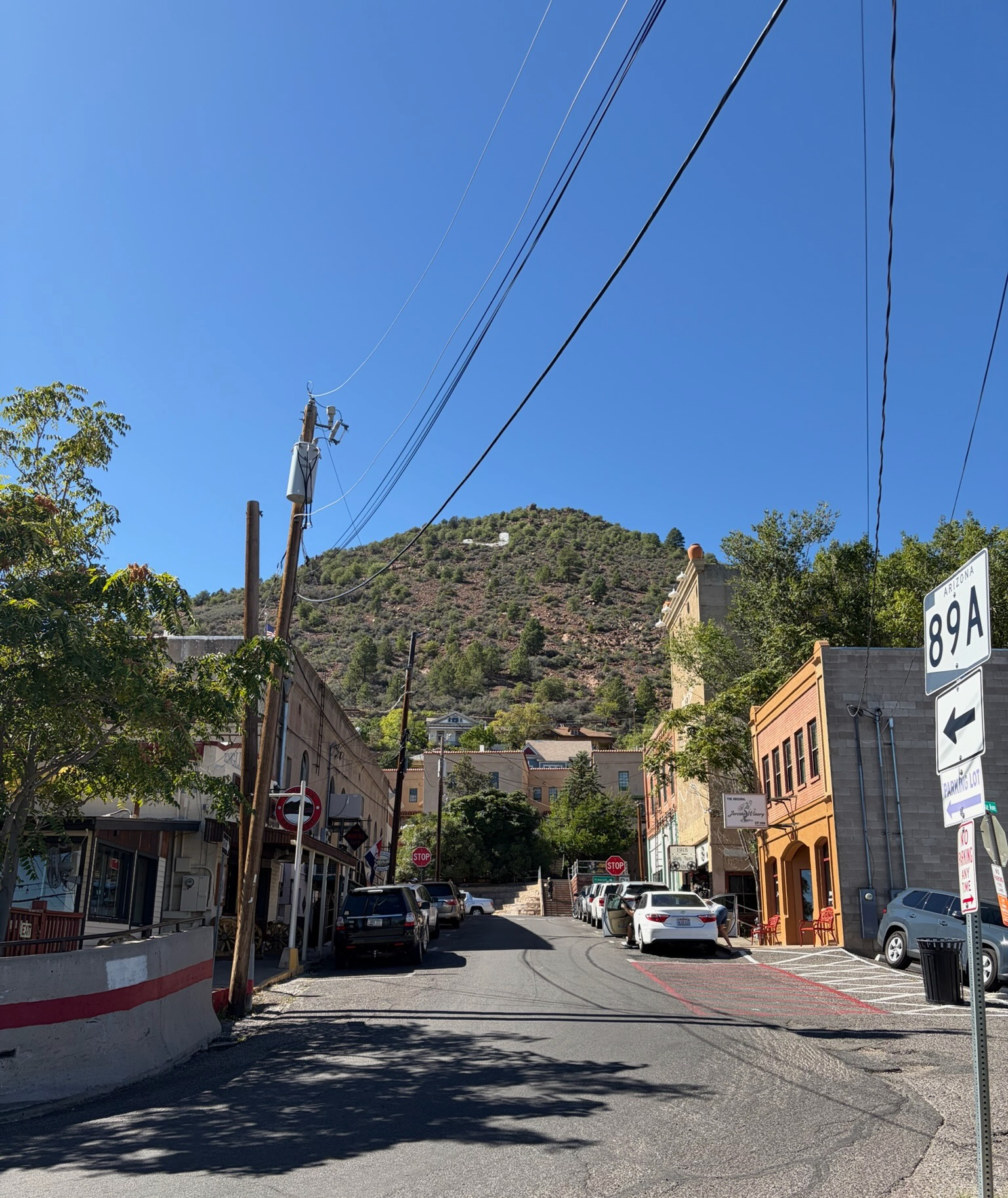
Jerome's "J" on Cleopatra Hill

This is a list of hillside letters (also known as mountain monograms) in the U.S. state of Arizona. There are at least 63 hillside letters, acronyms, and messages in the state, possibly more. Arizona's most notable monograms are likely the pair of A's for Arizona State University and the University of Arizona that are a focus of their rivalry. Arizona also has a fictional monogram, the RS for Radiator Springs in the movie Cars.

Monogram	Town	Description	Location
A	Ajo		32.3654°N 112.8766°W
A	Arivaca		31.588991°N 111.339277°W
A	Tacna	Antelope Union High School	32.7012°N 114.0125°W
A	Tempe	Arizona State University, 1918 (N), 1925 (T), 1938 (A)	33.4279°N 111.936°W
A	Tucson	Constructed on Sentinel Peak by University of Arizona students in 1916.	32.2106°N 110.9917°W
AF	Ash Fork		35.2329°N 112.4773°W
B	Bagdad		34.5806°N 113.1802°W
B	Bisbee		31.4442°N 109.9107°W
B	Bouse		33.9418°N 113.9949°W
B	Sanders	Sanders Middle School Braves	35.2207°N 109.3283°W
CG	Casa Grande		32.8277°N 111.7211°W
C	Chinle		36.15576°N 109.62497°W
C	Chloride		35.419°N 114.1885°W
C	Clarkdale		34.7831°N 112.0666°W
C	Clifton		33.0435°N 109.3001°W
C	Concho		34.4753°N 109.5956°W
C	Coolidge		33.0644°N 111.5146°W
C	Cottonwood		34.7307°N 112.0268°W
DILKON	Dilkon		35.3835°N 110.3234°W
DS	Dolan Springs		35.5843°N 114.2859°W
D	Douglas		31.3467°N 109.4777°W
D	Duncan		32.7252°N 109.1116°W
EF	Goodyear	Estrella Foothills High School	33.3370124°N 112.4082473°W
F	Florence		33.0545°N 111.4082°W
T	Fort Thomas		33.0702°N 109.9453°W
F	Fredonia		36.9781°N 112.525°W
G	Ganado		35.7137°N 109.5303°W
G	The Gap		36.3195°N 111.464°W
G	Globe		33.3944°N 110.7899°W
HALL	Springerville	Hall Trucking & Materials	34.1047°N 109.2408°W
H	Hayden	Hayden High School	32.9934°N 110.774°W
H (no longer exists)	Holbrook		34.9092°N 110.1726°W
J	Jerome		34.7487°N 112.1192°W
JC	Joseph City		34.9654°N 110.3179°W
K	Kayenta		36.7374°N 110.2613°W
K	Kingman		35.1961°N 114.0549°W
L	Laveen		33.3458°N 112.1652°W
M	Maricopa		33.1455°N 112.0192°W
M	Mayer		34.352573°N 112.159067°W
M	Miami		33.397°N 110.8765°W
M	Moenkopi	Part of the Hopi Reservation	36.114695°N 111.230693°W
M	Morenci		33.0402°N 109.3211°W
P	Page		36.8815°N 111.4905°W
P	Parker		34.1234°N 114.2217°W
P	Prescott		34.541°N 112.429°W
<PHOENIX	Mesa		33.492°N 111.63°W
Q	Quartzsite		33.6523°N 114.2303°W
R	Kearny	Ray High School	33.0499°N 110.9314°W
RV	Eagar	Round Valley High School	34.1198°N 109.2803°W
S	Salome		33.7653°N 113.5574°W
SD	Seba Dalkai		35.4855°N 110.4538°W
S	Seligman		35.3683°N 112.8989°W
S	Snowflake		34.5246°N 110.08833°W
SJ	St. Johns		34.5082°N 109.2965°W
S	Phoenix	Sunnyslope High School	33.5739°N 112.0766°W
S	Superior		33.2818°N 111.0958°W
T	Tempe		33.407°N 111.9672°W
T	Phoenix	Thunderbird High School	33.6151°N 112.0965°W
T	Tombstone		31.7194°N 110.0737°W
TC	Tuba City	Part of the Navajo Nation	36.1329°N 111.2239°W
TEEC NOS POS	Teec Nos Pos		36.9347°N 109.0911°W
V	Elfrida	Valley Union High School	31.6979°N 109.5714°W
W	Wickenburg		33.981°N 112.7192°W
W	Willcox		32.3465°N 109.8395°W
WR	Fort Defiance	Window Rock High School	35.7262°N 109.0743°W
W	Woodruff		34.7967°N 110.0421°W
Y	Yarnell		34.2218°N 112.7414°W
