= Country Club/Main Street station =

Light rail station in Mesa, Arizona

Country Club/Main St
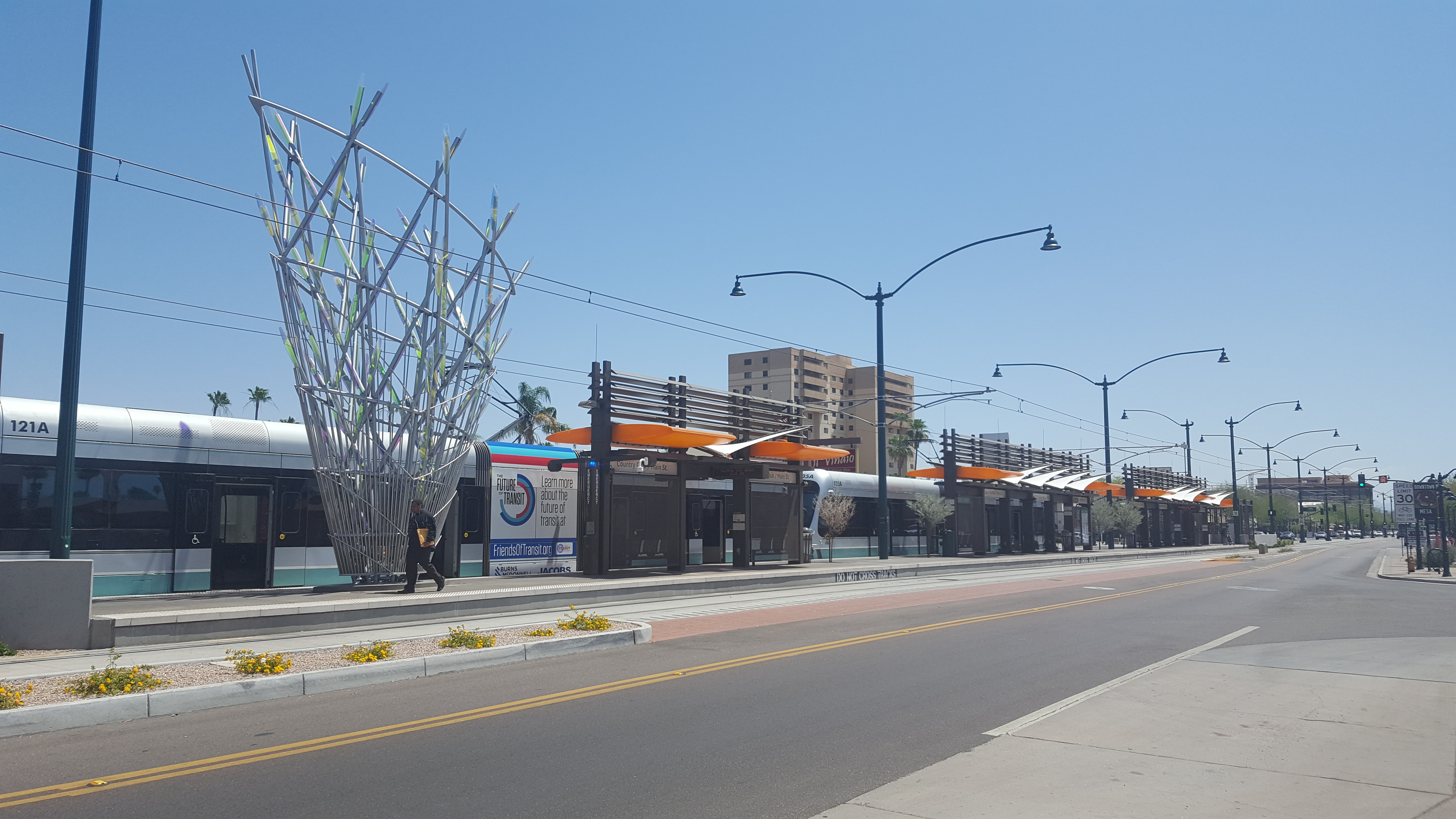

General information
- Other names: Center for Higher Education
- Location: Main Street and Country Club Drive, Mesa, Arizona; United States
- Coordinates: 33°24′54.46″N 111°50′20.72″W
- Owner: Valley Metro
- Operator: Valley Metro Rail & Streetcar
- Platforms: 1 island platform
- Tracks: 2
- Connections: Valley Metro Bus: 40, 112

Construction
- Structure type: At-grade
- Accessible: Yes

Other information
- Station code: 18601

History
- Opened: August 22, 2015

Services
Preceding station	Valley Metro	Following station
Alma School/Main Street toward Downtown Phoenix Hub	A Line	Center/Main Street toward Gilbert Road/Main Street
Location

Country Club/Main Street station, also known as Center for Higher Education, is a station on the A Line of the Valley Metro Rail & Streetcar system in Mesa, Arizona, United States. The station is located one block east of the intersection of West Main Street and South Country Club Drive and opened on August 22, 2015, as part of Central Mesa Extension. The station consists of one island platform located in the median of Main Street.

== Nearby landmarks ==
- Western end of Downtown Mesa
- I.d.e.a. Museum
- Mesa Center for Higher Education
- Mesa Police Headquarters

== Connections ==
Valley Metro Bus	Route number	Route name	North/east end		South/west end
Valley Metro Bus	40	Main Street	Superstition Springs Transit Center		Sycamore/Main Street Transit Center
Valley Metro Bus	112	Country Club Drive/Arizona Avenue	Center Street/ McKellips Road	Center/Main Street station (select weekday trips)	Chandler Park-and-Ride
