= List of United States bike stations =

This is a list of bicycle parking stations in the United States. A bicycle parking station or bike station is a building or structure designed for bicycle commuters that typically requires users to join as members in order to use secure bike parking, and sometimes showers or lockers. Some bike stations are staffed and offer free valet parking during certain hours.

- Arizona
  - Tempe Transportation Center in Tempe - Bicycle Cellar - Located at the Tempe Transportation Center and the light rail station.
- California
  - Long Beach - Bike station near the Metro Blue Line 1st Street station.
  - Downtown Berkeley BART Station in Berkeley - Operated by Alameda Bicycle. video of this facility from Streetfilms
  - Embarcadero BART Station in San Francisco - Inside the Embarcadero BART station operated by Alameda Bicycle.
  - Fruitvale BART Station in Oakland - Operated by Alameda Bicycle at the Fruitvale (BART) station.
  - Palo Alto (Caltrain station) in Palo Alto - Bikestation-branded operated by Palo Alto Bicycles. Not staffed. More information on Bikestation's website.
  - Santa Barbara - Located inside the Granada Garage (auto parking) across from the Santa Barbara County Courthouse. More information on Bikestation's website.
- Illinois
  - McDonald's Cycle Center in Chicago - Located at the north end of Millennium Park across from the Illinois Center, a collection of office buildings north of Randolph Street between Michigan Avenue and Columbus Drive.
- Missouri
  - St. Louis - Downtown Bicycle Station located at 10th & Locust. Operated by Trailnet and Urban Shark Bicycle Company. Offers showers, lockers, secure bike storage, rentals and repairs.
- Pennsylvania
  - Pittsburgh - Bicycle Commuter Center - Inside two used shipping container are 26 securely accessed bicycle parking spaces at the Century Building at 130 7th Street.
- Texas
  - Austin - Mellow Johnny's, owned by Lance Armstrong, and near the Austin Music Hall, has Commuter Hub offering free showers, lockers (bring your own lock), and parking. More information.
- Washington
  - Seattle - Bikestation-branded facility operated by Bicycle Alliance of Washington.
- Washington, D.C. - Bikestation-branded facility at Union Station operated by Bike and Roll DC aka Unlimited Biking. Designed by KGP Design Studio, the facility offers non-member access during the day, 24/7 access to members, and bike rentals.
