= Sentinel Peak (Arizona) =

Mountain in Arizona, United States

- "A" Mountain
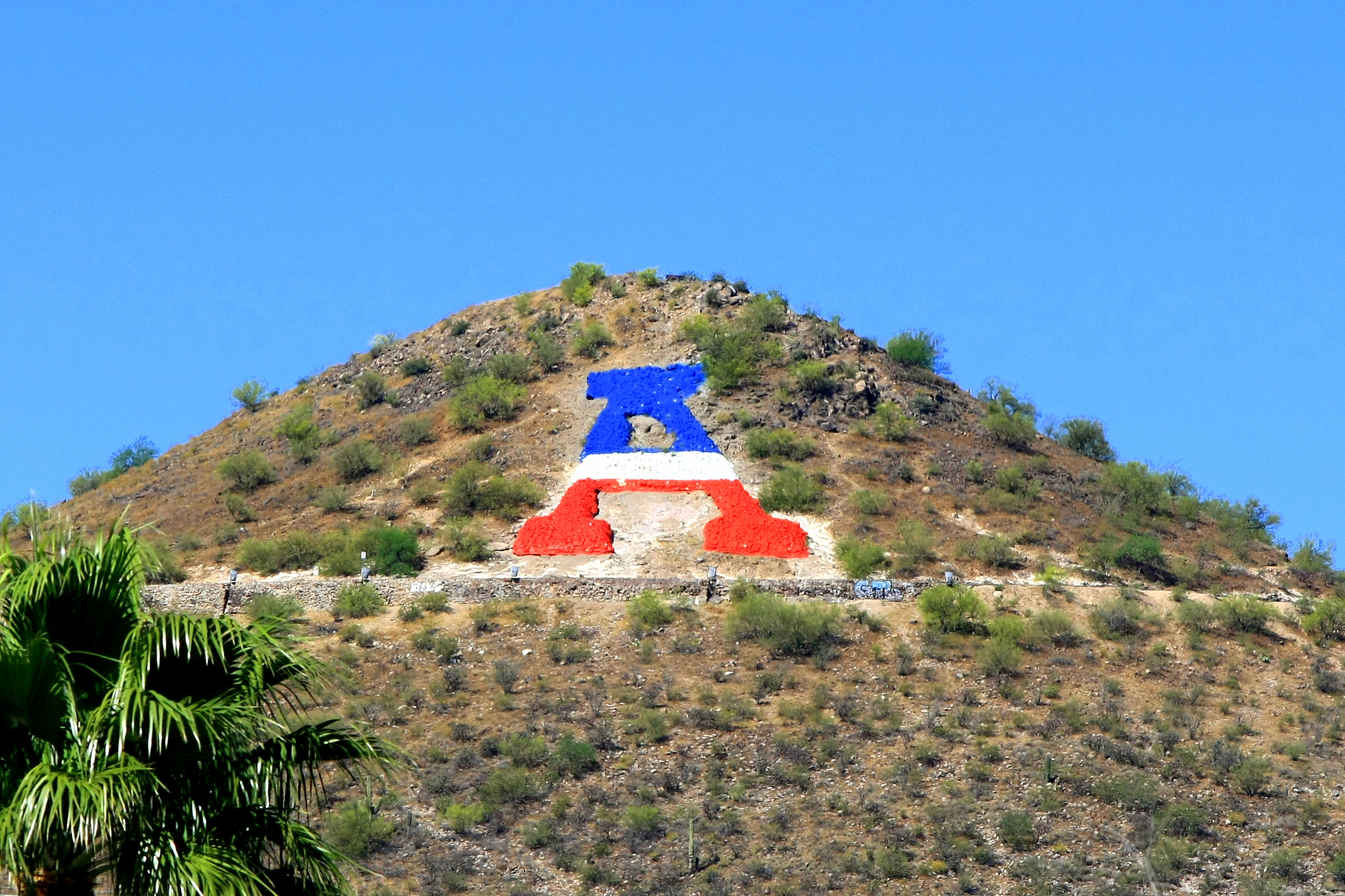
- The "A" on Sentinel Peak, pictured with its 2003-2013 color scheme.

Highest point
- Elevation: 2,901 ft (884 m) NAVD 88
- Prominence: 267 ft (81 m)
- Coordinates: 32°12′37″N 110°59′32″W

Geography
- Location within Arizona
- Location: City of Tucson; Pima County, Arizona, U.S.
- Parent range: Tucson Mountains
- Topo map: USGS Tucson

Sentinel Peak is a 2,897 ft (900 m) peak in the Tucson Mountains southwest of downtown Tucson, Arizona, United States. The valley's first inhabitants grew crops at the mountain's base, along the Santa Cruz River. The name "Tucson" is derived from the O'odham Cuk Ṣon ([tʃʊk ʂɔːn]), meaning "the base [of the mountain] is black". In the 1910s, University of Arizona students used local basalt rock to construct a 160 ft (50 m) tall block "A" on the mountain's east face, near its summit, giving the peak its other name, "A" Mountain. The peak is part of a 272-acre (110 hectares) park, the largest natural resource park in the City of Tucson.

== Early history ==
The fertile land at the base of Sentinel Peak was used for agriculture from c. 2000 BCE until the 1930s. Bedrock mortars found on the sides of the peak are believed to have been used to grind corn and mesquite beans into flour. In the 1690s, the O'odham people living in the area were visited by Eusebio Francisco Kino, who established the nearby Mission San Xavier del Bac. After Presidio San Agustín del Tucsón was constructed in 1775, sentinels were stationed on the peak to watch for raiding Apaches. Mission Garden, a living agricultural museum at the foot of Sentinel Peak, celebrates this history.

== Geology ==
Sentinel Peak is made up of several layers of igneous rock representing various types of volcanic activity, though the mountain itself is not a volcano. It is one of a cluster of outcroppings at the eastern edge of the Tucson Mountains that are primarily the remnants of 20–30 million-year-old (Ma) lava flows that once extended west towards the Tucson Mountains and east into the Tucson Basin, where the city is now. Erosion and faulting are responsible for the peak's conical shape.

The layer of rock at the peak of the hill is a basaltic andesite dating to 23–24 Ma. This caps a 30–36 m (98–118 ft)-thick layer of tuff (compacted volcanic ash) above another layer of basaltic andesite, both dating to 26–28 Ma. Tuffs and andesite exposed at the base of the hill, on the south side, date to approximately 60 Ma.

Volcanic ash and breccia, along with ancient lava beds, or lahars, can also be found on the mountain, further evidence of a once active volcanic field that formed the Tucson Mountain range.

== Etymology ==
On October 3, 2016, in the Arizona Daily Star newspaper, historian David Leighton explained the origin of the name Sentinel Peak:

He wrote that in the very early days of Tucson, an Indian fortification was constructed at the top of a small mountain that would come to be called Sentinel Peak – also sometimes referred to as Picket Post Butte. This Indian fortification in time became known as the sentinel station because a sentinel or guard was posted there to watch for approaching enemies, likely Apache Indians. During the U.S. Civil War, armed guards or soldiers were posted at the sentinel station and a canvas was stretched across the stone fortification, to keep the sun from hitting directly on the men posted there.

By 1883, only ruins of the fortification remained. The remains included, "A circular wall, about 3 feet thick and made of boulders, [that] enclosed an area about 8 feet in diameter. North of the circular structure was a small wall, roughly two feet high and about 10 feet long. To the east were traces of another, smaller circular wall."

In 1925, the remains of the fortifications still existed at the top of what by then was being called "A" Mountain, although it is unknown what exactly was left at that point.

The origin of the name Sentinel Peak, according to Leighton, "comes from the sentinel station and the sentinel stationed there."

== The "A" ==
After Arizona's 7–6 victory over Pomona College in 1914, a civil engineering student on the team convinced one of his professors to make a class project of the survey and design for a huge block "A" on Sentinel Peak. Students carried the project to completion on March 4, 1916, when the 70 ft (20 m) wide, 160 ft (50 m) tall "A" was whitewashed on the east side of the peak. The basalt rock used in the construction of the "A" was hauled from a quarry at the mountain's base, which supplied stone for many foundations and walls throughout Tucson, including the wall surrounding the University of Arizona campus.

The "A" has traditionally been painted white. On March 23, 2003, four days after the start of the Iraq War, it was painted black in protest. Two weeks later, following much public debate, the Tucson City Council resolved to have the "A" painted red, white, and blue in honor of American troops. A decade later, the council decided to restore it to its traditional white. The "A" has on occasion been painted green for St. Patrick's Day. On April 30, 2018, it was painted red in support of the Red for Ed movement, and on May 8, 2020, it was painted blue to honor local healthcare workers during the COVID-19 pandemic. On May 1, 2024, it was painted in the colors of the Palestinian flag in protest of the Gaza war, although it was reverted shortly afterwards.

Arizona State University (ASU) has a more recently created "A" Mountain (Tempe Butte) near the school's football stadium. During the week of the Arizona – ASU Territorial Cup game, rival fans and students have tried and at times succeeded in painting the "A" of the opposing school with their own school colors.

== Gallery ==
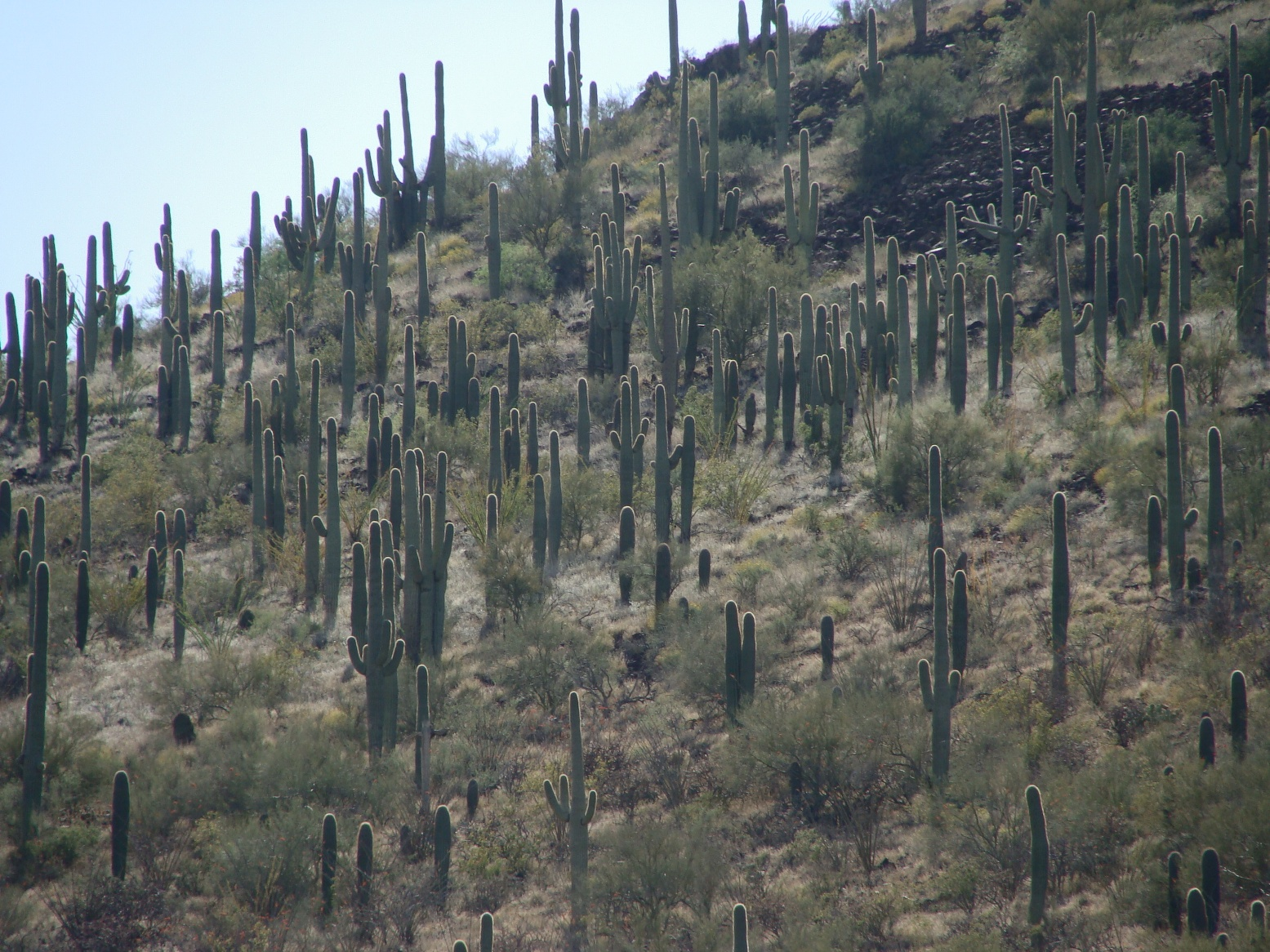
Dense stands of saguaros at the base of Sentinel Peak

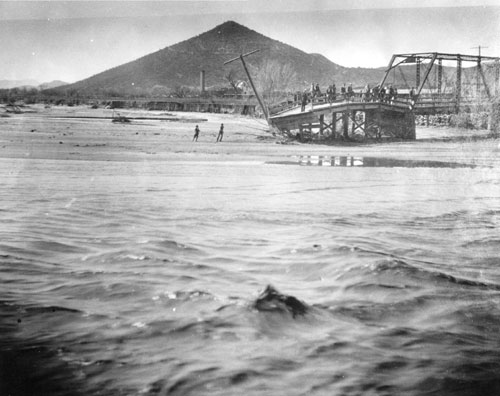
Sentinel Peak, standing behind a wrecked bridge along the Santa Cruz River during the flood of 1915

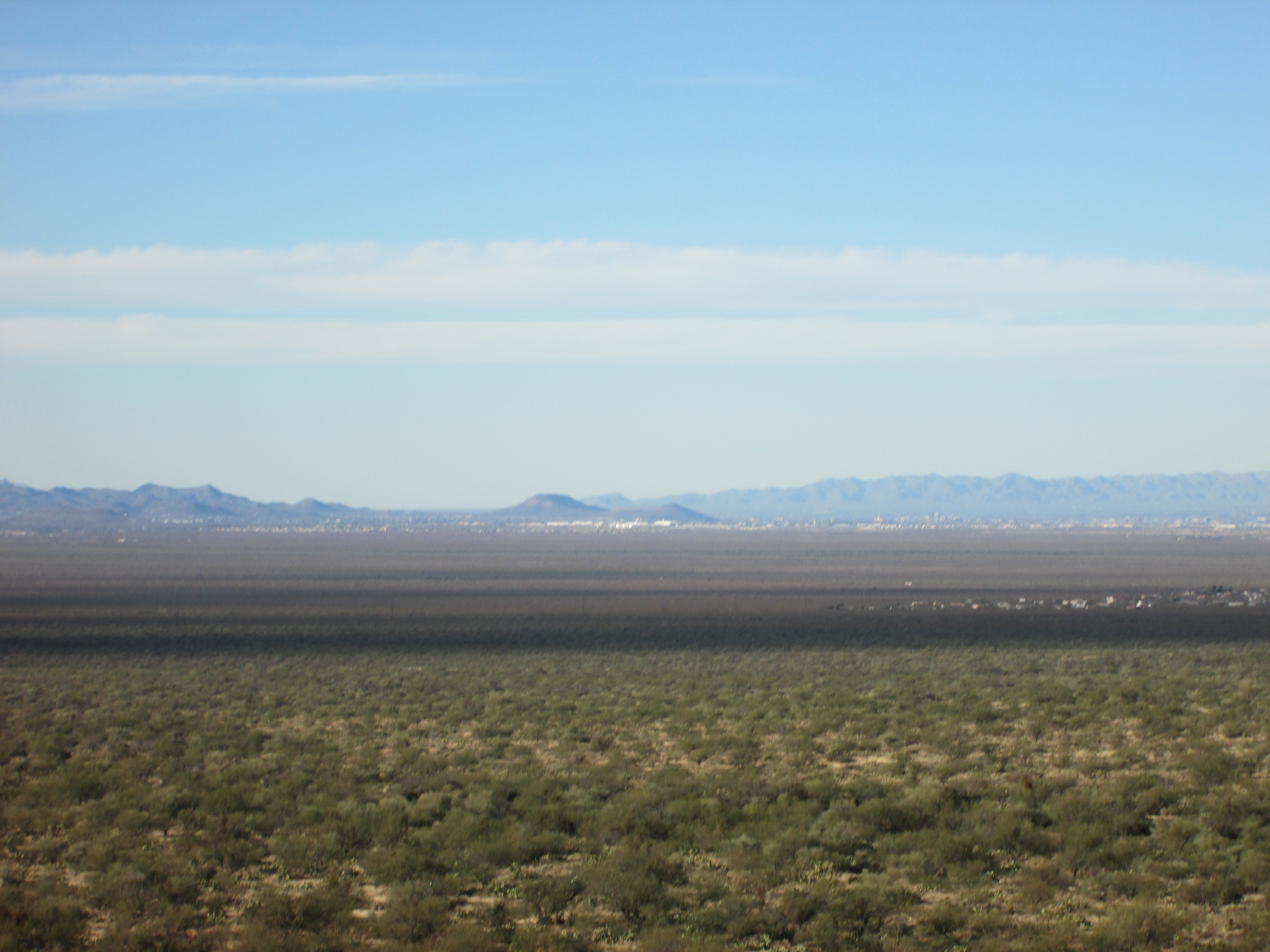
"A" Mountain (right) and Tumamoc Hill (left) in the distance, looking west across the Tucson Valley

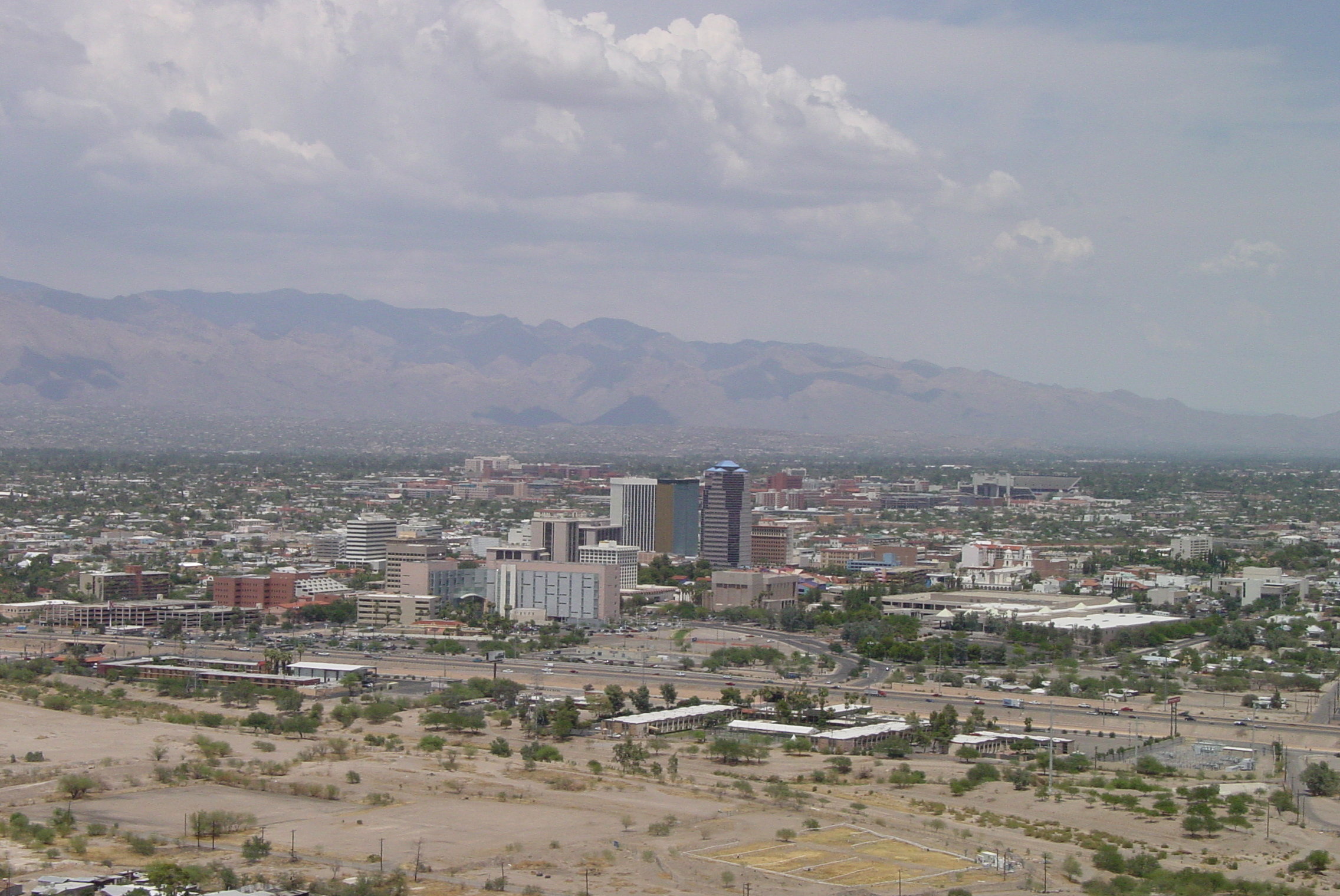
Tucson as seen from Sentinel Peak

== See also ==
- List of mountains and hills of Arizona by height
- University of Arizona
- List of hillside letters in Arizona
- Y Mountain
