= Sycamore/Main Street station =

Light rail station in Mesa, Arizona

Sycamore/Main St
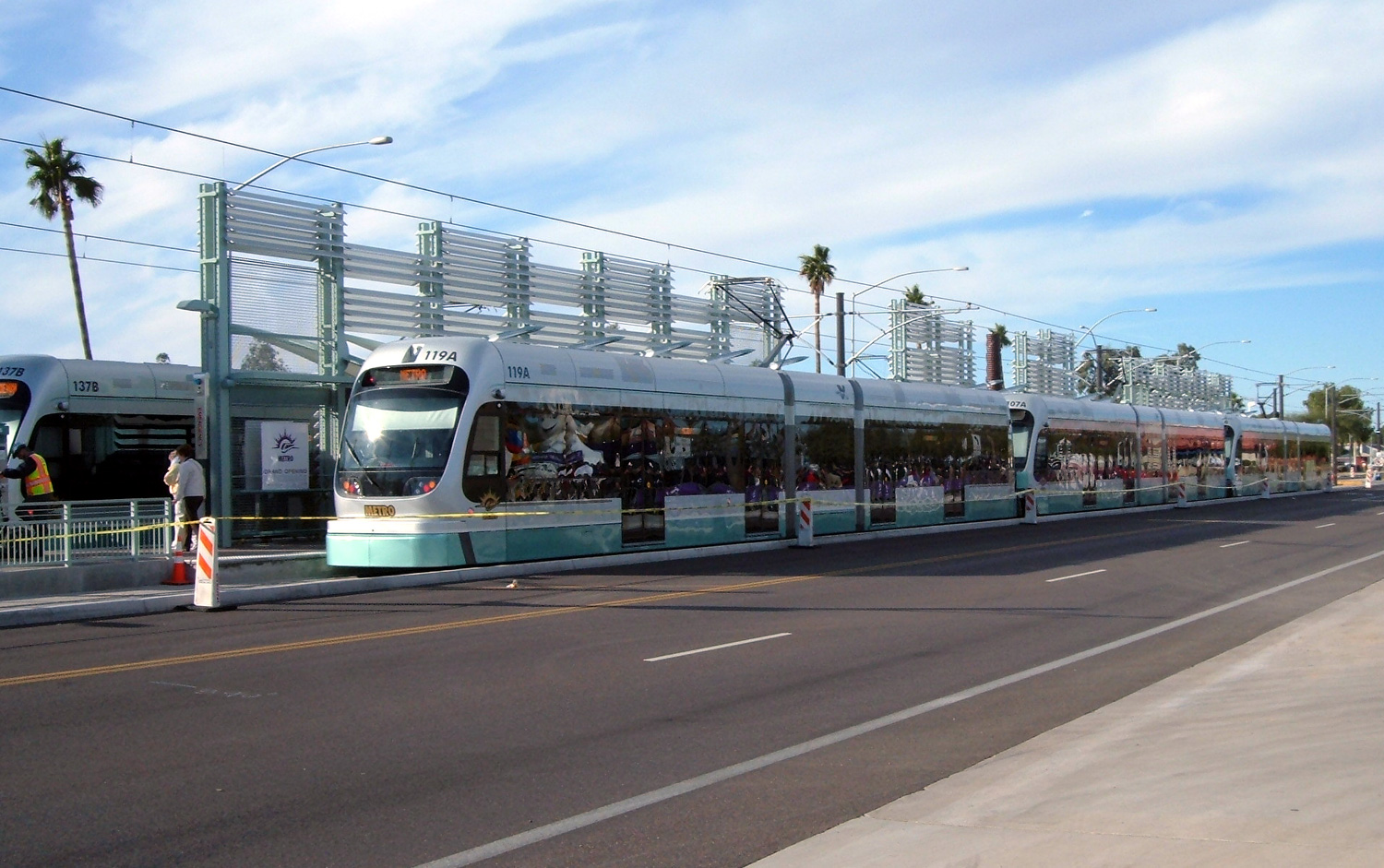
- The station during its first day of service on December 27, 2008

General information
- Other names: Tri-City (former); Asian District
- Location: Main Street and Sycamore Street, Mesa, Arizona; United States
- Coordinates: 33°24′53.50″N 111°52′16″W
- Owner: Valley Metro
- Operator: Valley Metro Rail & Streetcar
- Platforms: 1 island platform
- Tracks: 2
- Connections: Valley Metro Bus: 30, 40, 96, FBUZ

Construction
- Structure type: At-grade
- Parking: 802 spaces
- Accessible: Yes

Other information
- Station code: 10028

History
- Opened: December 27, 2008

Services
Preceding station	Valley Metro	Following station
Price–101 Freeway/Apache Boulevard toward Downtown Phoenix Hub	A Line	Alma School/Main Street toward Gilbert Road/Main Street
Location

Sycamore/Main Street station, also known as Asian District, is a station on the A Line of the Valley Metro Rail & Streetcar system in Mesa, Arizona, United States. The station is located one block east of the intersection of Dobson Road and Main Street, in front of the former Tri City Mall. It was the original eastern terminus for Valley Metro Rail when the line opened in 2008.

The station consists of one island platform in the median of Main Street, and is located next to a transit center for Valley Metro buses. Adjacent to Mekong Plaza and other East Asian businesses, it serves as an access point to Mesa's Asian district. A large park and ride lot is adjacent to the station's bus terminal on the north side of Main Street.

== Ridership ==
Weekday rail passengers
Year	In	Out	Average daily in	Average daily out
2009	833,725	853,049	3,282	3,358
2010	917,806	933,379	3,628	3,689
2011	949,373	981,458	3,797	3,925
2012	984,198	1,003,966	3,936	4,015
2013	969,453	990,591	3,877	3,962
2014	955,823	981,371	3,823	3,925
2015	934,769	959,130	3,739	3,836

== Nearby landmarks ==
- East Valley Institute of Technology
- Mesa Riverview
- Mekong Plaza
- Mesa's Asian District

== Connections ==
Valley Metro Bus	Route number	Route name	North/east end	South/west end		
Valley Metro Bus	30	University Drive	University Drive/Power Road	24th Street/Baseline Park-and-Ride	South Mountain Community College (select weekday trips)	
Valley Metro Bus	40	Main Street	Superstition Springs Transit Center	Terminus		
Valley Metro Bus	96	Dobson Road	Mesa Riverview	Snedigar Sportsplex (select weekday trips)	Pecos Road/ Dobson Road	Baseline Road/Dobson Road (select trips)
Valley Metro Bus	FBUZ	Fiesta BUZZ	Mesa Riverview	Southern Avenue/Alma School Road		
