= Tempe Marketplace =

Arizona shopping mall opened 2007

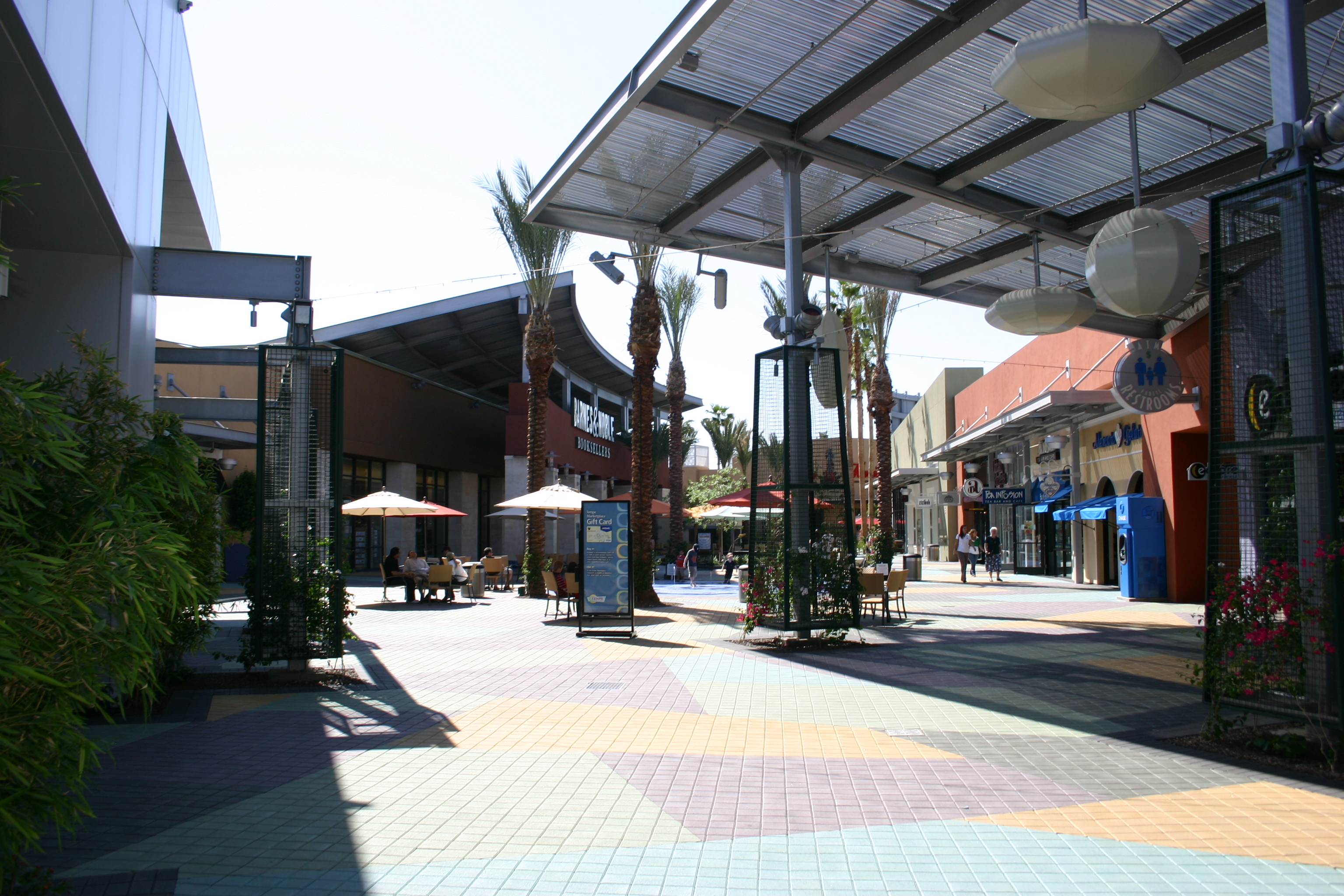
- Coordinates: 33°25′55″N 111°54′10″W
- Address: 2000 East Rio Salado Parkway; Tempe, Arizona 85281
- Opened: September 28, 2007
- Developer: Vestar Development Company
- Manager: Vestar Development Company
- Owner: Vestar Development Company
- Architect: Buttler Design Group
- Num. of stores: 100+
- Floor area: 1,300,000 square feet (120,000 m^{2})
- Floors: 2 (As the Cadillac Ranch Level that is Vacant)
- Parking: 5,986 outdoor at grade spaces
- Website: tempemarketplace.com

Tempe Marketplace is an open-air shopping center located in Tempe, Arizona. It is located along the Salt River near the interchange of Loop 101 (the Pima/Price Freeway) and Loop 202 (the Red Mountain Freeway) near the Tempe borders with Mesa and the Salt River Pima-Maricopa Indian Community.

== History ==
The center was developed by the Vestar Development Company (who is its owner and operator) and opened on September 28, 2007. The center covers nearly 1,300,000 square feet (120,000 m^{2}) of retail space on 130 acres (0.53 km^{2}) of land that was once a landfill considered so toxic, it was put on the U.S. E.P.A. Superfund List in 1983. It was removed 20 years later. During initial development, collaboration between the developers and the City of Tempe was required to acquire land from 52 individual lot owners for the shopping center, which resulted in the largest Brownfield land cleanup in the history of Arizona.

Tempe Marketplace features over 100 retailers, complete with outdoor fireplaces, water features, and landscaping. There are two distinct areas for shopping and dining at the center: an outer ring of “Big Box” retailers, and the central area of smaller shops and eateries called “The District.” In the center of The District is a large courtyard with a stage, where various local and national musical acts have performed free concerts, such as Borns, Power an 5000, Buckcherry, Pop Evil, The Struts, Dreamers (band), Jet (Australian band), Trapt, Drowning Pool, and many others. There is also a large LED video screen which shows local sports teams and other special events to passersby. Many tall plants, shade structures, and misters help control the climate during the summers, and pedestrian walkways and other retail pads connect all areas.

The Harkins Theatre in The District is a 16-screen multiplex with 604 seats in its Cine Capri theater, which was the host to the worldwide premieres of both X-Men Origins: Wolverine and Only the Brave.
