= Mesa Riverview =

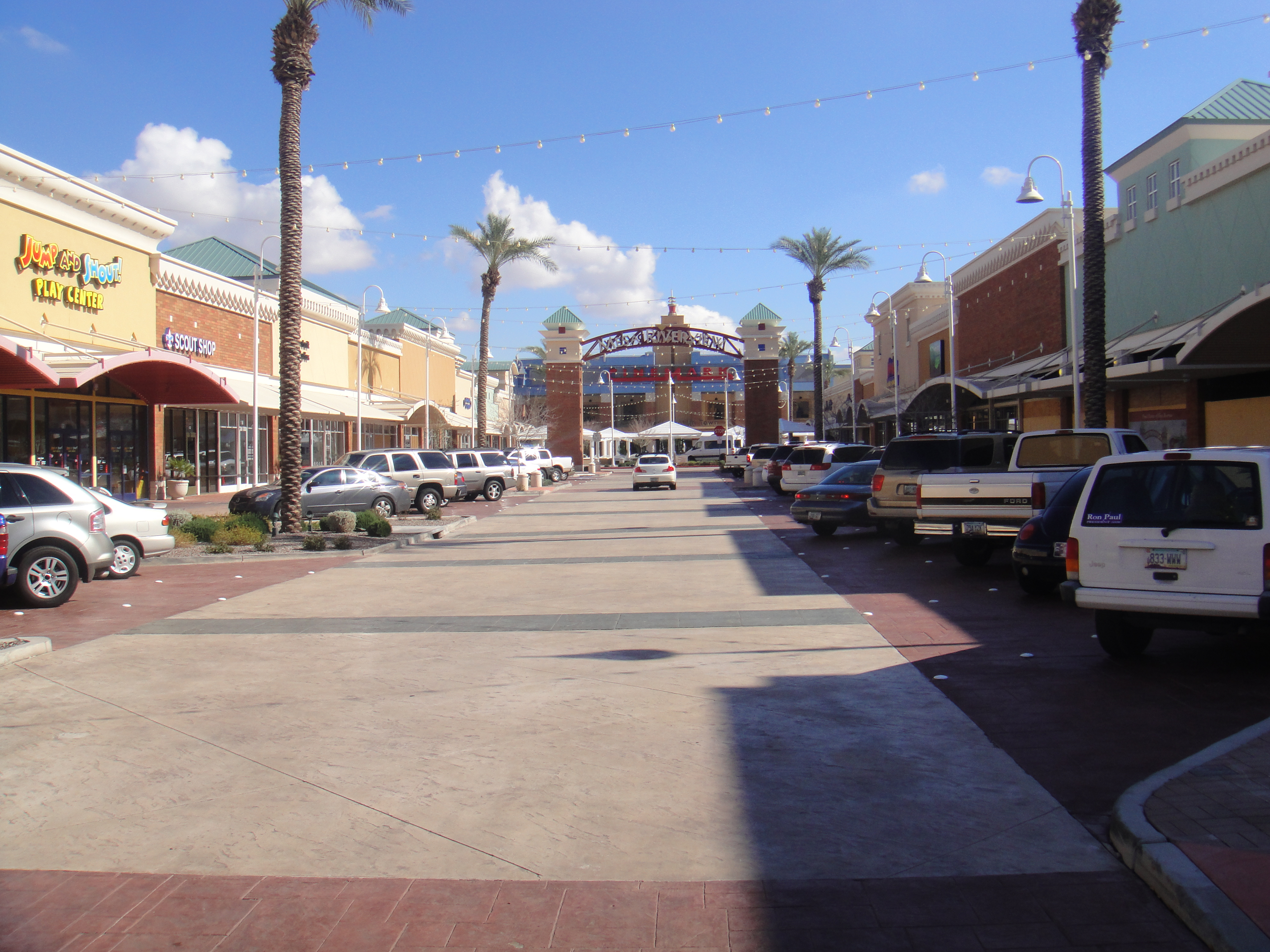
- Looking east down the street shops
- Location: Mesa, Arizona, United States
- Coordinates: 33°26′7.48″N 111°51′55.37″W
- Address: 1061 North Dobson Road
- Manager: Kimco Realty Corporation
- Owner: Kimco Realty Corporation
- Architect: Saemisch + Di Bella Architects
- Num. of stores: 85
- Floor area: 1,115,112 sq ft (103,597.3 m^{2})
- Floors: 1
- Parking: outdoor at grade parking
- Website: mesariverview.com

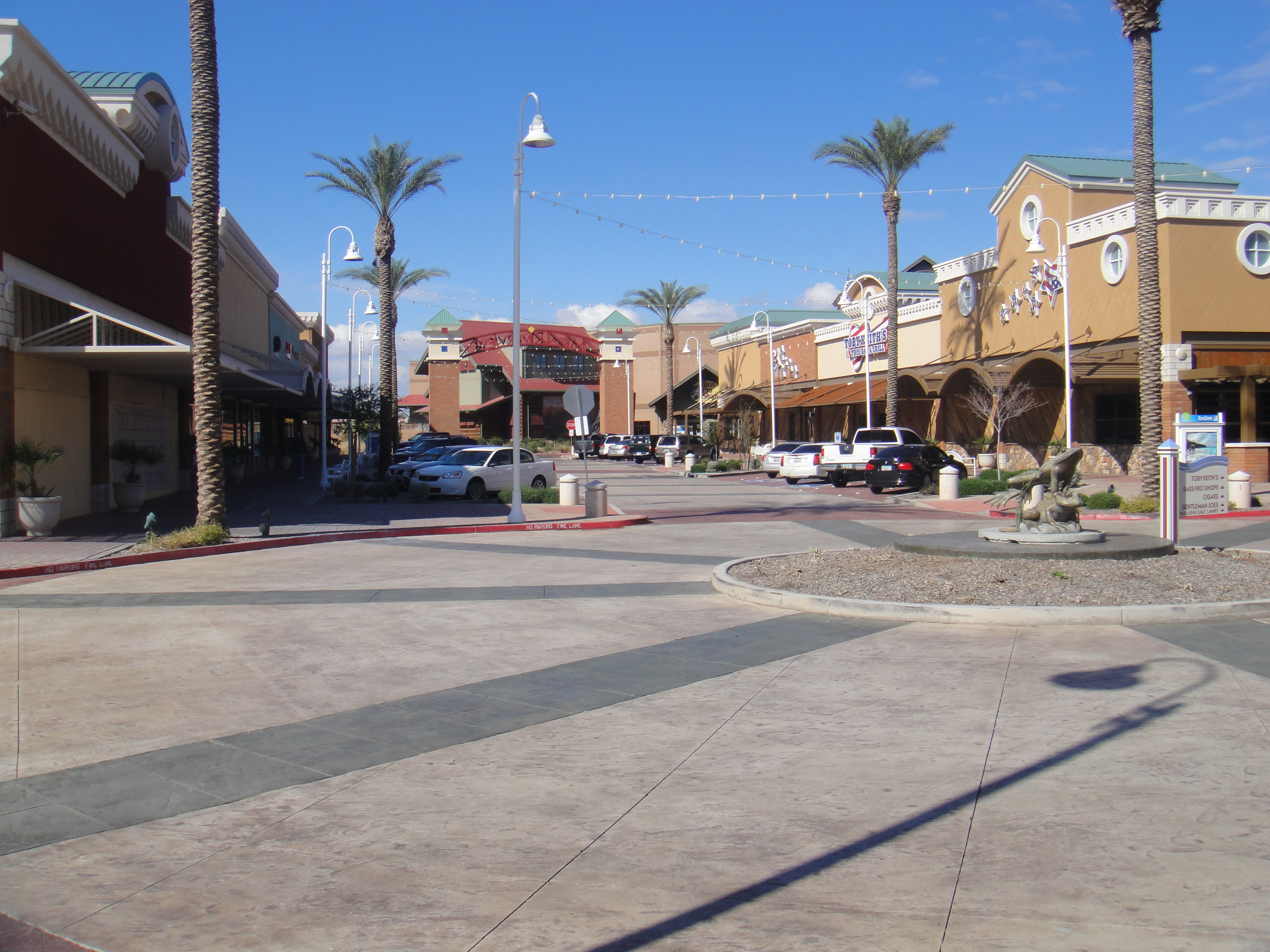

Mesa Riverview is an outdoor shopping center in Mesa, Arizona (part of the Phoenix metropolitan area) located in the northwestern corner of the city near Loop 202 and Dobson Road.

The shopping center has a gross leasable area of 1,115,112 square feet (103,000 m^{2}). Anchor stores include Bass Pro Shops, Cinemark Theatre, Home Depot, Bed Bath and Beyond, Petco, Walmart, Marshalls, Office Max, and Jo-Ann Fabrics.

The shopping center is currently owned by Kimco Realty Corp.

== History ==
De Rito Partners, the developer of the mall, began seeking approval from the Mesa City Council in 2005 with plans for commercial, retail, offices, and automotive dealers. Several ballot measures were proposed to change the zoning for the site, formerly a cotton field, and give tax incentives to the developers, which passed on referendum. Construction began in 2006 and stores began to open in 2007.

In 2012, part of the Mesa Riverview complex was demolished to provide a more pedestrian-friendly means of access to the outdoor parts of the mall. This was carefully observed by City of Mesa planning officials as the development had been given over $80 million in financing tax incentives to build the complex.

The property is located less than 2 miles (3.2 km) away from neighboring outdoor mall Tempe Marketplace in such a way that both malls compete for similar traffic, with Arizona State University students primarily being drawn to the Tempe Marketplace mall.

== See also ==
- Sloan Park
