= Tempe Butte =

Andesite butte in Maricopa County, Arizona

- "A" Mountain; O'odham: ʼOidbaḍ Doʼag
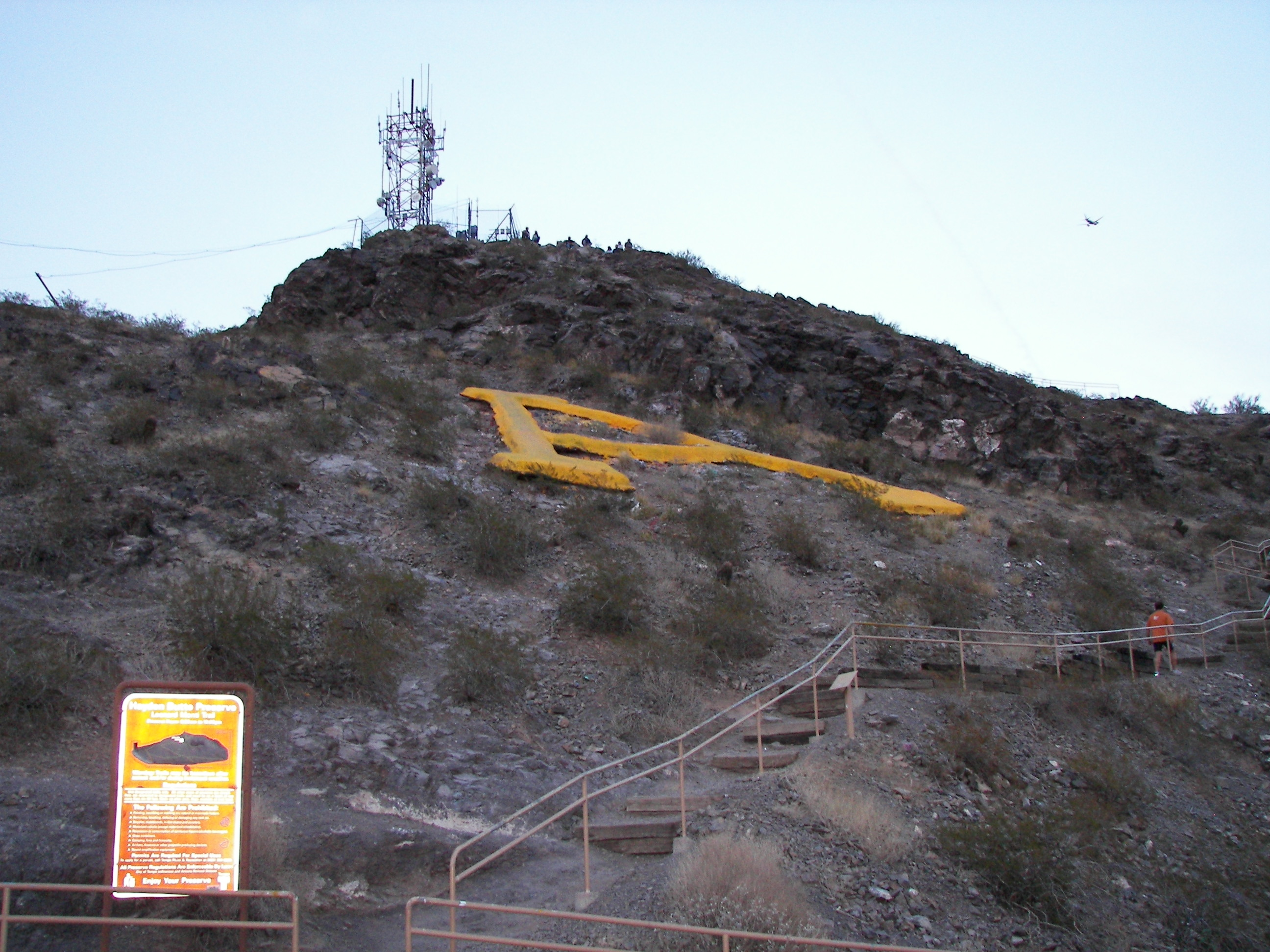
- Tempe Butte, or A Mountain, is a popular place to hike as it provides a view of ASU's Tempe campus and downtown Tempe.

Highest point
- Elevation: 1,495 ft (456 m) NAVD 88
- Prominence: 330 ft (100 m)
- Coordinates: 33°25′42″N 111°56′09″W

Geography
- Location within Arizona Location within the United States
- Location: Tempe; Maricopa County, Arizona, U.S.
- Topo map: USGS Tempe

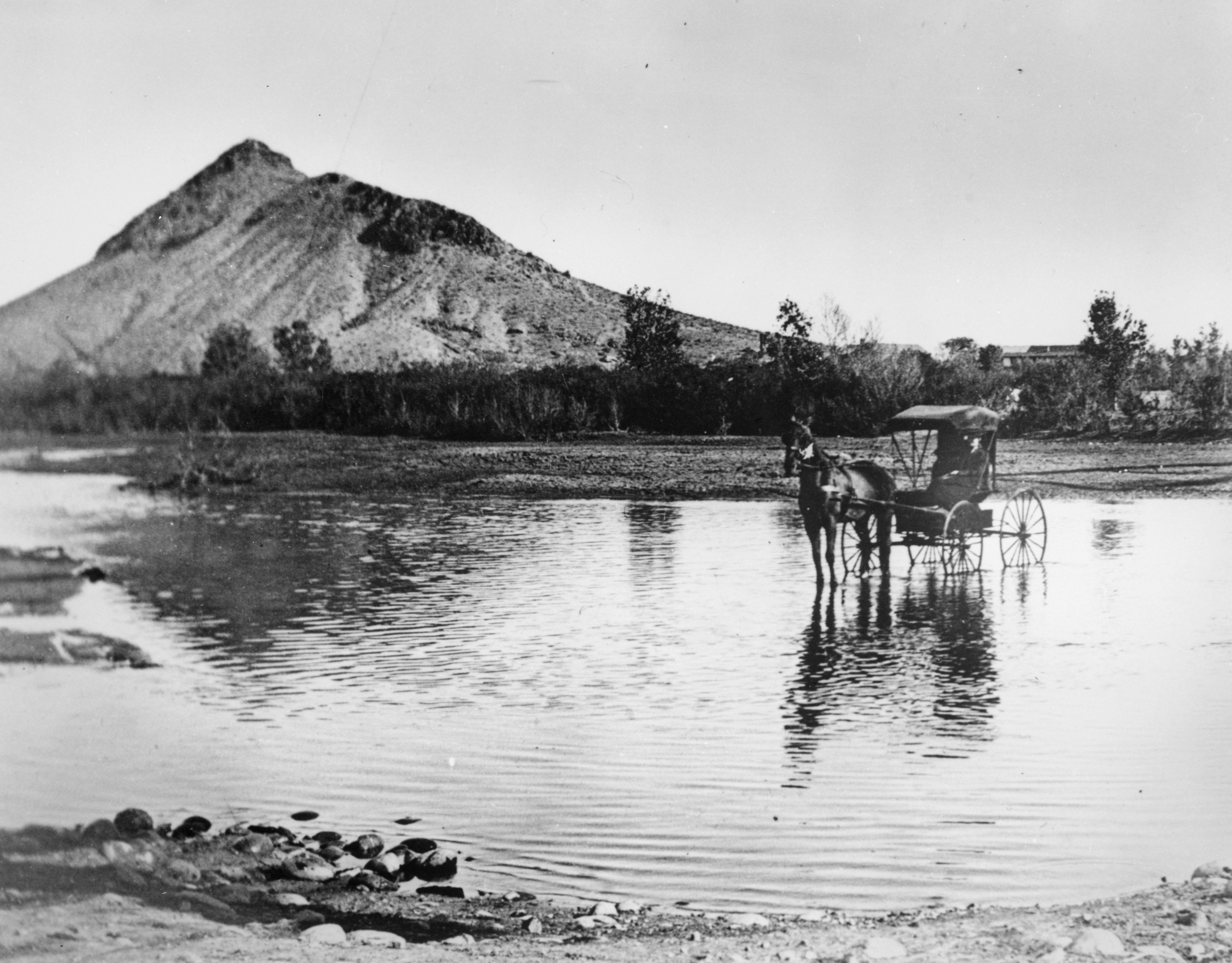
Tempe Butte c1870.

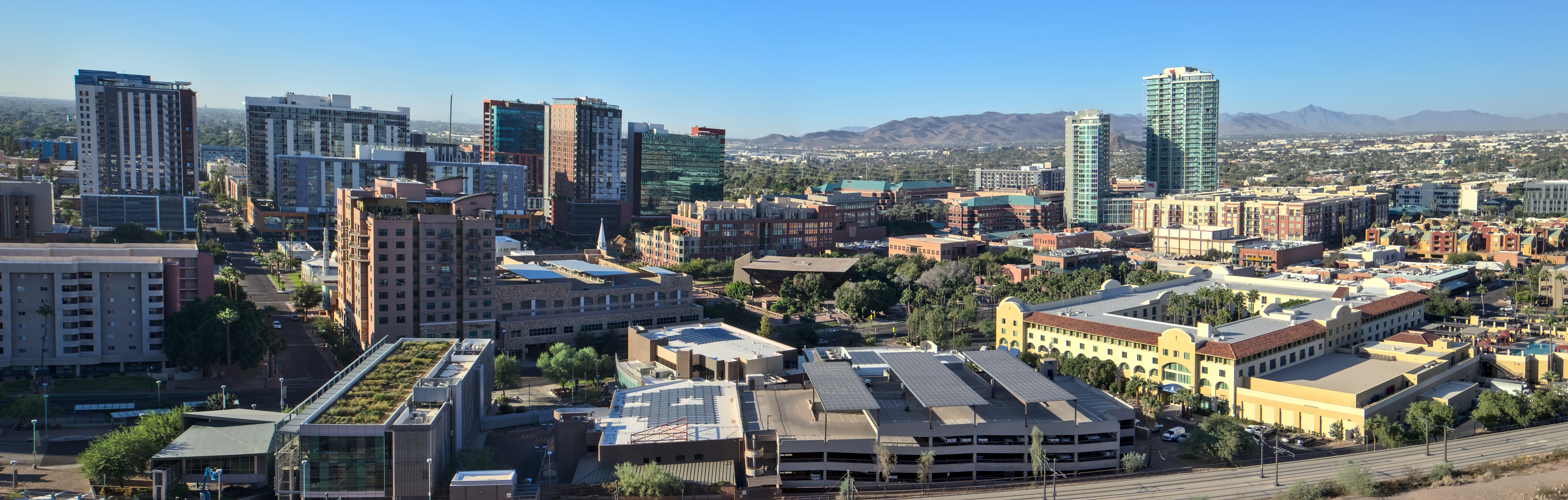
Looking down on downtown Tempe from the butte.

Tempe Butte (O'odham: ʼOidbaḍ Doʼag) is the official name of an andesite butte of volcanic origin, located partially on Arizona State University's Tempe campus in Tempe, Arizona. It is often referred to by locals as A Mountain, after the 60-foot-tall (18 m) gold-painted letter 'A' near the top. Another name for the area, used by the City of Tempe, is Hayden Butte.

The highest point of Tempe Butte stands at 1,495 feet (456 m) in elevation, while its base is at approximately 1,150 feet (350 m) in elevation.

Tempe Butte is most often seen as the backdrop to games held in Mountain America Stadium (historically Sun Devil Stadium).

== Geography ==
Originally, Tempe Butte was part of a series of horizontal layers, but the strata have been tilted, associated with the formation of South Mountain, and millennia of erosion has created the distinctive hogback of resistant andesite, over sedimentary deposits and rhyolite beds.

Despite intensive development, the butte and its immediate surroundings continue to support a variety of native vegetation, including saguaro, buckhorn cholla, barrel cactus, creosote bush, wolfberry, mormon tea, sweetbush, desert lavender, California buckwheat, catclaw acacia, palo verde and mesquite. Springtime annuals include Coulter's and Arizona lupine (Lupinus sparsiflorus and Lupinus arizonicus), Coulter's globemallow (Sphaeralcea coulteri), popcorn flowers (Cryptantha), fiddlenecks (Amsinckia), heliotropes (Phacelia), blonde plantain (Plantago ovata) and others. During the summer wild buckwheat (Eriogonum deflexum) blooms, leaving behind a "skeleton" in the fall. The five-winged spiderling (Boerhavia intermedia) then becomes the dominant annual on this preserve and in neighboring Tempe. Native wildlife include jackrabbits, and small desert-adapted species such as pack rats.

== History ==
Signs of early habitation by the Hohokam people have been found on Tempe Butte, including petroglyphs, pot shards, scrapers, and metate. "'Oidbaḍ Doʼag," the name used by the local Native Americans, means "Dead Field Mountain."

The area just west of the butte would be settled by the 1870s in an area first known as Hayden's Ferry, then a major crossing for the Salt River which flows just north of the butte. The proximity of the community to the butte prompted Darrell Duppa to fancifully compare the area to the Vale of Tempe near Mount Olympus in Greece; therefore, the town was given its present name. The remains of the Hayden Flour Mill (which lends its name to main thoroughfare Mill Avenue) still stand near the western edge of the butte.

More recent alterations include two water tanks on the south flank of the butte, and several trails, at least one paved, to provide access to man-made structures. The east side of the butte was partially excavated in order to accommodate the construction of Sun Devil Stadium in 1958. A 50-foot-tall (15 m) radio tower was built on the top of the mountain in 1962 for the Salt River Project.

In 1961, the City Council changed the mountain's name to "Hayden Butte," honoring early settler Charles T. Hayden (1825–1900) and his son, U.S. Senator Carl Hayden (1877–1972). The U.S. Geological Survey, however, continued to use the former name, "Tempe Butte."

In 1965, Arizona State University installed a concrete letter 'A' on the butte. The City of Tempe designated the area a "preserve" in 2002.

In May 2019 all towers and related materials were removed permanently by the city of Tempe. Recent development along the adjacent stretch of the Salt River (which has been dammed to form Tempe Town Lake) has prompted several grassroots movements to preserve the butte from further environmental damage.

== Capital "A" ==
Originally, the letter on Tempe Butte was an 'N', built by Tempe Normal School's class of 1918. The school changed its name to Tempe State Teacher's College in 1925, and the 'N' was adapted into a 'T'. Subsequently, three years later, the school would change its name again to Arizona State Teacher's College. It wasn't until 1938 that an “A” first appeared. It was formed from loose rocks and soon after, the fall ritual of whitewashing the "A" began. In 1952, vandals with dynamite completely destroyed the "A." The latest "A," made of reinforced steel and poured concrete, was built in 1955. It is 60 feet from its base to its top.

Due to the existence of an "A Mountain" for the University of Arizona (Sentinel Peak) which predates the "A" on Tempe Butte, students from these rival schools often attempt to paint the other's 'A' in their school colors. Guarding the A is an annual ritual in the week leading up to the annual ASU-UA football game, the Territorial Cup. The A has been painted in other colors for various causes, and is painted white at the beginning of each school year, but is usually painted Gold, one of ASU's school colors. Most recently, UA students painted the A red and blue in November 2014, three weeks prior to their rivalry game. The A has also been painted colors by other schools, such as green by Oregon Ducks fans and purple by Grand Canyon University fans.
