= McClintock/Apache Boulevard station =

Light rail station in Tempe, Arizona

McClintock Dr/Apache Blvd
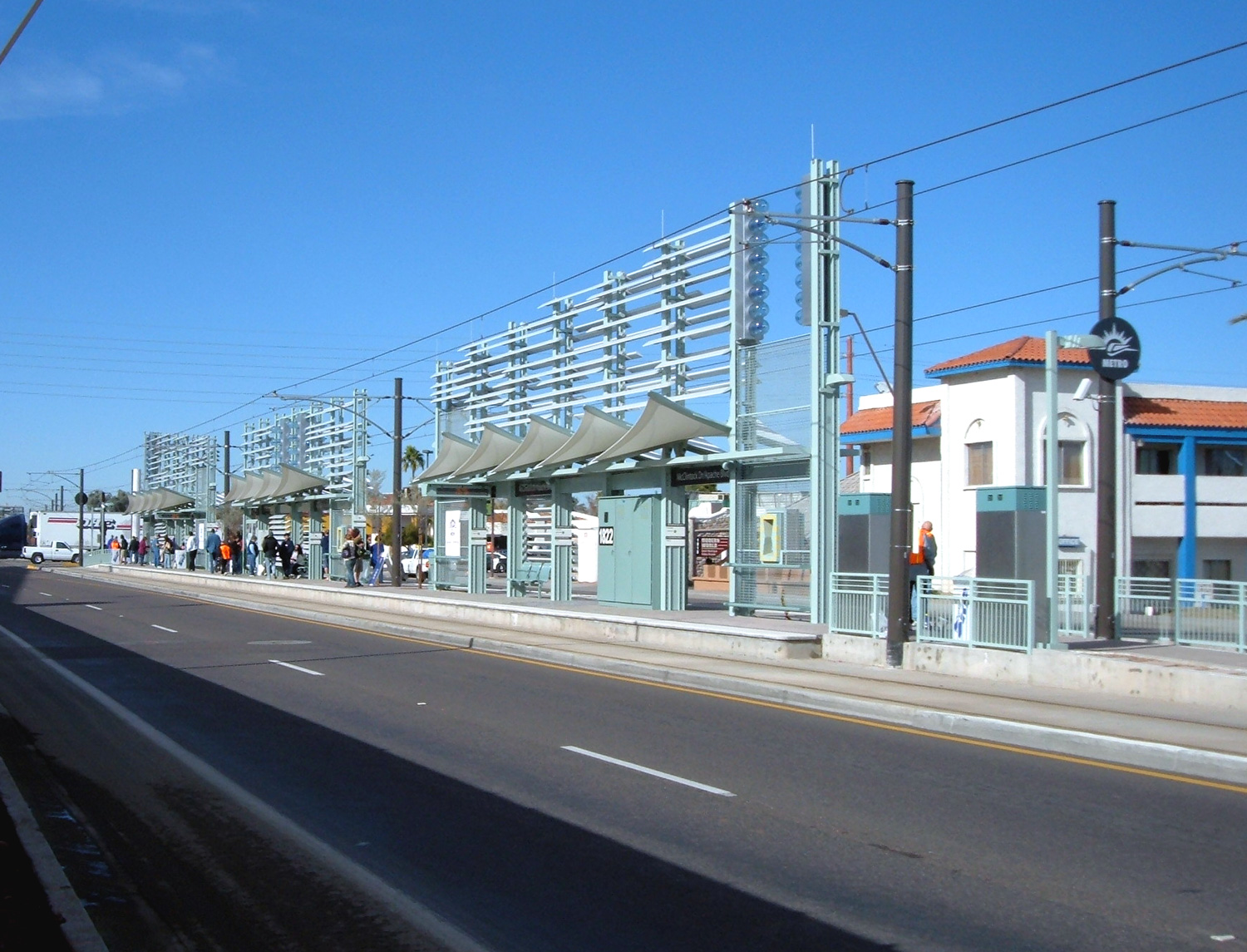
- The station during its first day of service on December 27, 2008

General information
- Location: Apache Boulevard and McClintock Drive, Tempe, Arizona; United States
- Coordinates: 33°24′53.25″N 111°54′30″W
- Owner: Valley Metro
- Operator: Valley Metro Rail & Streetcar
- Platforms: 1 island platform
- Tracks: 2
- Connections: Valley Metro Bus: 81

Construction
- Structure type: At-grade
- Parking: 300 spaces
- Cycle facilities: Yes
- Accessible: Yes

Other information
- Station code: 10025

History
- Opened: December 27, 2008

Services
Preceding station	Valley Metro	Following station
Dorsey/Apache Boulevard toward Downtown Phoenix Hub	A Line	Smith–Martin/Apache Boulevard toward Gilbert Road/Main Street
Location

McClintock/Apache Boulevard station is a station on the A Line of the Valley Metro Rail & Streetcar system in Tempe, Arizona, United States. It consists of one island platform in the median of Apache Boulevard, located on the east side of McClintock Drive. A park and ride facility is located in a parking garage attached to an apartment complex on the southeast corner of the station.

== Ridership ==
Weekday rail passengers
Year	In	Out	Average daily in	Average daily out
2009	278,721	263,577	1,097	1,038
2010	347,264	300,838	1,373	1,189

Valley Metro Bus	Route number	Route name	North/east end		South/west end			
Valley Metro Bus	81	McClintock Drive	Mustang Transit Center	Tempe Marketplace (select trips)	Chandler Fashion Center	ASU Research Park (select trips)	McClintock Drive/Campus Drive (select weekday trips)	Terminus (select weekday trips)
