= Price–101 Freeway/Apache Boulevard station =

Light rail station in Tempe, Arizona

Price–101/Apache Blvd
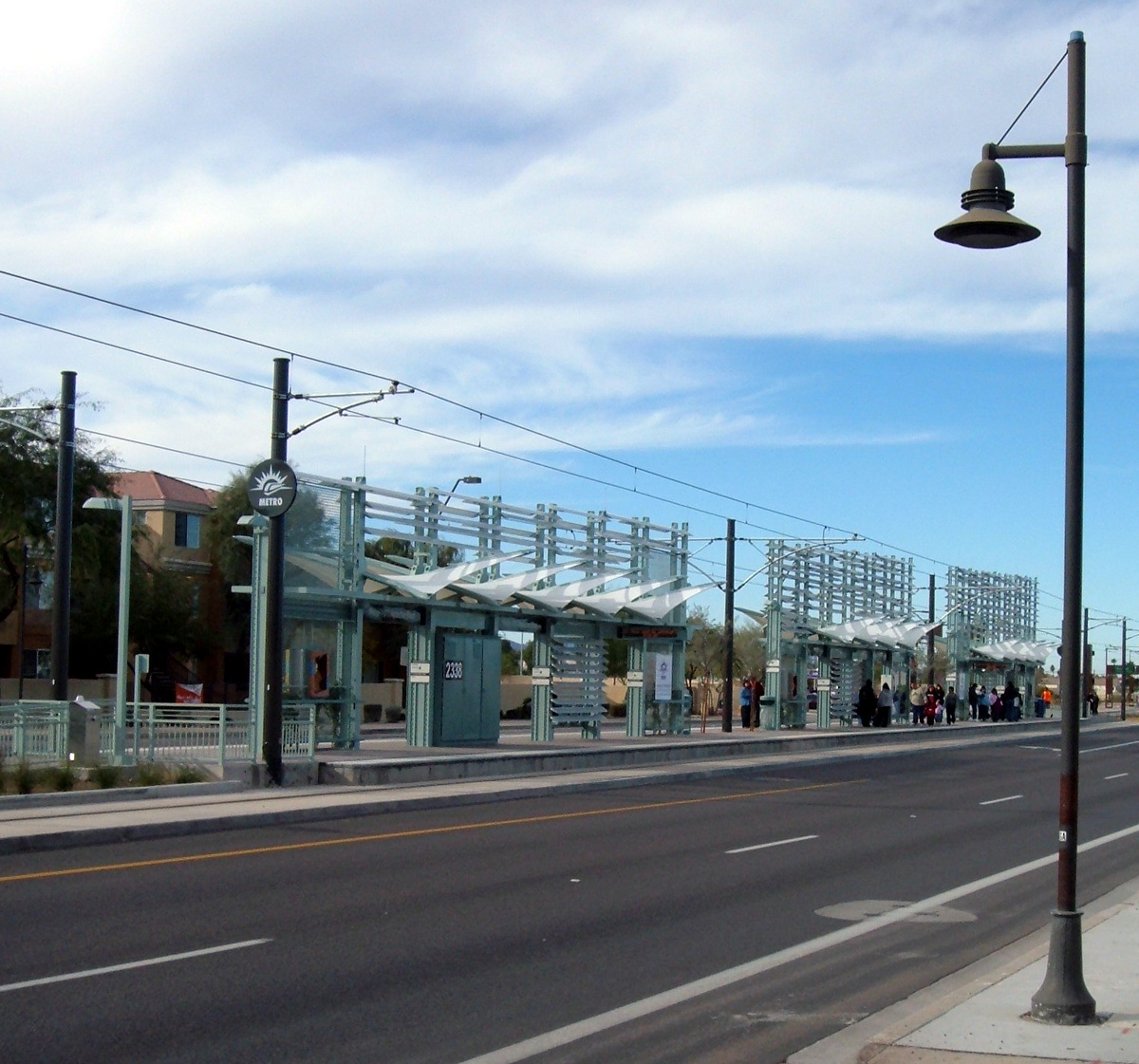
- The station on its first day of service, December 27, 2008

General information
- Location: Apache Boulevard and Price Road, Tempe, Arizona; United States
- Coordinates: 33°24′53.25″N 111°53′18″W
- Owner: Valley Metro
- Operator: Valley Metro Rail & Streetcar
- Platforms: 1 island platform
- Tracks: 2

Construction
- Structure type: At-grade
- Parking: 695 spaces
- Accessible: Yes

Other information
- Station code: 10027

History
- Opened: December 27, 2008

Services
Preceding station	Valley Metro	Following station
Smith–Martin/Apache Boulevard toward Downtown Phoenix Hub	A Line	Sycamore/Main Street toward Gilbert Road/Main Street
Location

Price–101 Freeway/Apache Boulevard station is a light rail station on the A Line of the Valley Metro Rail & Streetcar system in Tempe, Arizona, United States. It is the first station of the westbound line within the city of Tempe, and is located a few hundred feet east of Loop 101/Price Freeway. It consists of one island platform located in the median of Apache Boulevard to the east of the freeway. This station is a park and ride station.

== Ridership ==
Weekday rail passengers
Year	In	Out	Average daily in	Average daily out
2009	237,98	189,453	937	746
2010	308,445	280,561	1,219	1,109

== Notable places nearby ==
- Tempe Canal
