= 12th Street/Jefferson and 12th Street/Washington stations =

Pair of light rail stations in Phoenix, Arizona

12th St/Jefferson 12th St/Washington
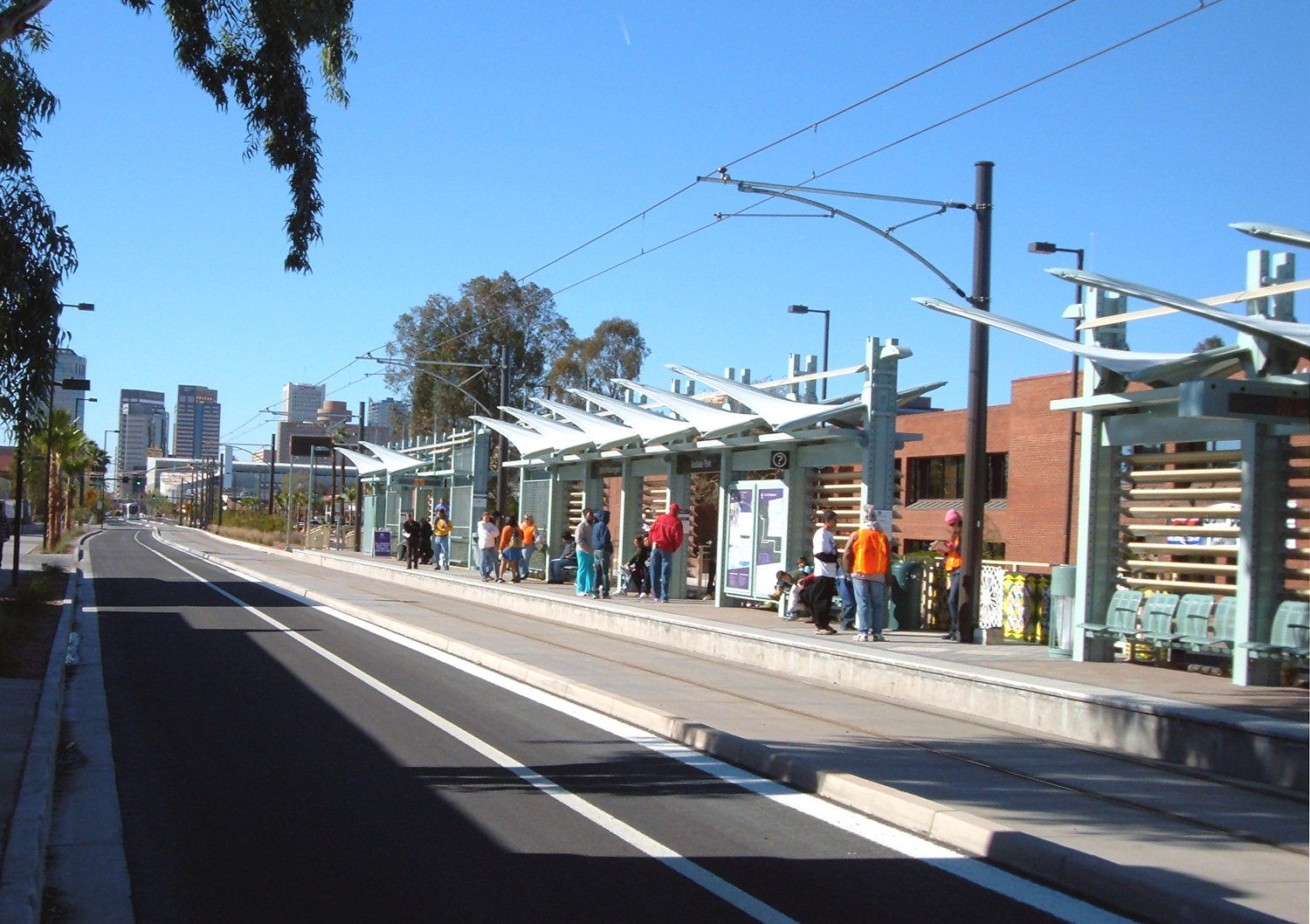
- 12th Street/Washington platform in December 2008

General information
- Other names: Eastlake Park
- Location: 12th Street and Jefferson Street; 12th Street and Washington Street, Phoenix, Arizona; United States
- Coordinates: 33°26′51.50″N 112°3′23.00″W
- Owner: Valley Metro
- Operator: Valley Metro Rail & Streetcar
- Platforms: 2 side platforms
- Tracks: 2
- Connections: Valley Metro Bus: 1, 12, South Mountain East RAPID

Construction
- Structure type: At-grade
- Accessible: Yes

Other information
- Station code: 10015, 10030

History
- Opened: December 27, 2008

Services
Preceding station	Valley Metro	Following station
12th Street/Washington
3rd Street/Washington toward Downtown Phoenix Hub	A Line	24th Street/Washington One-way operation
12th Street/Jefferson
3rd Street/Jefferson One-way operation	A Line	24th Street/Jefferson toward Gilbert Road/Main Street
Location

12th Street/Jefferson and 12th Street/Washington stations, also known as Eastlake Park, is a pair of light rail stations on the A Line of the Valley Metro Rail & Streetcar system in Phoenix, Arizona, United States. This station is split between two platforms, the westbound platform which is located on Washington Street at 12th Street and the eastbound platform located on Jefferson Street at 12th Street, approximately 500 feet (150 m) apart. Each station consists of one side platform.

== Ridership ==
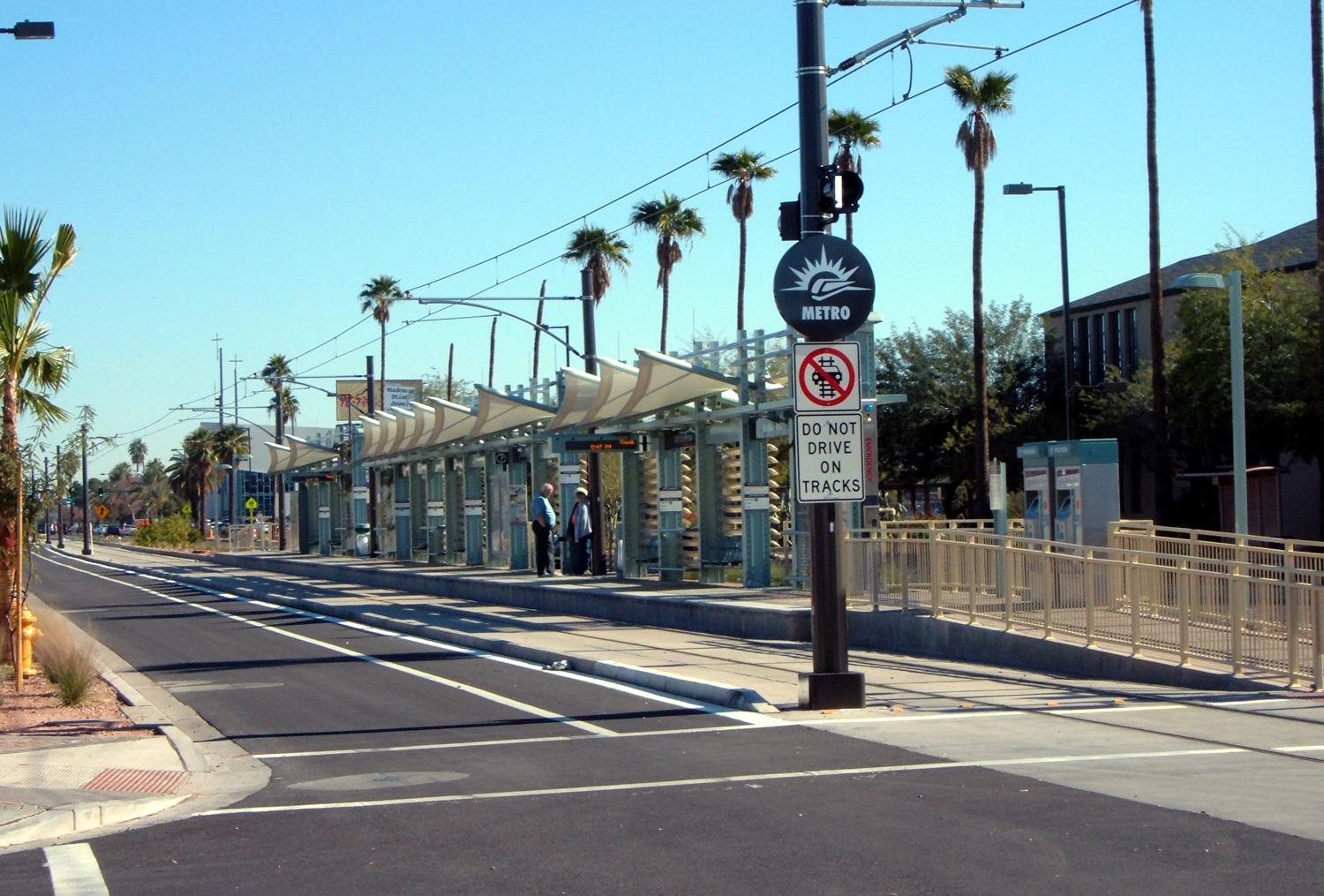
12th Street/Jefferson platform in December 2008

Weekday rail passengers
Year	In	Out	Average daily in	Average daily out
2009	126,286	128,444	497	506
2010	135,497	139,326	536	551

== Notable places nearby ==
- Eastlake Park
- Phoenix Fire Department Headquarters

== Connections ==
Valley Metro Bus	Route number	Route name	North/east end	South/west end
Valley Metro Bus	1	Washington Street	Priest Drive/Washington Street	Van Buren Street/Central Avenue/Polk Street
Valley Metro Bus	12	12th Street	Sunnyslope Transit Center	Terminus
Valley Metro Bus	SME	South Mountain East RAPID	Arizona State Capitol	24th Street/Baseline Road Park-and-Ride
