= 44th Street/Washington station =

Light rail and people mover station in Phoenix, Arizona

44th St/Washington PHX Sky Harbor Airport
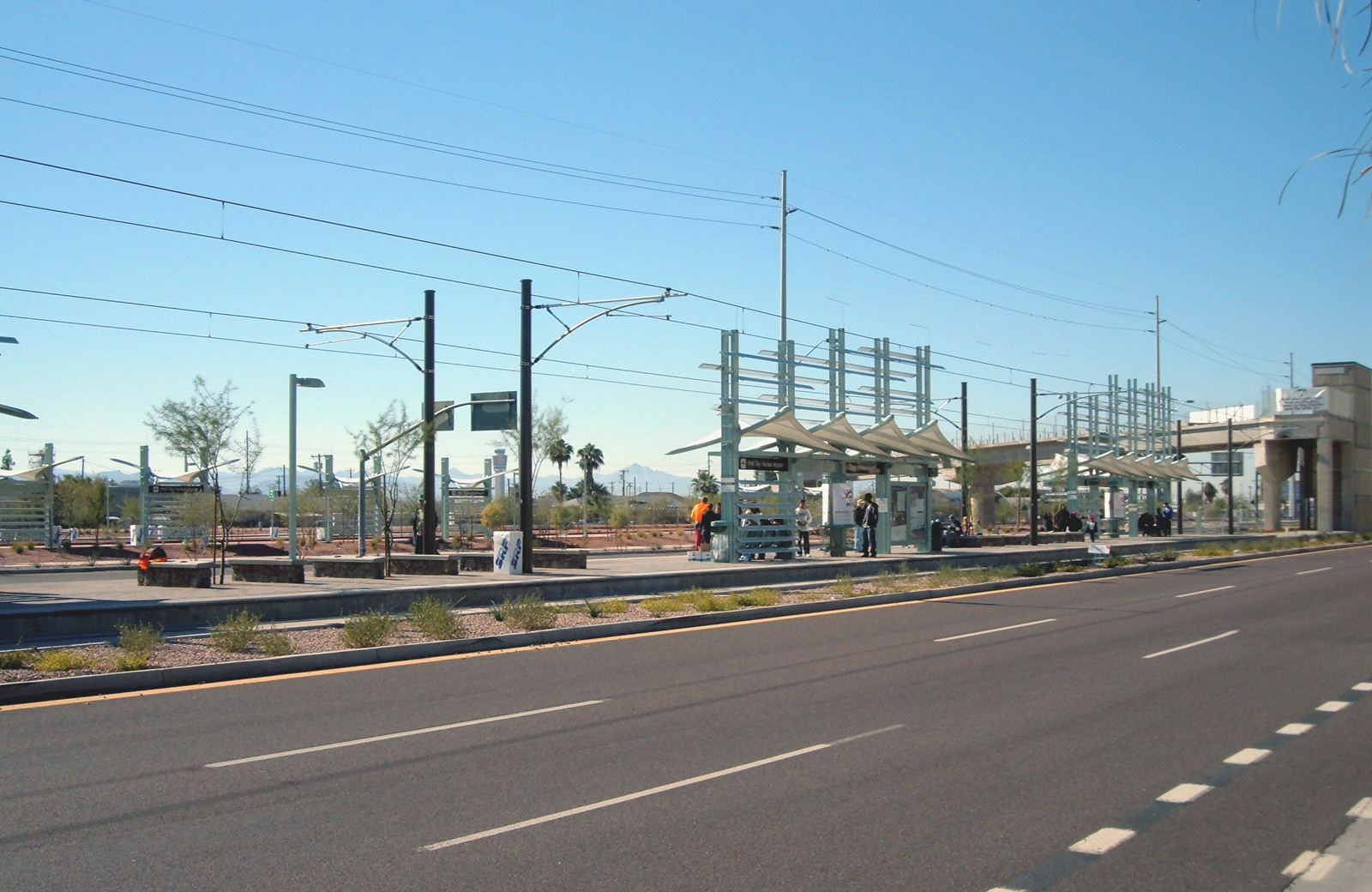
- The station in December 2008

General information
- Other names: PHX Sky Harbor Airport
- Location: 4299 East Washington Street; Phoenix, Arizona
- Coordinates: 33°26′54″N 111°59′18″W
- Owner: Valley Metro
- Operator: Valley Metro Rail & Streetcar
- Line: PHX Sky Train
- Platforms: 1 island platform
- Tracks: 2
- Connections: PHX Sky Train; Valley Metro Bus: 1, 32, 44; Greyhound Lines; Flixbus

Construction
- Structure type: At-grade
- Accessible: Yes

Other information
- Station code: 10018

History
- Opened: December 27, 2008

Services
Preceding station	Valley Metro	Following station
38th Street/Washington toward Downtown Phoenix Hub	A Line	50th Street/Washington toward Gilbert Road/Main Street
Preceding station	PHX Sky Train	Following station
East Economy Parking toward Rental Car Center	PHX Sky Train	Terminus
Location

44th Street/Washington station, also known as PHX Sky Harbor Airport, is a station on the A Line of the Valley Metro Rail & Streetcar system in Phoenix, Arizona, United States. It consists of one island platform in the median of Washington Street. The PHX Sky Train provides direct service from the light rail station to Phoenix Sky Harbor International Airport. This station is accessed from the light rail station via escalator and skyway; the Sky Train station consists of one elevated indoor island platform. Some early-morning and late-night trains start and end their service to and from the Downtown Phoenix Hub at this station, respectively.

In addition to Valley Metro Bus service, two other companies service the station. The Tucson-Phoenix-Flagstaff Flixbus line stops at the PHX Sky Train station. It is one of two stations for Flixbus service in the Phoenix area. Greyhound's Phoenix-Globe-El Paso bus line stops also stops at the station.

== Ridership ==
Weekday rail passengers
Year	In	Out	Average daily in	Average daily out
2009	443,792	470,007	1,747	1,850
2010	384,805	380,826	1,521	1,505

== Notable places nearby ==
- Crowne Plaza Phoenix Airport
- Corporate headquarters for Desert Financial Credit Union and Arizona Financial Credit Union
- Coutlier Center
- Phoenix Sky Harbor International Airport
- S'edav Va'aki

== Connections ==
Valley Metro Bus	Route number	Route name	North/east end			South/west end
Valley Metro Bus	1	Washington Street	Van Buren Street/Central Avenue/Polk Street			Priest Drive/Washington Street
Valley Metro Bus	32	32nd Street	28th Street/Camelback Road		Camelback High School (select weekday trips)	Baseline Road/40th Street
Valley Metro Bus	44	44th Street	Desert Ridge Marriott Resort	Paradise Valley Transit Center (select weekend trips)	44th Street/Camelback Road (select weekday trips)	Terminus
FlixBus	Route number	Route name	North/east end			South/west end
FlixBus	2040	Las Vegas-Phoenix-Tucson	Las Vegas Strip			University of Arizona
FlixBus	2042	Phoenix-Tucson	Terminus			Tucson (East) station
FlixBus	2047	Tucson-Phoenix-Flagstaff	Flagstaff station			University of Arizona
FlixBus	2054	Tucson-Phoenix-Los Angeles	University of Arizona			Los Angeles Union Station
Greyhound Lines	Route number	Route name	North/east end			South/west end
Greyhound Lines	US1030S	Phoenix-Globe-El Paso	El Paso Bus Station			Phoenix Bus Station
