= 38th Street/Washington station =

Light rail station in Phoenix, Arizona

38th St/Washington
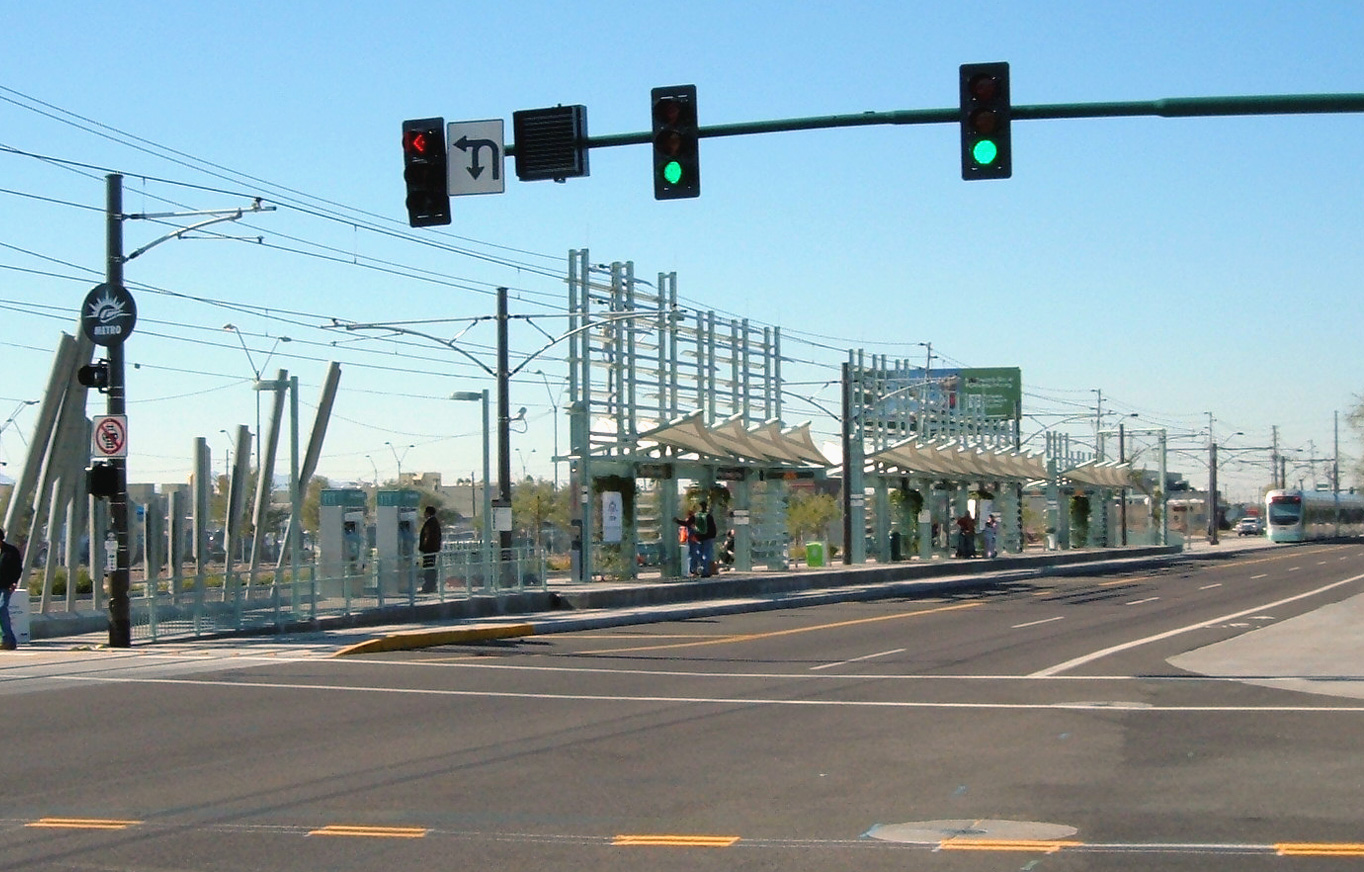
- The station in December 2008

General information
- Other names: GateWay Community College
- Location: Washington Street and 38th Street, Phoenix, Arizona; United States
- Coordinates: 33°26′53″N 112°0′0″W
- Owner: Valley Metro
- Operator: Valley Metro Rail & Streetcar
- Platforms: 1 island platform
- Tracks: 2
- Connections: Valley Metro Bus: 1, 32,

Construction
- Structure type: At-grade
- Parking: 189 spaces
- Accessible: Yes

Other information
- Station code: 10017

History
- Opened: December 27, 2008

Services
Preceding station	Valley Metro	Following station
24th Street/Washington toward Downtown Phoenix Hub	A Line	44th Street/Washington toward Gilbert Road/Main Street
24th Street/Jefferson One-way operation	A Line	44th Street/Washington toward Gilbert Road/Main Street
Location

38th Street/Washington station, also known as GateWay Community College, is a light rail station on the A Line of the Valley Metro Rail & Streetcar system in Phoenix, Arizona, United States. The station consists of one island platform in the median of Washington Street to the west of 38th Street. It is a park and ride station.

== Ridership ==
Weekday rail passengers
Year	In	Out	Average daily in	Average daily out
2009	71,660	72,731	282	286
2010	72,139	76,969	285	304

== Notable places nearby ==
- GateWay Community College Washington Campus
- Delaware North Phoenix Park 'n Swap (formerly Phoenix Greyhound Park)
- Phoenix Rising Soccer Stadium

== Connections ==
Valley Metro Bus	Route number	Route name	North/east end		South/west end
Valley Metro Bus	1	Washington Street	Van Buren Street/Central Avenue/Polk Street		Priest Drive/Washington Street
Valley Metro Bus	32	32nd Street	28th Street/Camelback Road	Camelback High School (select weekday trips)	Baseline Road/40th Street
