= 24th Street/Jefferson and 24th Street/Washington stations =

Pair of light rail stations in Phoenix, Arizona

24th St/Jefferson 24th St/Washington
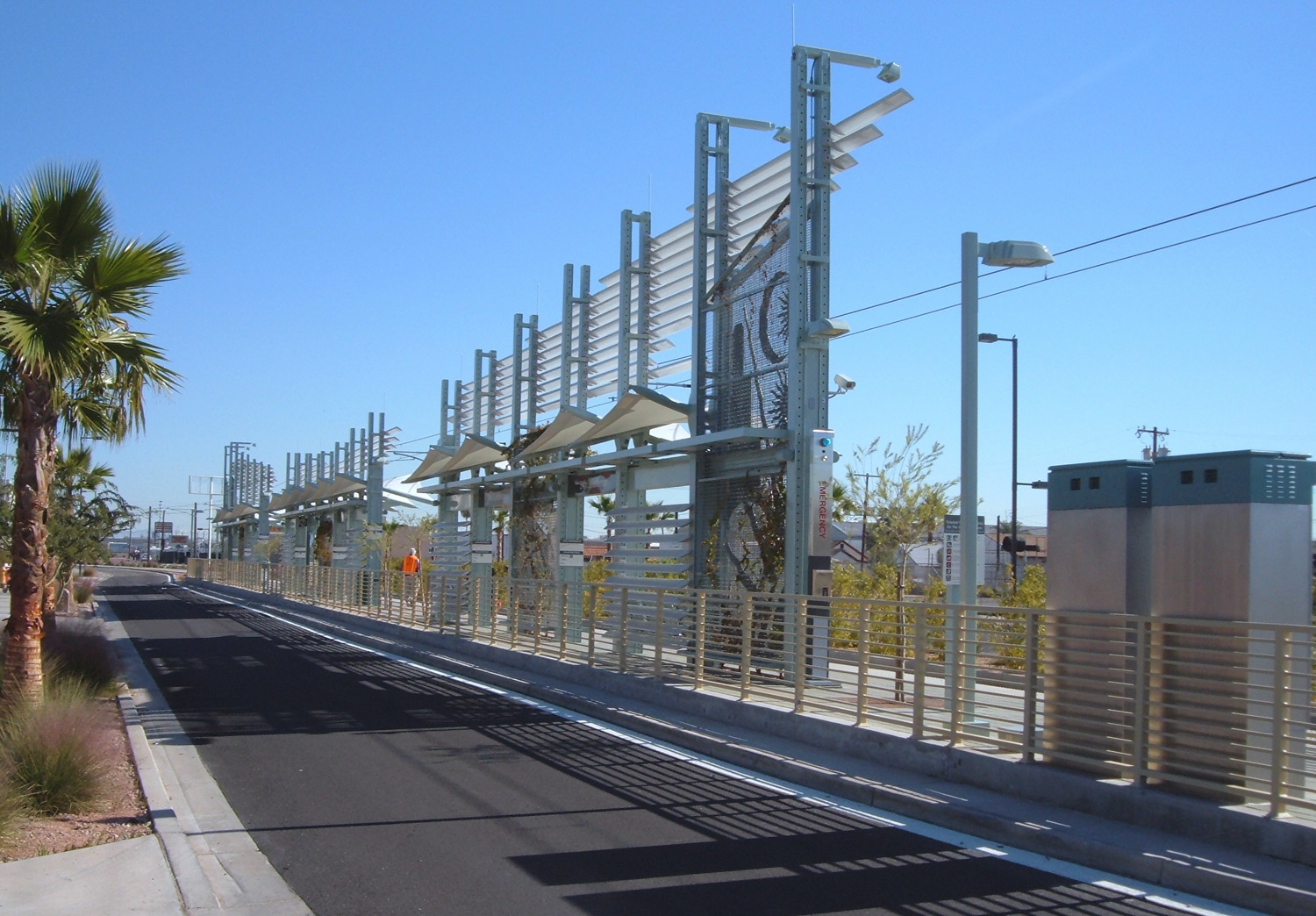
- 24th Street/Jefferson platform in December 2008

General information
- Location: 24th Street and Jefferson Street; 24th Street and Washington Street, Phoenix, Arizona; United States
- Coordinates: 33°26′52″N 112°1′46″W
- Owner: Valley Metro
- Operator: Valley Metro Rail & Streetcar
- Platforms: 2 side platforms
- Tracks: 2
- Connections: Valley Metro Bus: 1, 70

Construction
- Structure type: At-grade
- Accessible: Yes

Other information
- Station code: 10016, 10029

History
- Opened: December 27, 2008

Services
Preceding station	Valley Metro	Following station
24th Street/Washington
12th Street/Washington toward Downtown Phoenix Hub	A Line	38th Street/Washington One-way operation
24th Street/Jefferson
12th Street/Jefferson One-way operation	A Line	38th Street/Washington toward Gilbert Road/Main Street
Location

24th Street/Jefferson and 24th Street/Washington stations are a pair of light rail stations on the A Line of the Valley Metro Rail & Streetcar system in Phoenix, Arizona, United States. This station is split between two platforms, the westbound platform which is located on Washington Street at 24th Street and the eastbound platform located on Jefferson Street at 24th Street, approximately 400 feet (120 m) apart from one another. Each station consists of one side platform.

== Ridership ==
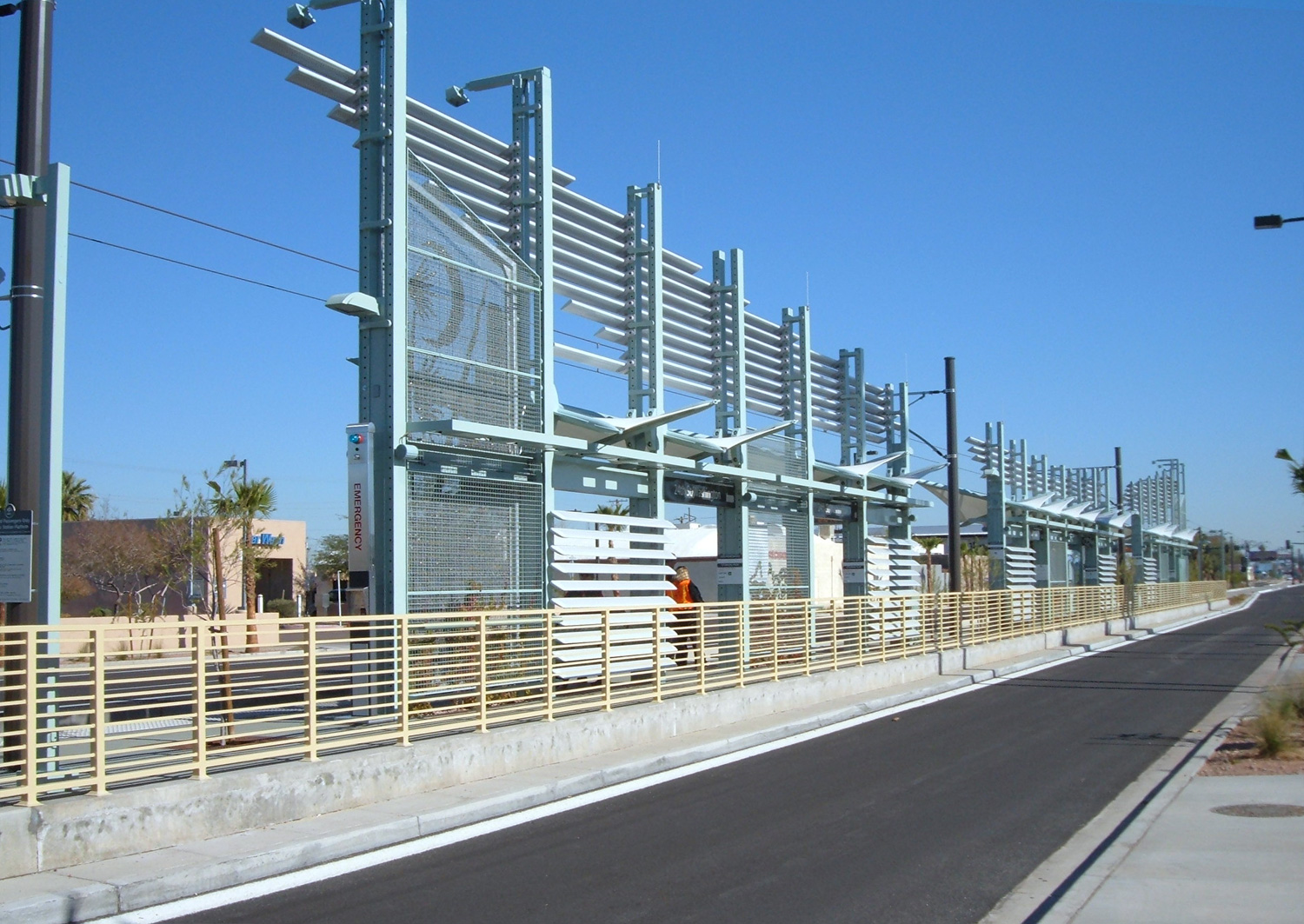
24th Street/Washington in December 2008

Weekday rail passengers
Year	In	Out	Average daily in	Average daily out
2009	162,174	162,988	638	642
2010	210,178	206,931	831	818

== Notable places nearby ==
- Greyhound bus terminal (3 blocks south)
- Valleywise Health
- Arizona State Hospital
- Phoenix Sky Harbor International Airport

== Connections ==
Valley Metro Bus	Route number	Route name	North/east end	South/west end					
Valley Metro Bus	1	Washington Street	Van Buren Street/Central Avenue/Polk Street	Priest Drive/Washington Street					
Valley Metro Bus	70	24th Street/Glendale Avenue	24th Street/Baseline Road Park-and-Ride	Luke Air Force Base Lightning Gate	99th Avenue/ Glendale Avenue Park-and-Ride (select weekday trips)	43rd Avenue/ Glendale Avenue	19th Avenue/ Glendale Avenue (select weekday trips)	24th Street/ Camelback Road (select weekend trips)	24th Street/ Van Buren Street (select weekday trips)
