= Smith–Martin/Apache Boulevard station =

Light rail station in Tempe, Arizona

Smith–Martin/Apache Blvd
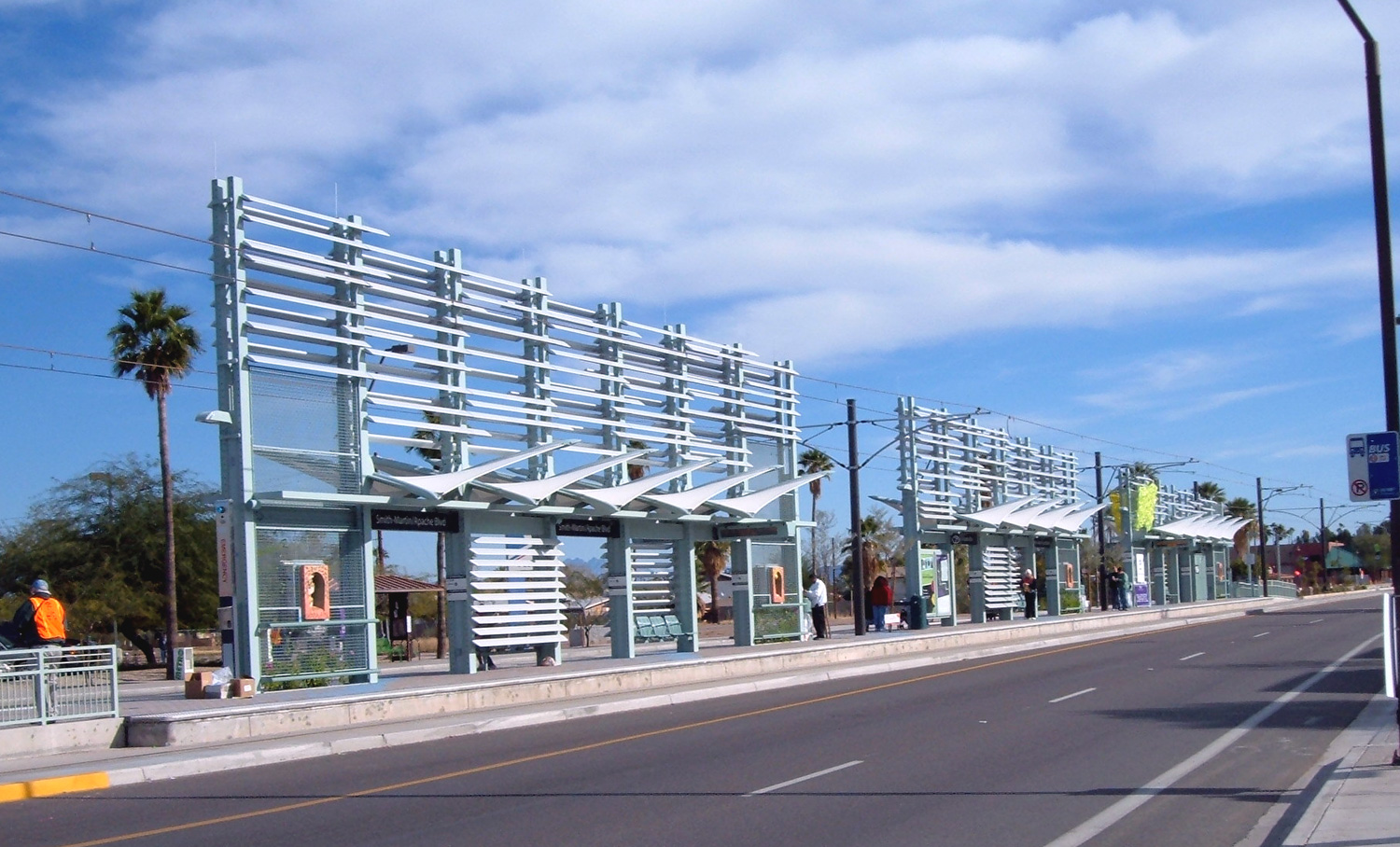
- The station during its first day of service on December 27, 2008

General information
- Location: Apache Boulevard and Martin Lane, Tempe, Arizona; United States
- Coordinates: 33°24′53.25″N 111°54′4″W
- Owner: Valley Metro
- Operator: Valley Metro Rail & Streetcar
- Platforms: 1 island platform
- Tracks: 2
- Connections: Valley Metro Bus: Tempe Orbit Mercury

Construction
- Structure type: At-grade
- Accessible: Yes

Other information
- Station code: 10026

History
- Opened: December 27, 2008

Services
Preceding station	Valley Metro	Following station
McClintock/Apache Boulevard toward Downtown Phoenix Hub	A Line	Price–101 Freeway/Apache Boulevard toward Gilbert Road/Main Street
Location

Smith–Martin/Apache Boulevard station is a station on the A Line of the Valley Metro Rail & Streetcar system in Tempe, Arizona, United States. The station is located on Apache Boulevard, between Smith Road (which travels north from the station) and Martin Lane (which travels south). The station has one island platform in the median of Apache Boulevard.

== Notable places nearby ==
- Tempe-Apache Post Office
- Culdesac Tempe

== Ridership ==
Weekday rail passengers
Year	In	Out	Average daily in	Average daily out
2009	88,703	75,791	349	298
2010	94,262	113,732	373	450

== Connections ==
Valley Metro Bus	Route number	Route name	North/east end	South/west end
Valley Metro Bus	MERC	Tempe Orbit Mercury	Escalante Center	Tempe Transportation Center
