= 3rd Street/Jefferson and 3rd Street/Washington stations =

Pair of light rail stations in Phoenix, Arizona

3rd St/Jefferson 3rd St/Washington
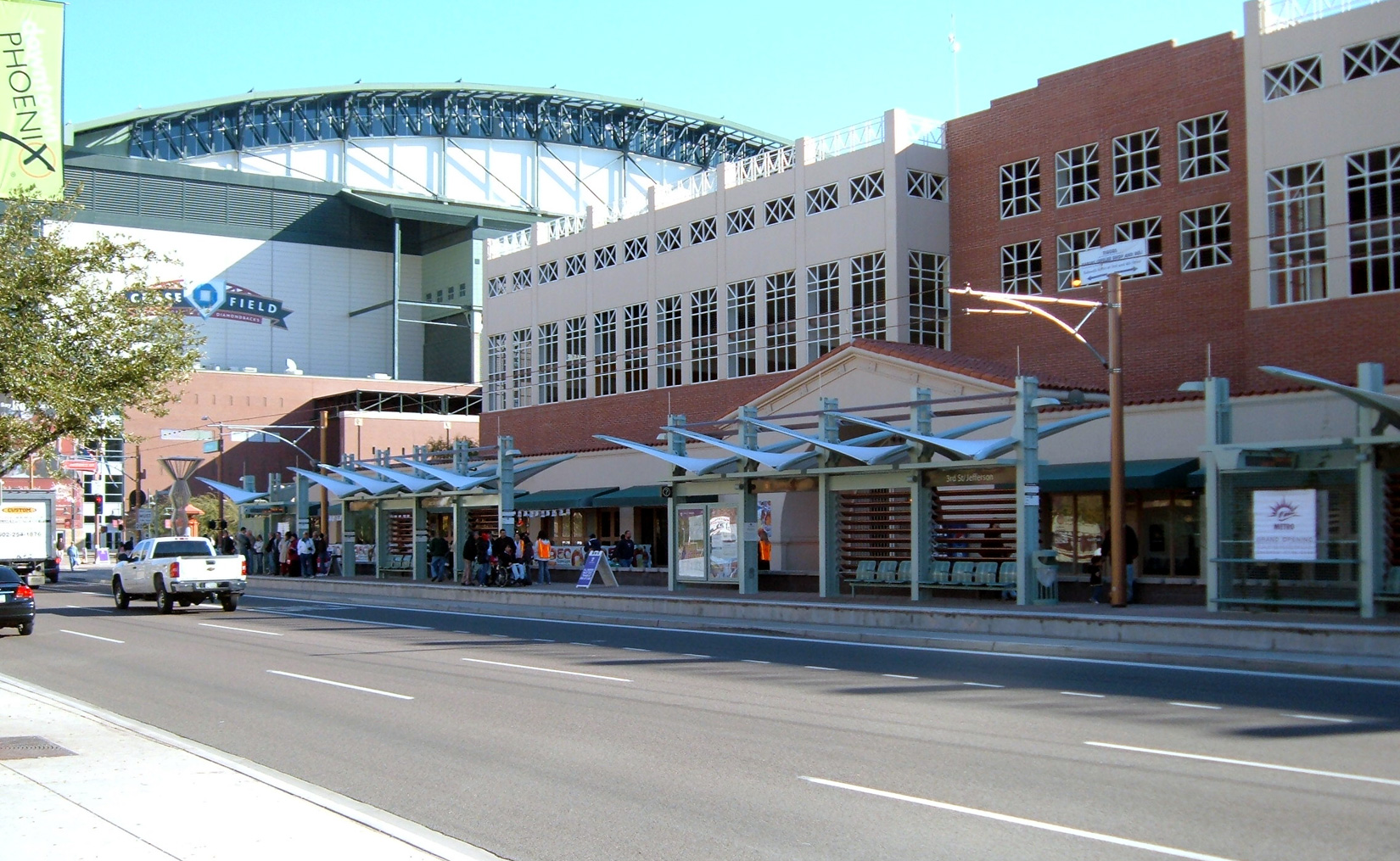
- 3rd Street/Jefferson platform in December 2008

General information
- Other names: BallPark/Arena; Convention Center
- Location: 3rd Street and Jefferson Street; 3rd Street and Washington Street, Phoenix, Arizona; United States
- Coordinates: 33°26′50″N 112°4′11.75″W
- Owner: Valley Metro
- Operator: Valley Metro Rail & Streetcar
- Platforms: 2 side platforms
- Tracks: 2

Construction
- Structure type: At-grade
- Accessible: Yes

Other information
- Station code: 10014, 10031

History
- Opened: December 27, 2008

Services
Preceding station	Valley Metro	Following station
3rd Street/Washington
Downtown Phoenix Hub Terminus	A Line	12th Street/Washington One-way operation
3rd Street/Jefferson
Downtown Phoenix Hub One-way operation	A Line	12th Street/Jefferson toward Gilbert Road/Main Street
Location

3rd Street/Jefferson and 3rd Street/Washington stations, each also known as BallPark/Arena and Convention Center respectively, are a pair of light rail stations on the A Line of the Valley Metro Rail & Streetcar system in Phoenix, Arizona, United States. The station has two platforms, the westbound platform which is located on 3rd Street and Washington Street, and the eastbound platform on 3rd Street and Jefferson Street, approximately 500 feet (150 m) apart. Each station consists of one side platform.

== Ridership ==
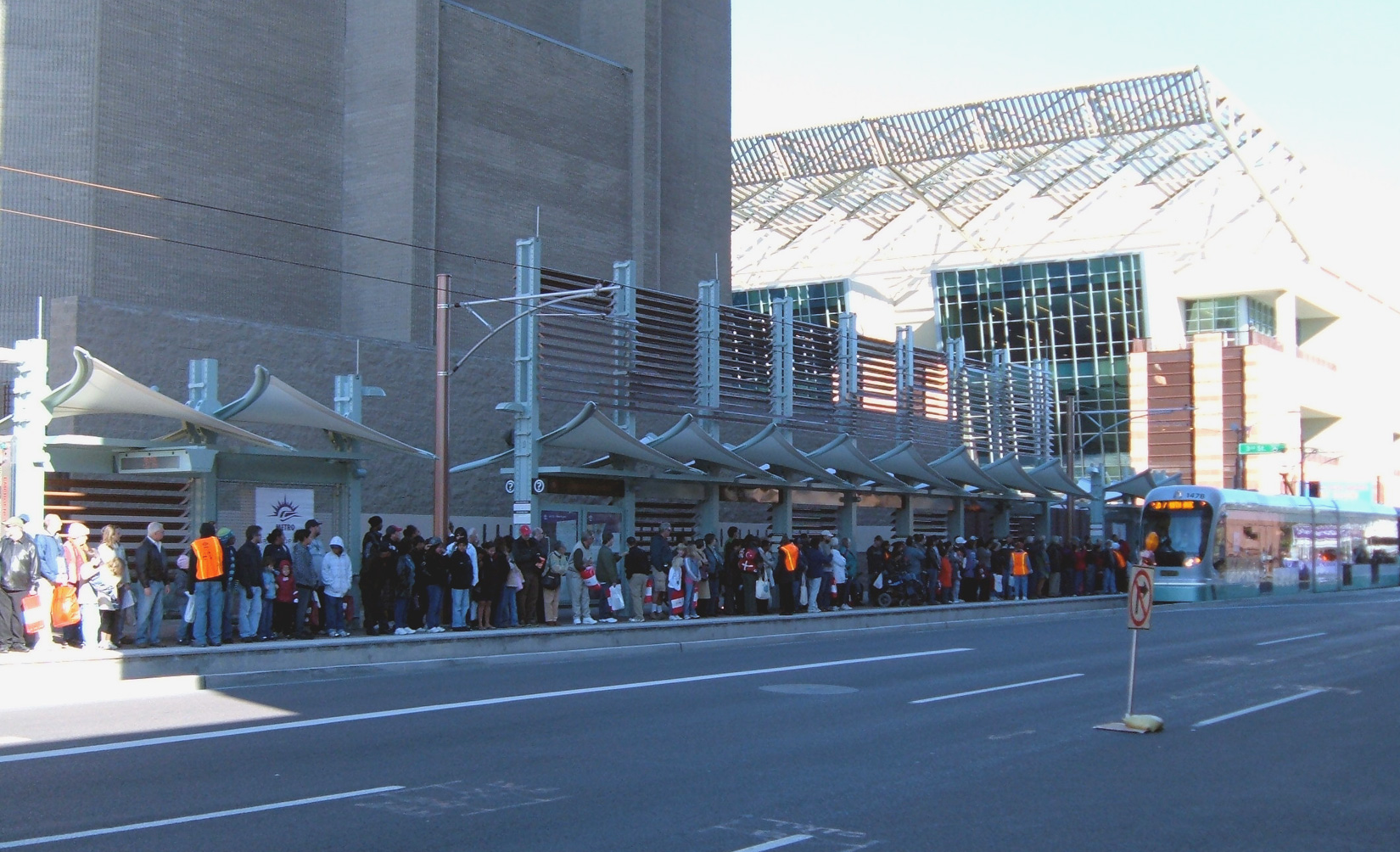
3rd Street/Washington platform in December 2008

Weekday rail passengers
Year	In	Out	Average daily in	Average daily out
2009	396,088	401,273	1,559	1,580
2010	360,670	364,081	1,426	1,439

== Nearby attractions ==
- Phoenix Convention Center
- Phoenix Symphony Hall
- Bank of America Tower
- Mortgage Matchup Center
- Chase Field
- Sandra Day O'Connor United States Courthouse
- Arizona Science Center
- Heritage Square
