= Phoenix Symphony Hall =

Performing arts venue

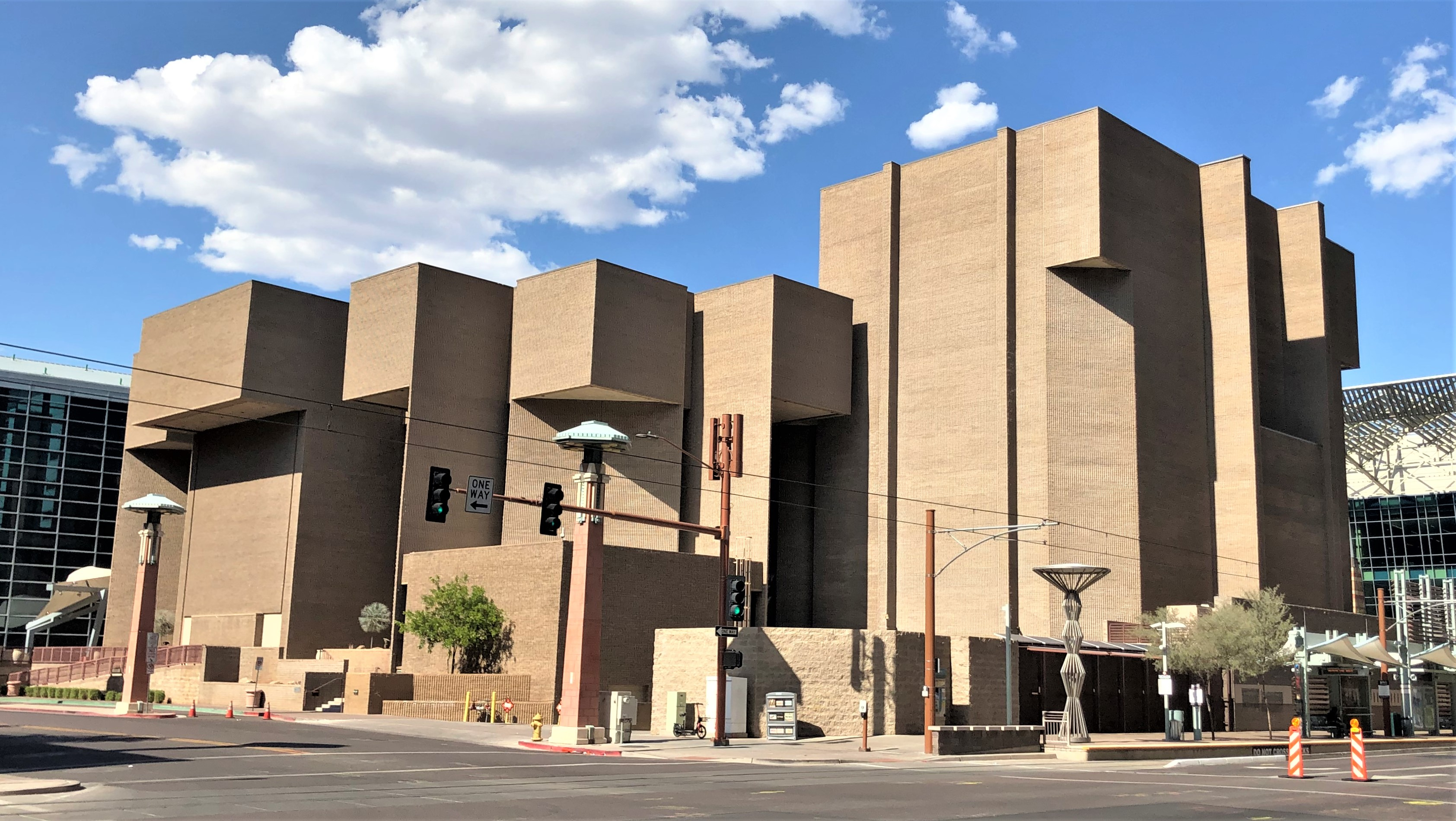
- (2021)
- Interactive map of Phoenix Symphony Hall
- Address: 75 North Second Street; Phoenix, Arizona 85004; United States
- Location: Downtown Phoenix
- Coordinates: 33°26′55.90″N 112°4′13.89″W
- Owner: City of Phoenix, Phoenix Convention Center and Venues Department
- Seating type: Reserved
- Capacity: 2,312
- Type: Concert Hall
- Public transit: 3rd Street/Jefferson (eastbound); 3rd Street/Washington (westbound)

Construction
- Groundbreaking: 1969
- Opened: 1972
- Renovated: 2004
- Architect: Charles Luckman
- General contractor: Del E. Webb Construction Company

Website
- Venue website

Symphony Hall is a multi-purpose performing arts venue, located at 75 North 2nd Street between North 3rd Street and East Washington Street in downtown Phoenix, Arizona. Part of Phoenix Civic Plaza, the hall is bounded to the north by the West Building of the Phoenix Convention Center. The Hall is the home of the Phoenix Symphony, Arizona Opera, and Ballet Arizona, and the site of numerous other performances. It was built from 1969 to 1972 and was designed by Charles Luckman in the Brutalist style. The Hall was renovated in 2004.

== History ==
Symphony Hall was completed in 1972, as part of the Phoenix Civic Plaza, and quickly became the home of the People's Pops Concert founded in 1970 by Theresa Elizabeth Perez, Music Coordinator for the City of Phoenix (1969–1983), which has been performed at Phoenix College. Theresa's Children's Opera Series (Help, Help, the Globolinks! Noye's Fludde, and Beauty is Fled) were also presented at Symphony Hall.

As well as being the home of the Phoenix Symphony, Arizona Opera and Ballet Arizona, it is also the site for Broadway touring companies, a variety of dance productions, and appearances by popular entertainers, as well as the location for business seminars, and convention general sessions.

In June 2004, a $18.5 million renovation took place, in conjunction with the construction of the neighboring Phoenix Convention Center West Building.

Symphony Hall now features 2,312 seats, with wood bases for better acoustics. Reconfigured main-floor cross aisles, additional elevators and a new wheelchair seating section, greatly improve accessibility for patrons with disabilities and updates compliance with the Americans with Disabilities Act. There is a 60-foot × 100-foot (18.29m × 30.48m) stage area, high technology acoustical, lighting, rigging and sound systems, a Green Room, rehearsal hall and star, chorus and musicians dressing rooms.

It has been designated as a Phoenix Point of Pride.

== Transportation ==
Symphony Hall is served by the 3rd Street/Jefferson and 3rd Street/Washington stop on the A Line. (Signs at the station denote that station as Convention Center but Valley Metro Rail & Streetcar maps only use the street intersection names.)

== In popular culture ==
Phoenix Symphony Hall appears in the Clint Eastwood film The Gauntlet (1977), where it is used as the exterior of "Phoenix City Hall." Eastwood's bus crashes onto the steps of Symphony Hall at the climax of the movie. John Stewart's live album, The Phoenix Concerts, was recorded there.

== See also ==
- List of historic properties in Phoenix, Arizona
