= Phoenix Metro =

Phoenix Metro may refer to:

- Phoenix metropolitan area, the metropolitan area surrounding and including Phoenix, Arizona
- Valley Metro, the public transit system serving Phoenix, Arizona
  - Valley Metro Rail, the light rail system operated by Valley Metro
