= Phoenix Convention Center =

Events venue in Arizona

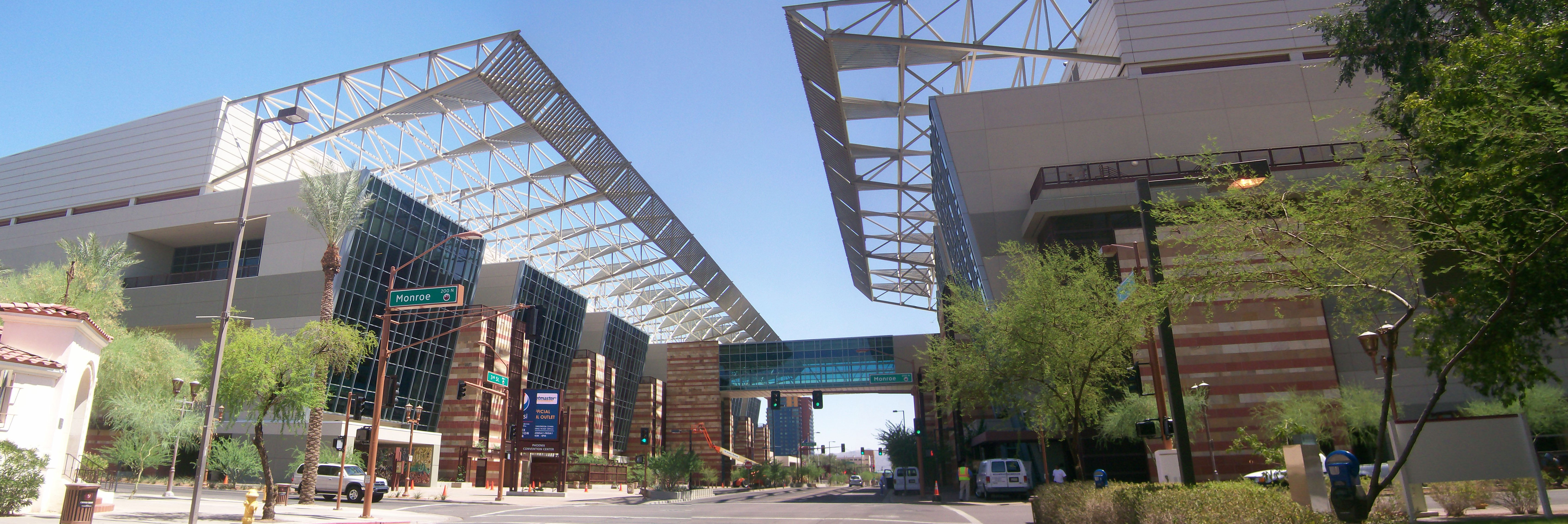
- The convention center's exterior in July 2009
- Interactive map of Phoenix Convention Center
- Former names: Phoenix Civic Plaza
- Location: 100 N. 3rd St., Phoenix, Arizona, U.S.
- Coordinates: 33°26′57.65″N 112°4′9.10″W
- Public transit: 3rd Street/Jefferson (eastbound); 3rd Street/Washington (westbound)

Construction
- Built: 1969–1972
- Opened: September 28, 1972
- Renovated: 2008 (South building)
- Expanded: 1982 (South building); 2005–2008 (North and West buildings)
- Demolished: 2006 (original North building)
- Architects: Charles Luckman Associates (1972); Populous/ Leo A. Daly (2006–2008)

The Phoenix Convention Center, formerly the Phoenix Civic Plaza, is an events venue in downtown Phoenix, Arizona. The center opened in 1972, and has since hosted national and regional conventions, trade shows, consumer events, musical concerts and theatrical productions.

The convention center has three buildings; its North and West buildings are connected underground by a shared exhibit hall and by a skyway bridge over Third Street, and its South building is a stand-alone facility. The center's Third Street Canyon between its North and West buildings is sometimes used as outdoor event space.

== History ==
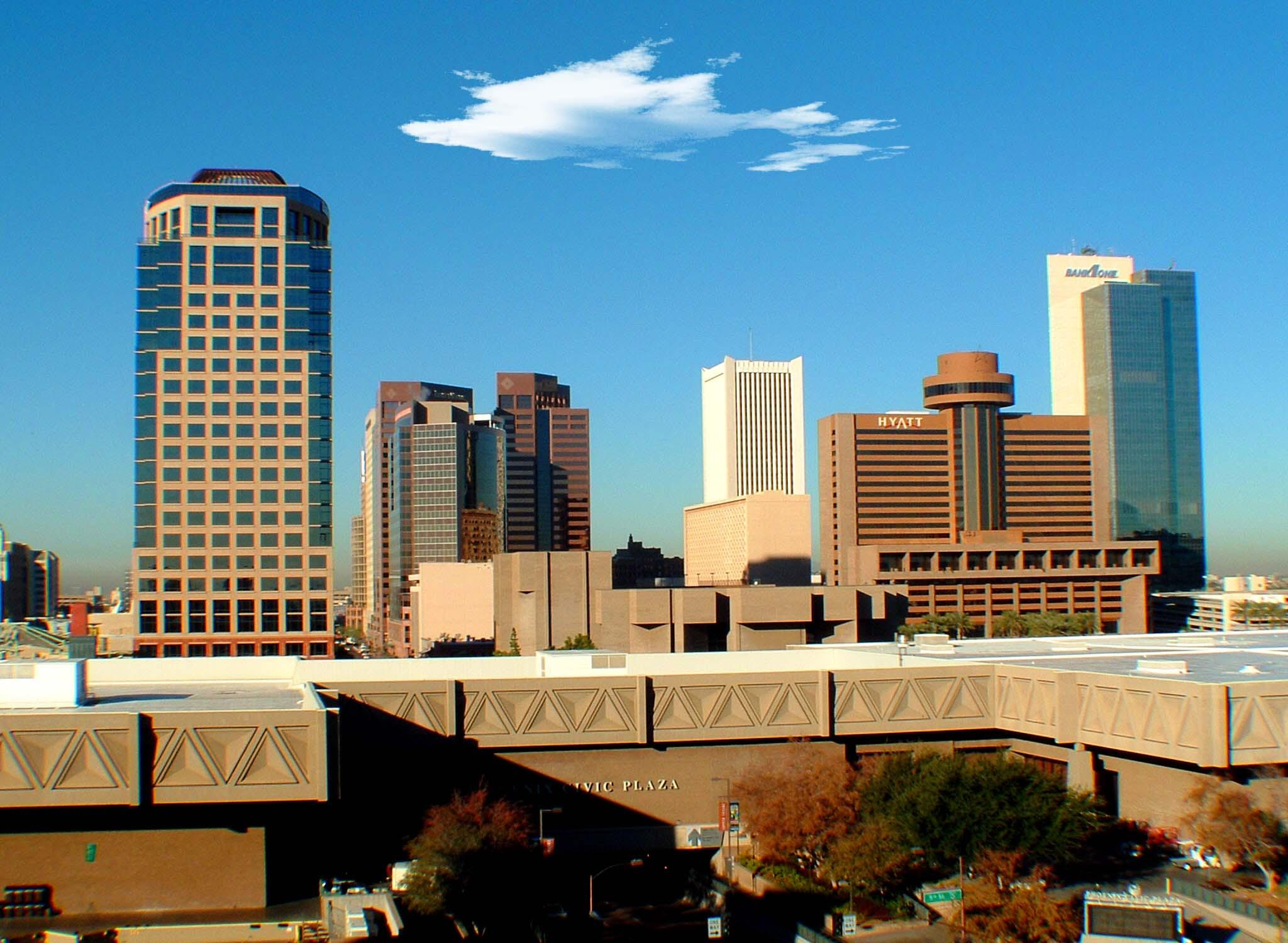
The Phoenix Civic Plaza in 2004 (bottom of picture), showing the South building and former North building and skyway over Washington Street

The concept for a performing arts auditorium developed as early as 1959. At that time, cultural and theatrical events were being held in outdated high school auditoriums. It was determined that the Phoenix metropolitan area would benefit, not only from having an entertainment facility, but also from a facility that could accommodate regional and national convention business.

A citizens group was formed in the early 1960s to study the development of a convention center and the idea for Phoenix Civic Plaza became reality. In 1963, in order to finance construction, the non-profit Phoenix Civic Plaza Building Corporation was created. On April 15, 1969, the city of Phoenix and Phoenix Civic Plaza Building Corporation signed legal agreements for the initial construction of the convention center.

The Phoenix Civic Plaza Department was created in November 1969, to oversee the operational aspects of the construction, purchase equipment and hire and train staff. Construction of Phoenix Civic Plaza began July 8 of that same year and was completed in 1972 at a cost of $28 million and occupying 16.5 acres (67,000 m^{2}). The original project included Phoenix Symphony Hall, which opened at the same time. The plans were drawn up by Charles Luckman Associates in a Brutalist style. Del E. Webb Corporation was awarded the construction contract to build the Civic Plaza. A formal dedication ceremony was held on September 28, 1972.

Six years later, the demand for additional space created a need for expansion. During that time, several conventions were bumped because of previous commitments and conflicting dates. When construction was completed in 1985, Phoenix Civic Plaza had more than doubled its available space to over 300,000 square feet (28,000 m^{2}).

In the mid-1990s, Phoenix Convention Center embarked on a $32 million renovation project to update and enhance its image and keep the facility competitive for convention and trade show business.

== Expansion ==
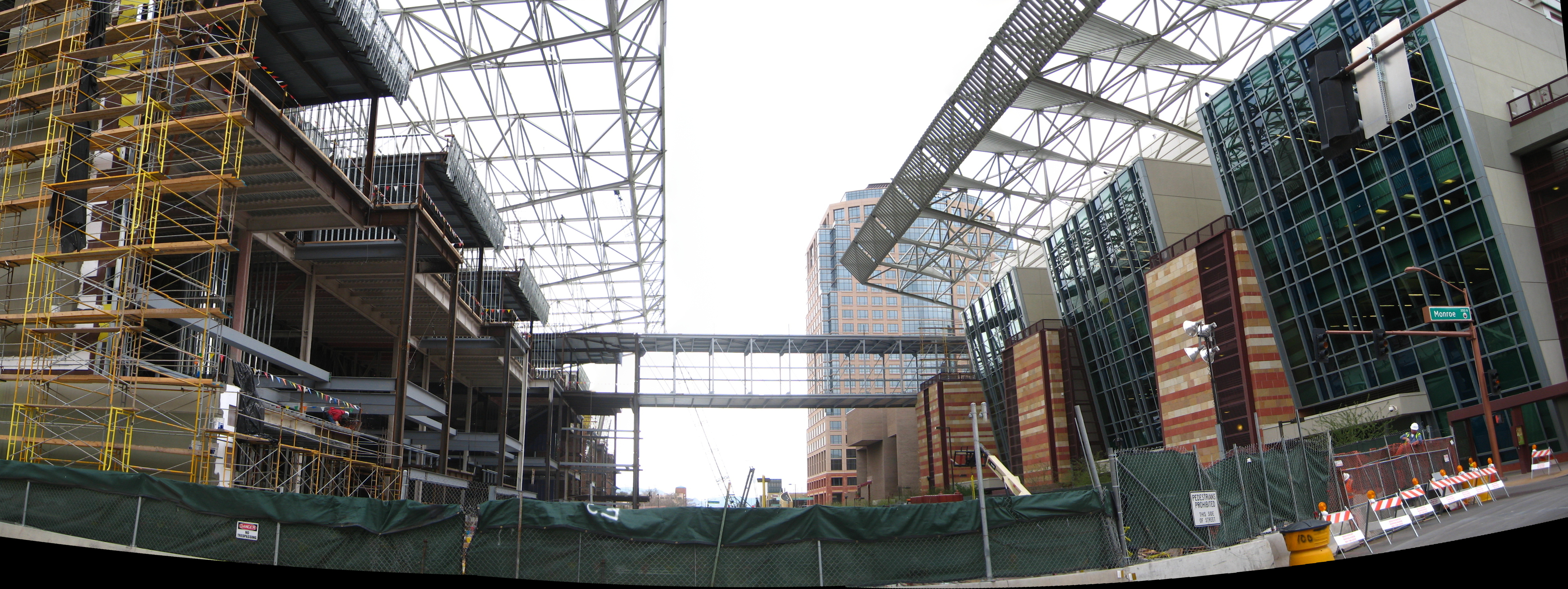
Construction of the new wing (left) adjacent to the existing West building of the Convention Center (right)

A multi-phased $600 million expansion project has nearly tripled the size of the Phoenix Convention Center, making it one of the top 20 convention venues in North America. Phase I opened in 2006, with Populous as the design architect and Leo A. Daly as the prime and managing architect. Populous served as both design architect and architect of record for Phase II of the expansion, which saw the demolition of the 1972 structure and erection of a new structure in its place. It was completed in 2008. Phase III, which will replace the South building, was approved by the Phoenix City Council in 2023 but is not currently scheduled.

The design of the new convention center aims to reference the unique Arizona landscape. Steel canopies extend over third Street to create shade. The large glass and stone atrium in the West Building represents the unique angles and light of an Arizona slot canyon. Colors, textures and finishes capture the warm hues of the Sonoran Desert and the cool tones of an Arizona desert sky.

== Facilities ==
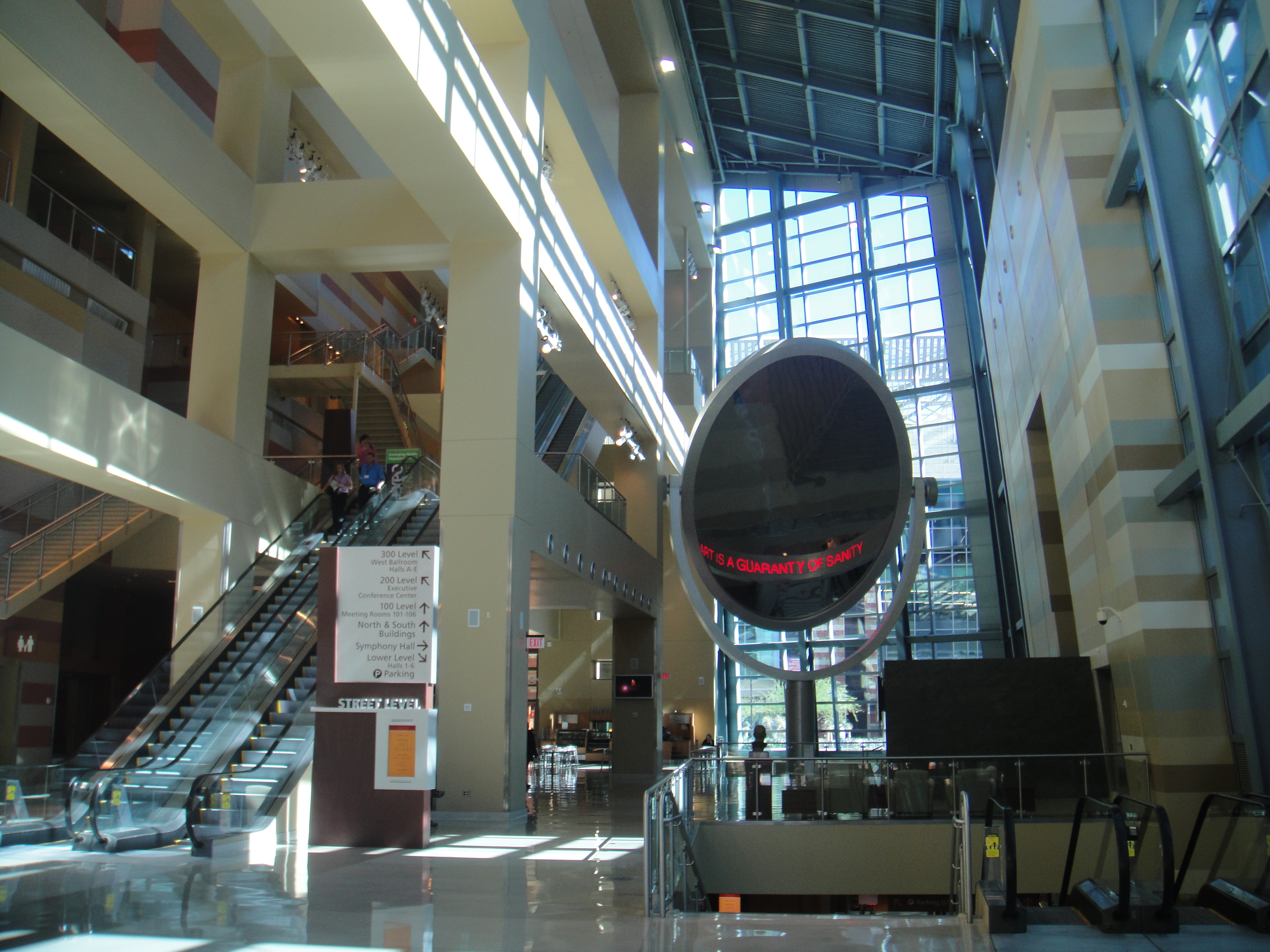
The lobby inside the west building

The Convention Center consists of three buildings. The North and West buildings are connected by a lower level 502,500 square feet (46,680 m^{2}) exhibit hall and a skyway bridge. Between them, they have 81 meeting rooms and two large ballrooms. The stand-alone South building has a 143,300 square feet (13,310 m^{2}) exhibit space, 18 meeting rooms, and a 28,000 square feet (2,600 m^{2}) ballroom. Third Street between the North and West Buildings can be used as an 80,000 square feet (7,400 m^{2}) outdoor event space.

== Musical concerts ==
Several concerts by well known national and international acts took place at the Civic Plaza from 1973 to 1998, including Chile's La Ley, Puerto Rico's former Menudo members El Reencuentro, Santana, Marilyn Manson, Fleetwood Mac, Deep Purple, The Offspring, Mötley Crüe, Tool and others.

== See also ==
- 1997 Major League Baseball expansion draft, held at the Phoenix Civic Plaza (as it was then known)
- List of convention centers in the United States
