= Chuck Backus =

American educator (born 1937)

Charles Edward Backus (born September 17, 1937) was vice president and provost of Arizona State University's east campus until his retirement in 2004.

He currently is president of the Arizona State University Research Park, a business and recreational park that is operated by Arizona State University in Tempe, Arizona (a suburb of Phoenix). He has endowed a scholarship, at Arizona State University Polytechnic.
