= A Line (Valley Metro) =

Light rail line in Phoenix, Tempe, and Mesa, Arizona

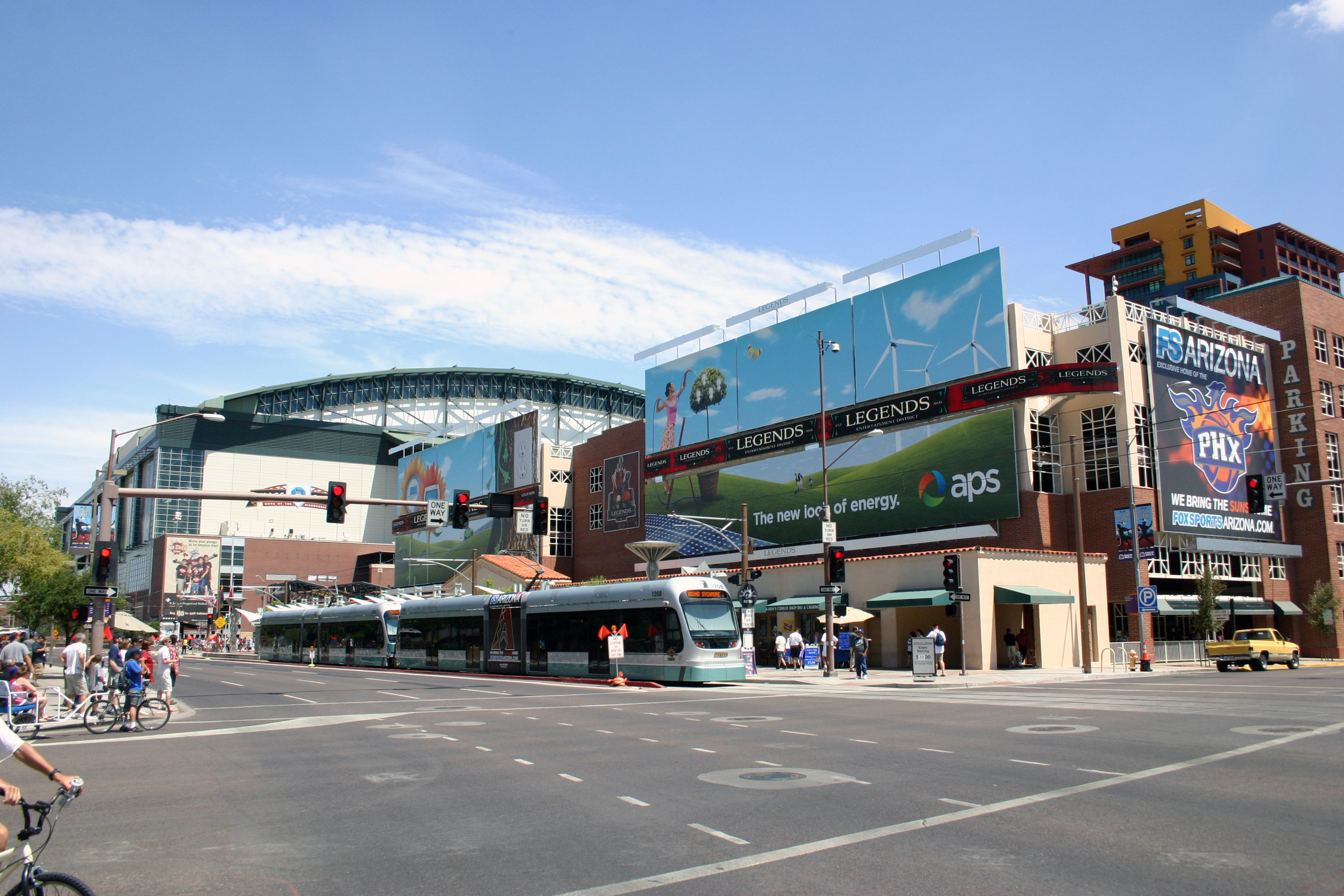
- A light rail train passing Chase Field

Overview
- Owner: Valley Metro
- Locale: Phoenix, Tempe, and Mesa, Arizona
- Stations: 26

Service
- System: Valley Metro Rail & Streetcar

History
- Opened: December 27, 2008

Technical
- Track gauge: 1,435 mm (4 ft 8 1/2 in) standard gauge
- Electrification: Overhead line, 750 V DC
Route map
A Line highlighted in blue

The A Line is a light rail line which serves Phoenix, Tempe, and Mesa, Arizona. It is the east-west line of the Valley Metro Rail & Streetcar system, running from Downtown Phoenix to the east. With the inauguration of the two-line system in 2025, the A Line was split from its former routing north of downtown and was rerouted to terminate at the Downtown Phoenix Hub.

== Service description ==
=== Route description ===
The A Line starts at the Downtown Phoenix Hub. Eastbound service runs on First Avenue south before turning east on Jefferson Street; likewise, westbound one-way service starts at 26th Street on Washington Street before turning north on Central Avenue.

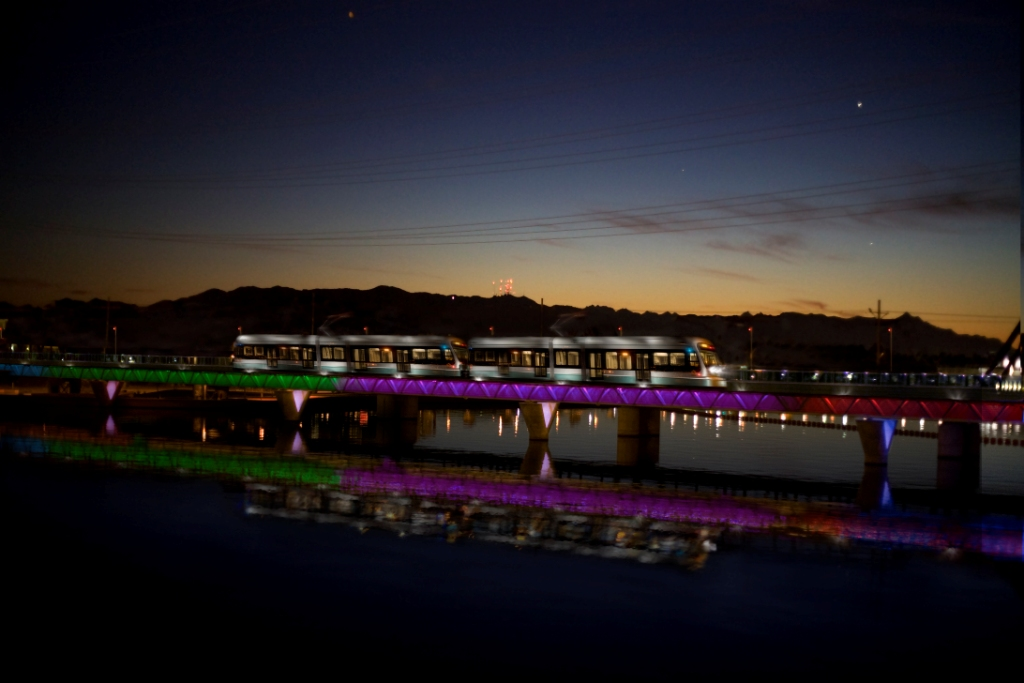
Valley Metro Rail train at night on Tempe Town Lake, 2008

Both tracks rejoin east of 24th Street on Washington Street. Continuing east on Washington, the rail line passes Phoenix Sky Harbor Airport, which is connected by the PHX Sky Train at 44th Street/Washington, and then turns southeast towards Tempe. After Center Parkway/Washington station, the line leaves the median of Washington Street and runs south on a bridge that crosses Tempe Town Lake, parallel to the Union Pacific Railroad. It then turns east along Mill Avenue and connects to the Valley Metro Streetcar at Mill Avenue/3rd St before proceeding via its own right-of-way near Arizona State University. Going southward, it joins Apache Boulevard headed eastward, which becomes Main Street in Mesa. The light rail line ends at an intersection with Gilbert Road at Gilbert Road/Main Street station.

=== Hours and frequency ===
Time	4A	5A	6A	7A	8A-1P	2-6P	7P	8P-12A
Weekdays	12						20	
Saturdays	15						20	
Sundays/holidays	20							

=== Station listing ===
The following table lists the stations of the A Line, from west to east.

Station	Date opened	City (neighborhood)	Major connections and notes
Downtown Phoenix Hub	December 27, 2008	Phoenix (Downtown)	B Line (Valley Metro)
3rd Street/Jefferson (eastbound only)	December 27, 2008	Phoenix (Downtown)	
3rd Street/Washington (westbound only)	December 27, 2008	Phoenix (Downtown)	
12th Street/Jefferson (eastbound only)	December 27, 2008	Phoenix (Monroe)	
12th Street/Washington (westbound only)	December 27, 2008	Phoenix (Monroe)	
24th Street/Jefferson (eastbound only)	December 27, 2008	Phoenix (Monroe)	
24th Street/Washington (westbound only)	December 27, 2008	Phoenix (Monroe)	
38th Street/Washington	December 27, 2008	Phoenix (Pueblo Grande)	Park and rideː 190
44th Street/Washington	December 27, 2008	Phoenix (Pueblo Grande)	PHX Sky Train
50th Street/Washington	Apr 25, 2019	Phoenix (Tessera)	
Priest Drive/Washington	December 27, 2008	Tempe (North Tempe)	
Center Parkway/Washington	December 27, 2008	Tempe (North Tempe)	
Mill Avenue/3rd Street	December 27, 2008	Tempe (Rio Salado)	S Line (Valley Metro)
Veterans Way/College Avenue	December 27, 2008	Tempe (Rio Salado)	
University Drive/Rural	December 27, 2008	Tempe (Rio Salado)	
Dorsey/Apache Boulevard	December 27, 2008	Tempe (Apache)	Park and rideː 190
McClintock/Apache Boulevard	December 27, 2008	Tempe (Apache)	Park and rideː 300
Smith–Martin/Apache Boulevard	December 27, 2008	Tempe (Apache)	
Price–101 Freeway/Apache Boulevard	December 27, 2008	Tempe (Apache)	Park and rideː 693
Sycamore/Main Street	December 27, 2008	Mesa (Downtown)	Park and rideː 802
Alma School/Main Street	August 22, 2015	Mesa (Downtown)	
Country Club/Main Street	August 22, 2015	Mesa (Downtown)	
Center/Main Street	August 22, 2015	Mesa (Downtown)	
Mesa Drive/Main Street	August 22, 2015	Mesa (Downtown)	Park and rideː 448
Stapley/Main Street	May 18, 2019	Mesa (Downtown)	
Gilbert Road/Main Street	May 18, 2019	Mesa (Downtown)	Park and rideː 250

== History ==
The line between Downtown Phoenix and Sycamore/Main Street station is a segment of the inaugural Valley Metro Rail system, which opened in 2008. Subsequent extensions in 2015 and 2019 brought the eastern terminus to Gilbert Road/Main Street station. As the South Central Extension was constructed, the intersection of the north-south and east-west rail segments was designed to act as a transfer point. The A Line split into its own service on June 7, 2025.

== Future developments ==
=== Capitol Extension ===
The Capitol Extension will run from Central Station and the Downtown Phoenix Hub in Downtown Phoenix west to 15th Avenue, adding 0.8 miles (1.3 km) and two stations. As of 2024, environmental assessment work was underway.

=== I-10 West Extension ===
The I-10 West Extension will run from 15th Avenue west to Interstate 17 before turning north to the interchange of Interstate 10 and I-17 ("The Stack"). Then the line will turn west and continue down I-10 in the median past 43rd Avenue. It will go over the westbound lanes of I-10 to continue alongside the highway to Desert Sky Mall, adding 10 miles (16 km) and 8 stations to connect the West Valley and ease congestion on Interstate 10. The line will transfer over I-10 from the median to the shoulder at 47th Avenue, which will connect with I-10 around 51st Avenue with an elevated station. In the fall of 2021, the Phoenix City Council approved extending the project corridor to the Desert Sky Transit Center, adjacent to the Desert Sky Mall.
