= Arizona State University Research Park =

Business and recreation center

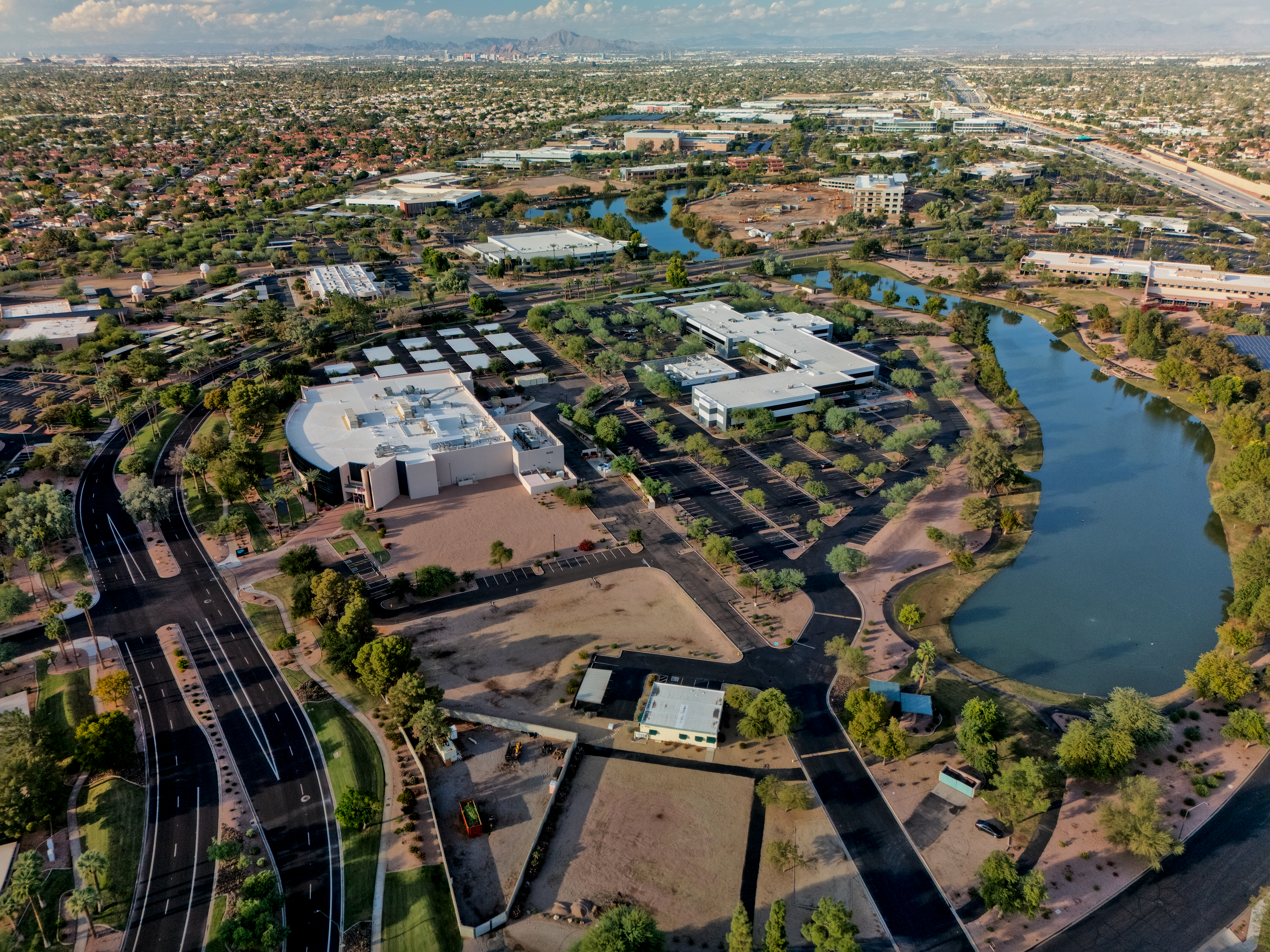
- South aerial view of ASU Research Park
- Interactive map of Arizona State University Research Park
- Type: Business Park Recreational Park
- Location: Tempe, Arizona, United States
- Coordinates: 33°20′34″N 111°53′52″W
- Area: 320 acres (1.3 km^{2}) 18 acres for 3 Lakes
- Operator: Arizona State University
- Open: All year

The Arizona State University Research Park is a business and recreational park that is operated by Arizona State University. Located in the city of Tempe, Arizona, United States; the park sits on eastern half of the square mile bordered on the north by East Elliot Road, on the east by the Arizona State Highway: Route Loop 101 Price Freeway, on the south by East Warner Road, and the west by South McClintock Drive. Chuck Backus, formerly vice president and provost of ASU's East Campus, was elected as the President of the ASU Research Park in spring 2005.

Amazon has multiple offices in the Research Park including Amazon AZA1 (8375 S River Pkwy) and Amazon AZA10 (8600 S Science Dr).

== ASU Research Park amenities ==
- Access to the State Route 101 Price Freeway
- Daycare facility on site
- City Buses (Valley Metro)
  - Route 81 (North-South McClintock/Hayden)
  - Route 108 (East-West Elliot)
  - Route 511 (Chandler-Scottsdale Express via State Route 101)
- FAA approved helipad
- Access to services provided by ASU only for tenants
- Three artificial lakes

== List of Companies in the Research Park ==
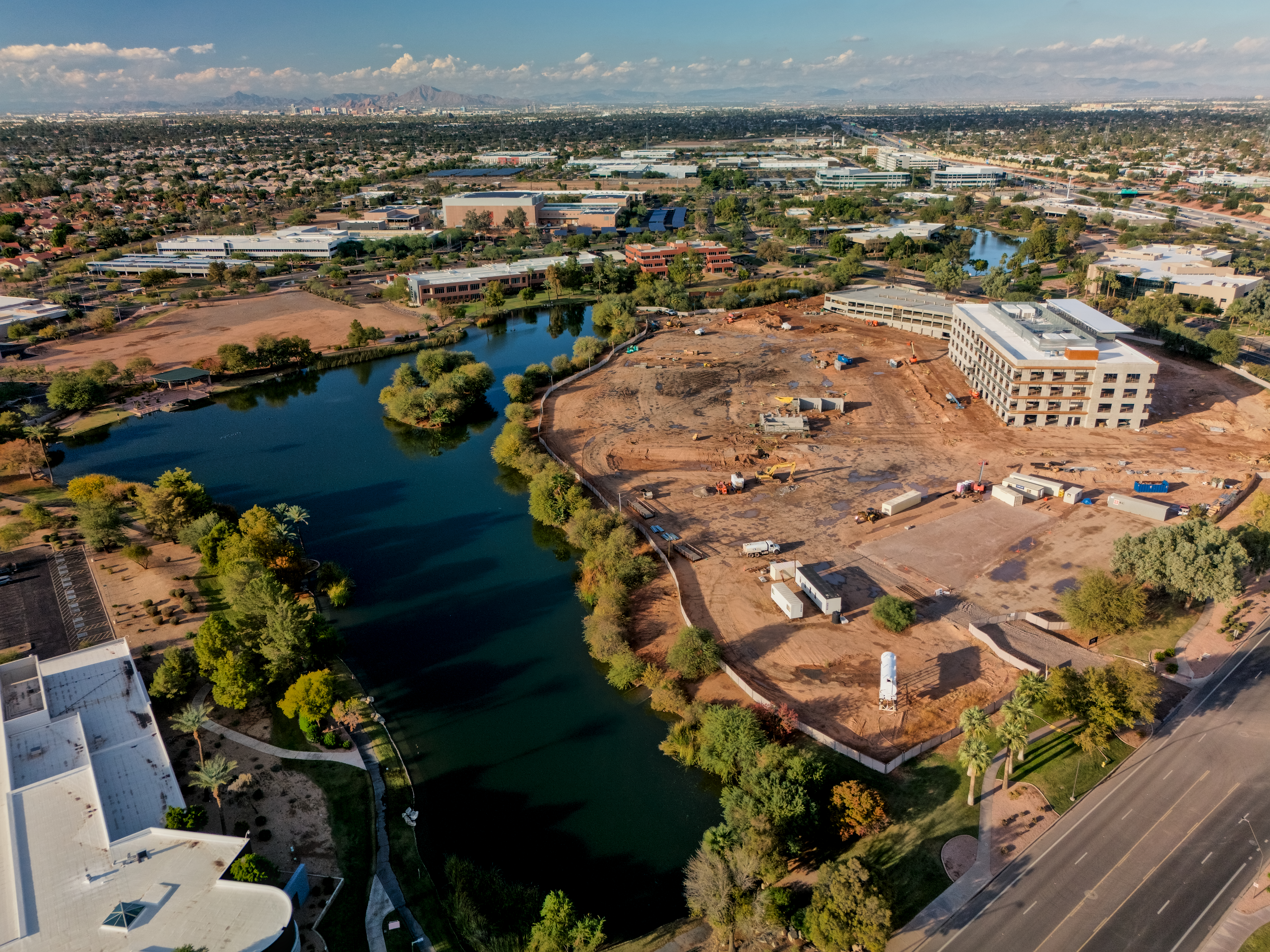
ViaSat under construction at lot 24 in November 2023

- Aerials Express
- American PEO, Inc.
- Anadigm
- ASE
- ASML Holding
- Avnet
- Bridgestone-Firestone
- Bright Horizons
- Camisa Technologies, Inc.
- Ceco Concrete
- Center for Applied NanoBioscience
- CMC Interconnect Technologies
- Countrywide Financial
- Credence Systems
- Edward Jones Investments
- Etched In Time
- EV Group (EVG)
- Fat Cat Animations
- Flexible Display Center at ASU
- GaNotec Inc.
- GE Healthcare
- Great Wall Semiconductor
- Honeywell
- Infocrossing
- Iridium Satellite LLC
- Institute for Supply Management
- Ito America
- Laser Components DG Inc.
- Linear Technology
- Martin Collier Phillips Corporation
- North Central Association of Colleges and Schools
- Nexus Energy Software
- PADT
- Philips
- PowerOneData, Inc.
- Reproductive Medical Institute
- Systrends
- Texas Instruments
- Thomas & Betts
- Titan Formwork Systems
- Walgreens
