= Downtown Phoenix Hub =

Light rail hub in Downtown Phoenix, Arizona

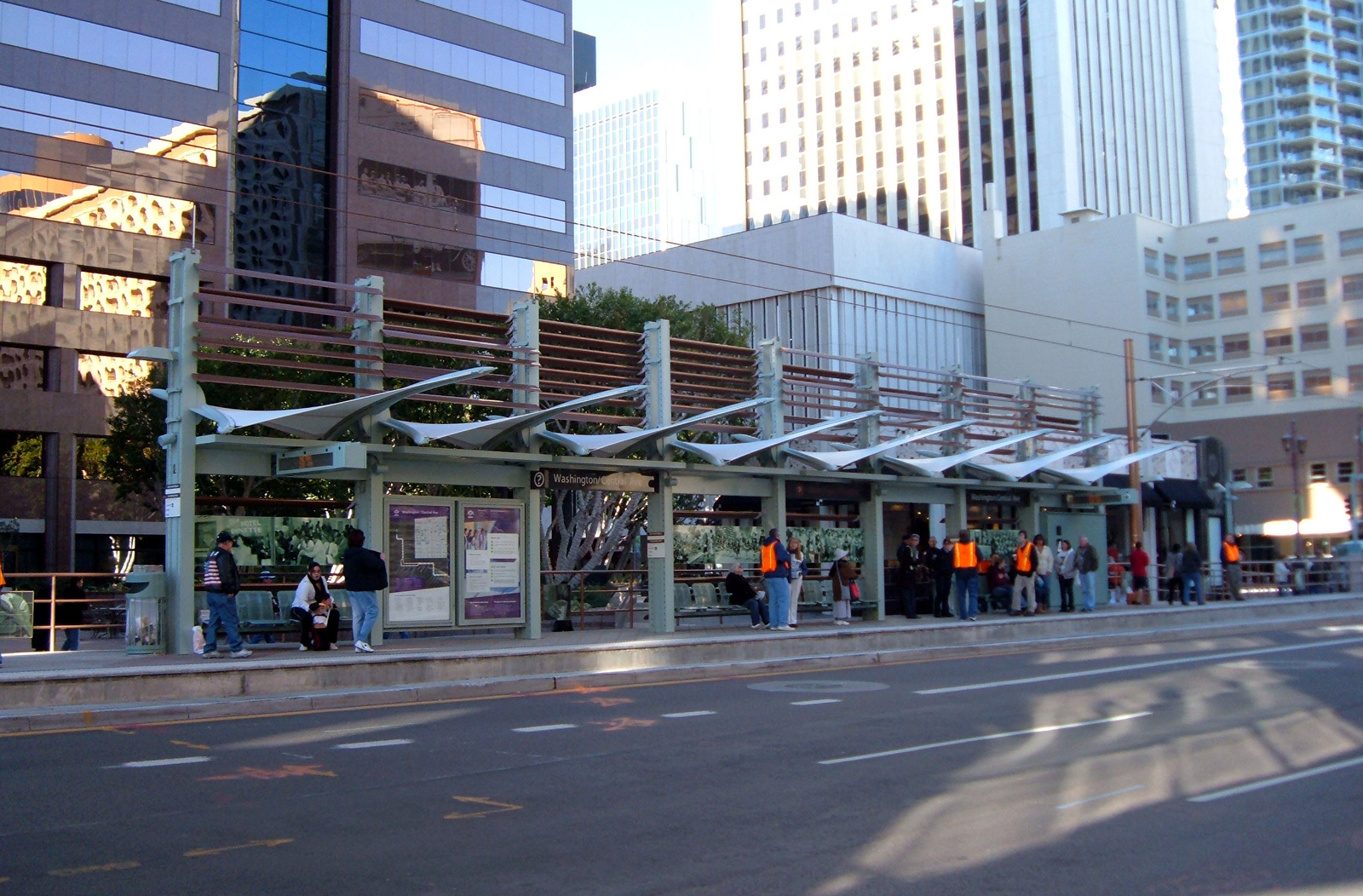
- Washington/Central Avenue platform in December 2008

General information
- Other names: Downtown Phoenix; City Hall; Downtown Hub
- Location: 1st Avenue and Jefferson Street; Central Avenue and Washington Street, Phoenix, Arizona; United States
- Coordinates: 33°26′53.75″N 112°4′28.50″W
- Owner: Valley Metro
- Operator: Valley Metro Rail & Streetcar
- Platforms: 4 side platforms
- Tracks: 4
- Connections: Valley Metro Bus: 0, 8, Phoenix Downtown DASH, Grand Avenue Limited, 514, 520, 521, 522, 531, 533, 535, 541, 542, 562, 563, 571, 573, 575, I-10 East RAPID, I-10 West RAPID, I-17 RAPID, South Mountain East RAPID, South Mountain West RAPID

Construction
- Structure type: At-grade
- Accessible: Yes

Other information
- Station code: 10013, 10032

History
- Opened: December 27, 2008
- Rebuilt: June 7, 2025
- Former names: Jefferson/1st Ave; Washington/Central Ave

Services
Preceding station	Valley Metro	Following station
Downtown Phoenix Hub
Terminus	A Line	3rd Street/Washington One-way operation
Terminus	A Line	3rd Street/Jefferson toward Gilbert Road/Main Street
Van Buren/Central Avenue toward Metro Parkway	B Line	Lincoln/Central Avenue One-way operation
Van Buren/1st Avenue One-way operation	B Line	Lincoln/1st Avenue toward Baseline/Central Avenue
Washington/Central Avenue
Van Buren/Central Avenue toward Metro Parkway	B Line (mornings only)	Lincoln/Central Avenue One-way operation
Location

The Downtown Phoenix Hub, also collectively known as Downtown Hub and City Hall, is a light rail hub on the A and B lines of the Valley Metro Rail & Streetcar system in Downtown Phoenix, Arizona. It is the western terminus of the A Line. The hub is located at the block formed by Central Avenue, 1st Avenue, Jefferson Street, and Washington Street. It comprises four one-way side platforms: the northbound B Line platform on Central Avenue, the southbound B Line platform on 1st Avenue, the eastbound A Line platform on Jefferson Street, and the terminating westbound A Line platform on Washington Street. The hub serves riders as the transfer point between the A and B lines. A fifth side platform at Washington/Central Avenue station located one block north of the hub is only used for early morning northbound trips on the B Line.

When opened in 2008, the two platforms at Jefferson/1st Avenue and Washington/Central Avenue were paired as the Downtown Phoenix stations of the light rail starter system. When the South Central Extension opened on June 7, 2025, Valley Metro introduced a new two-line system with the A and B lines with an expanded and rebuilt hub. New platforms were constructed on Central Avenue, Jefferson Street, and Washington Street. The pre-existing platform at Jefferson/1st Avenue was integrated into the new hub, while the pre-existing platform at Washington/Central Avenue on the northwestern side of that intersection was relegated to use only during early mornings.

The A Line runs from the Downtown Phoenix Hub to Gilbert Road/Main Street. The B Line runs from Metro Parkway to Baseline/Central Avenue.

== Ridership ==
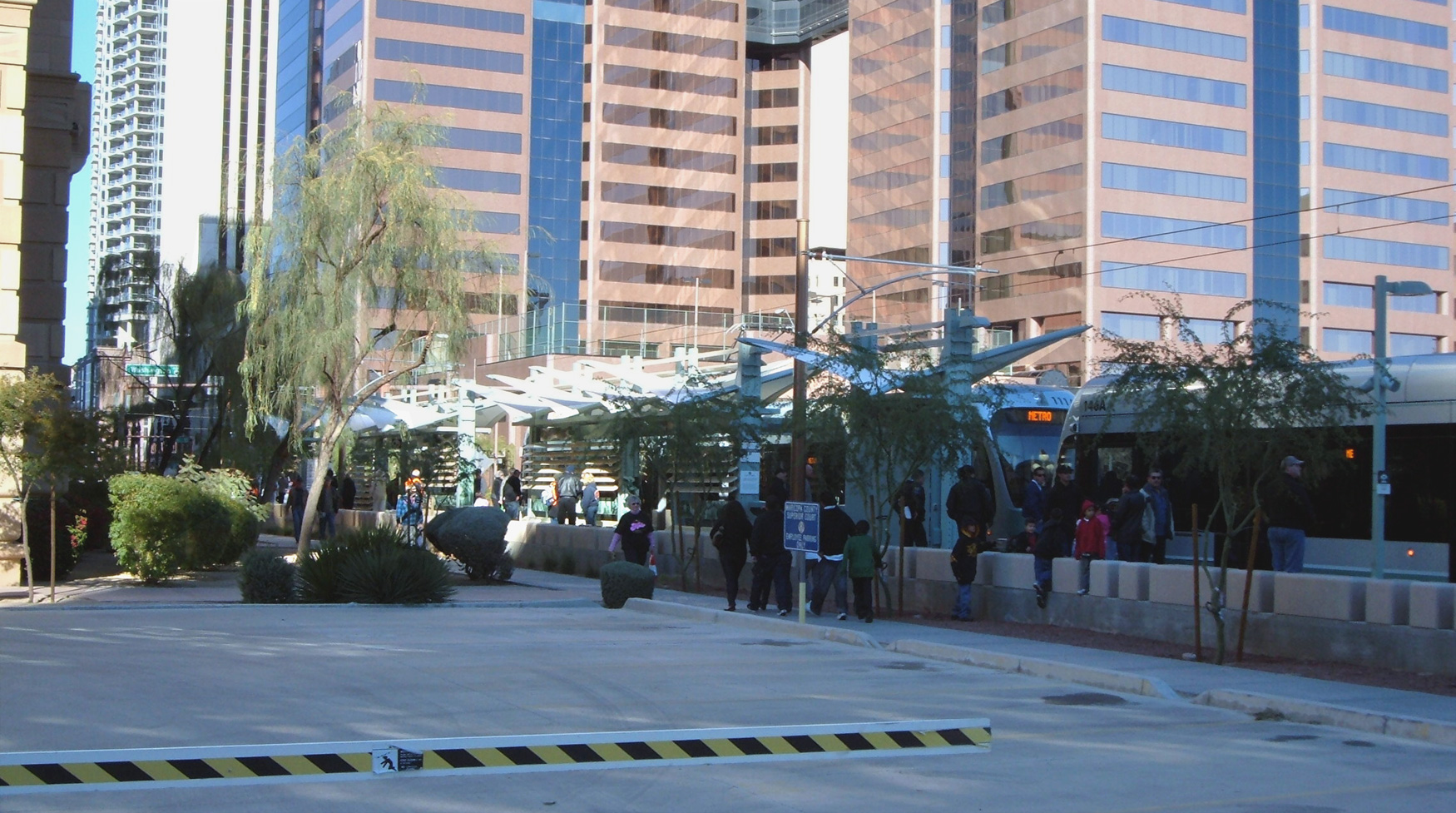
Jefferson/1st Avenue platform in December 2008

Weekday rail passengers
Year	In	Out	Average daily in	Average daily out
2009	444,401	488,520	1,750	1,923
2010	452,638	453,667	1,789	1,793

== Notable places nearby ==
- Phoenix City Hall
- Cityscape
- Orpheum Theatre
- Arizona Financial Theatre
- Phoenix Union Station

== Connections ==
Valley Metro Bus	Route number	Route name
Valley Metro Bus	0	Central Avenue
Valley Metro Bus	514	Scottsdale Express
Valley Metro Bus	521	Central Tempe Express
Valley Metro Bus	522	South Tempe Express
Valley Metro Bus	531	Mesa/Gilbert Express
Valley Metro Bus	533	Mesa Express
Valley Metro Bus	535	Northeast Mesa Express
Valley Metro Bus	542	Chandler Express
Valley Metro Bus	562	Goodyear Express
Valley Metro Bus	563	Avondale/Buckeye Express
Valley Metro Bus	571	Surprise Express
Valley Metro Bus	573	West Glendale Express
Valley Metro Bus	575	North Glendale Express
Valley Metro Bus	DASH	Phoenix Downtown DASH
Valley Metro Bus	GAL	Grand Avenue Limited
Valley Metro Bus	I-10E	I-10 East RAPID
Valley Metro Bus	I-10W	I-10 West RAPID
Valley Metro Bus	I-17	I-17 RAPID
Valley Metro Bus	SME	South Mountain East RAPID
Valley Metro Bus	SMW	South Mountain West RAPID
Valley Metro Bus	SR-51	SR-51 RAPID
