= Gilbert Road/Main Street station =

Light rail station in Mesa, Arizona

Gilbert Rd/Main St

General information
- Location: Main Street and Gilbert Road, Mesa, Arizona; United States
- Coordinates: 33.41537°N 111.78762°W
- Owner: Valley Metro
- Operator: Valley Metro Rail & Streetcar
- Platforms: 1 island platform
- Tracks: 2
- Connections: Valley Metro Bus: 40, 45, 136

Construction
- Structure type: At-grade
- Accessible: Yes

Other information
- Station code: 18178

History
- Opened: May 18, 2019

Services
| Preceding station | Valley Metro | Following station |
|---|---|---|
| Stapley/Main Street toward Downtown Phoenix Hub | A Line | Terminus |
Location

Gilbert Road/Main Street station is a light rail station in Mesa, Arizona, on the A Line of the Valley Metro Rail & Streetcar system serving Phoenix and surrounding areas. It opened to revenue service on May 18, 2019, becoming the new terminus of the light rail line. It is the eastern terminus of the A Line. The station consists of one island platform in the median of Main Street to the west of Gilbert Road with both tracks serving westbound trains. The station has a park-and-ride facility and a bus station that is served by local routes.

The two-station 1.9-mile (3.1 km) Gilbert Road Extension began construction in November 2016 and was expected to cost $184 million.

== Nearby points of interest ==
- Consolidated Canal/Maricopa Trail

== Connections ==
| Valley Metro Bus | Route number | Route name | North/east end | South/west end | |
|---|---|---|---|---|---|
| Valley Metro Bus | 40 | Main Street | Superstition Springs Transit Center | Sycamore/Main Street Transit Center | Terminus (select weekday trips) |
| Valley Metro Bus | 45 | Broadway Road | Superstition Springs Transit Center | 19th Avenue/Broadway Road | |
| Valley Metro Bus | 136 | Gilbert Road | Gilbert Road/McDowell Road Park-and-Ride | Gilbert Road/Insight Way/Ryan Road | Gilbert Road/Chandler Boulevard (select weekday trips) |
