= Phoenix, Arizona =

Capital and most populous city of Arizona, U.S.

Phoenix
- State capital city
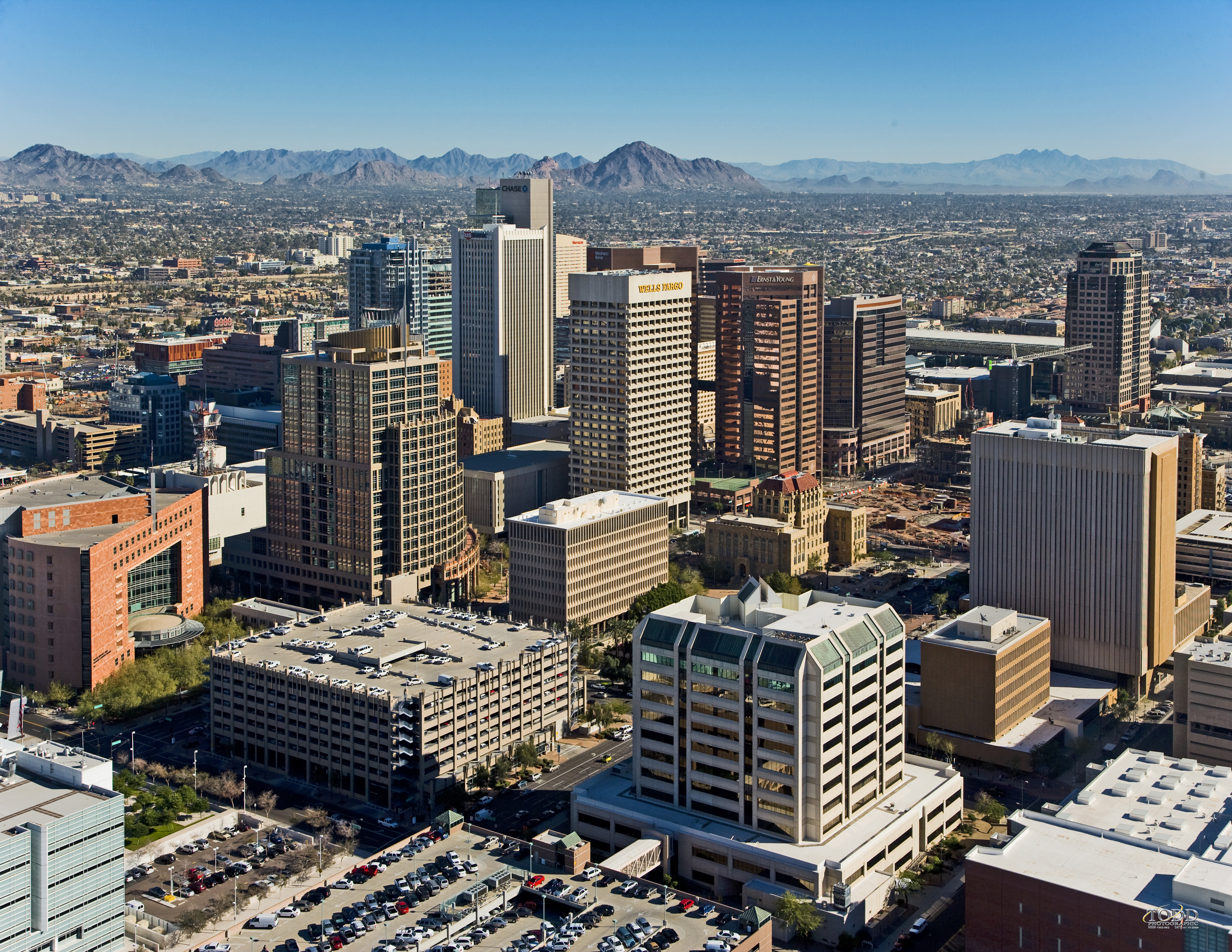
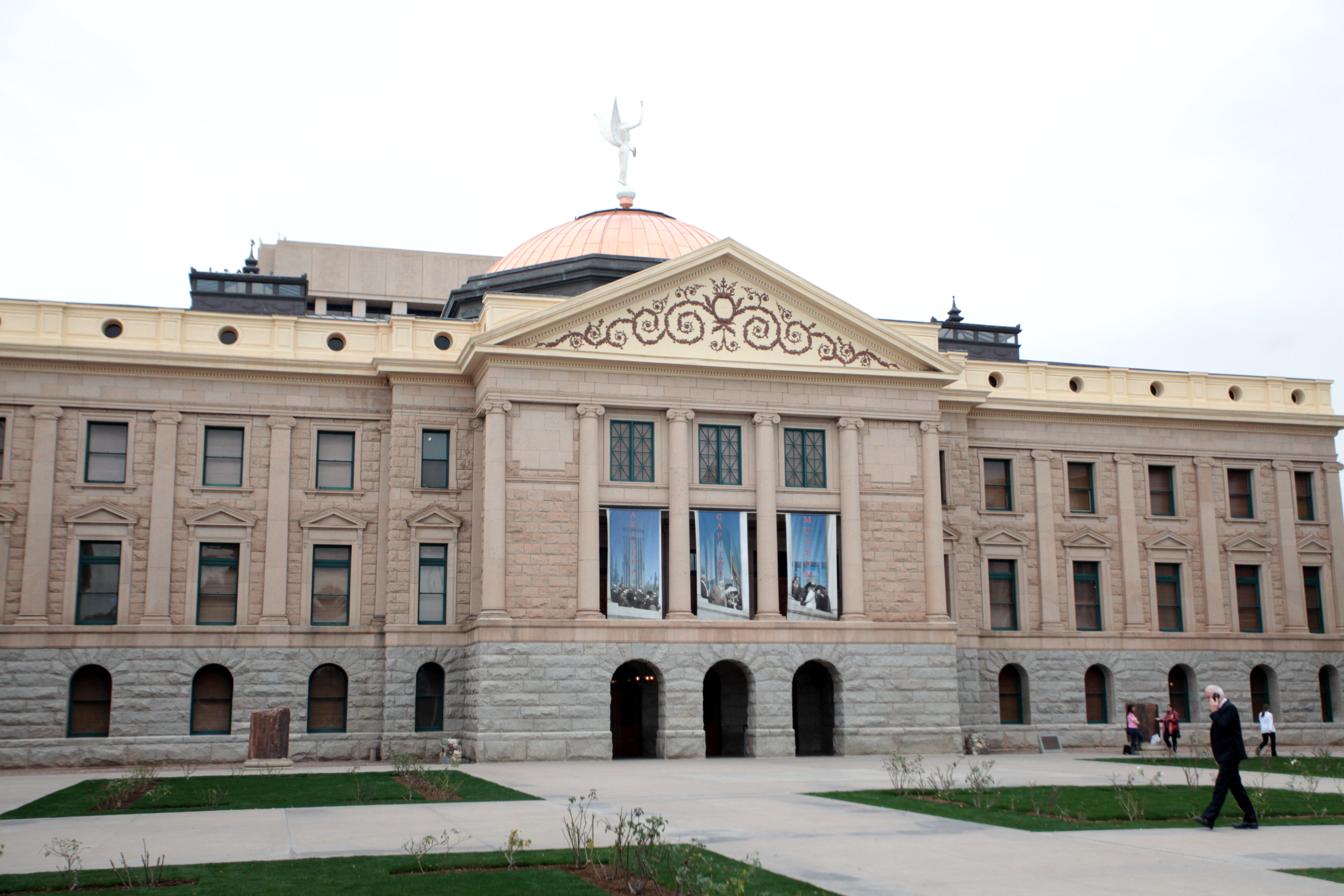
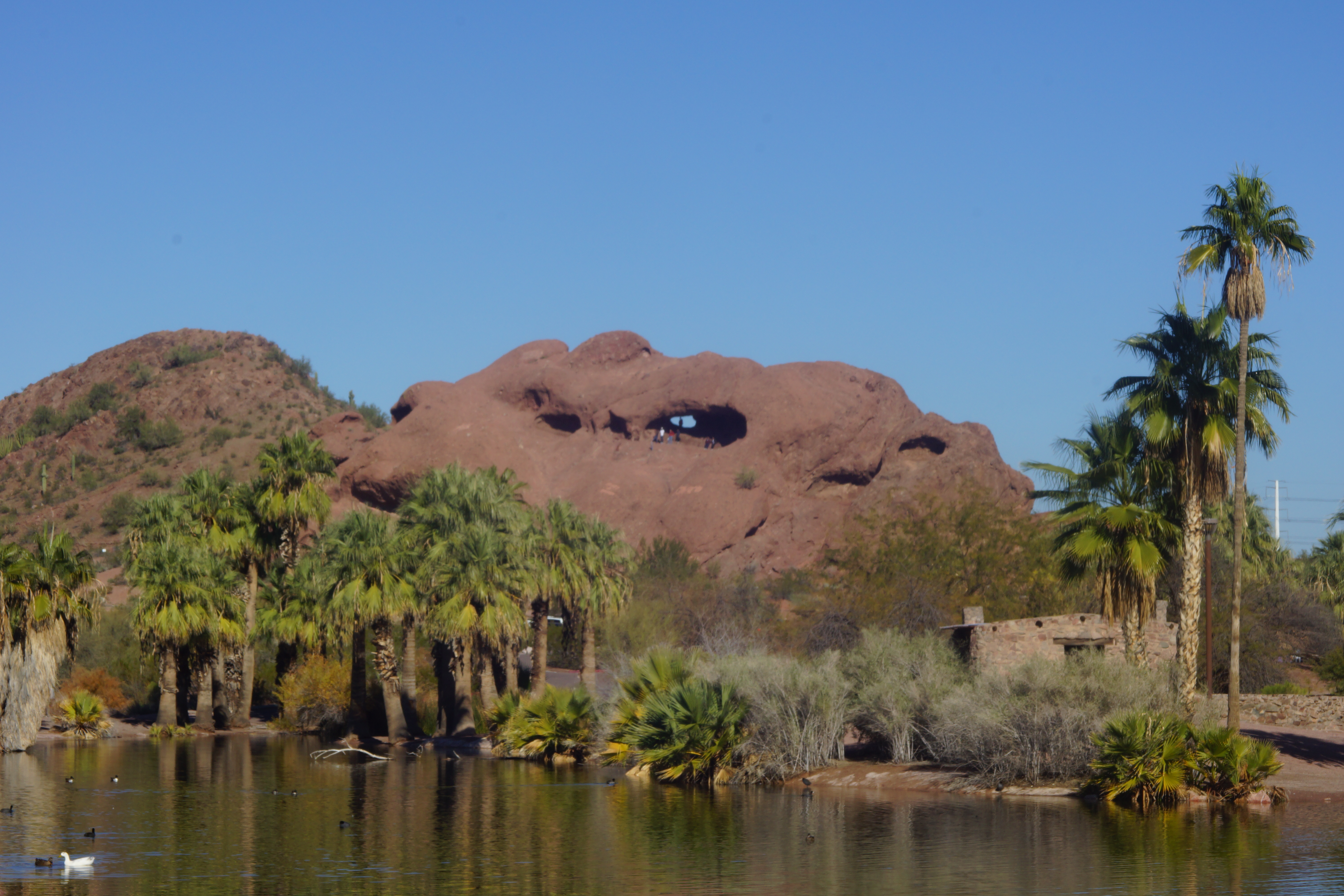
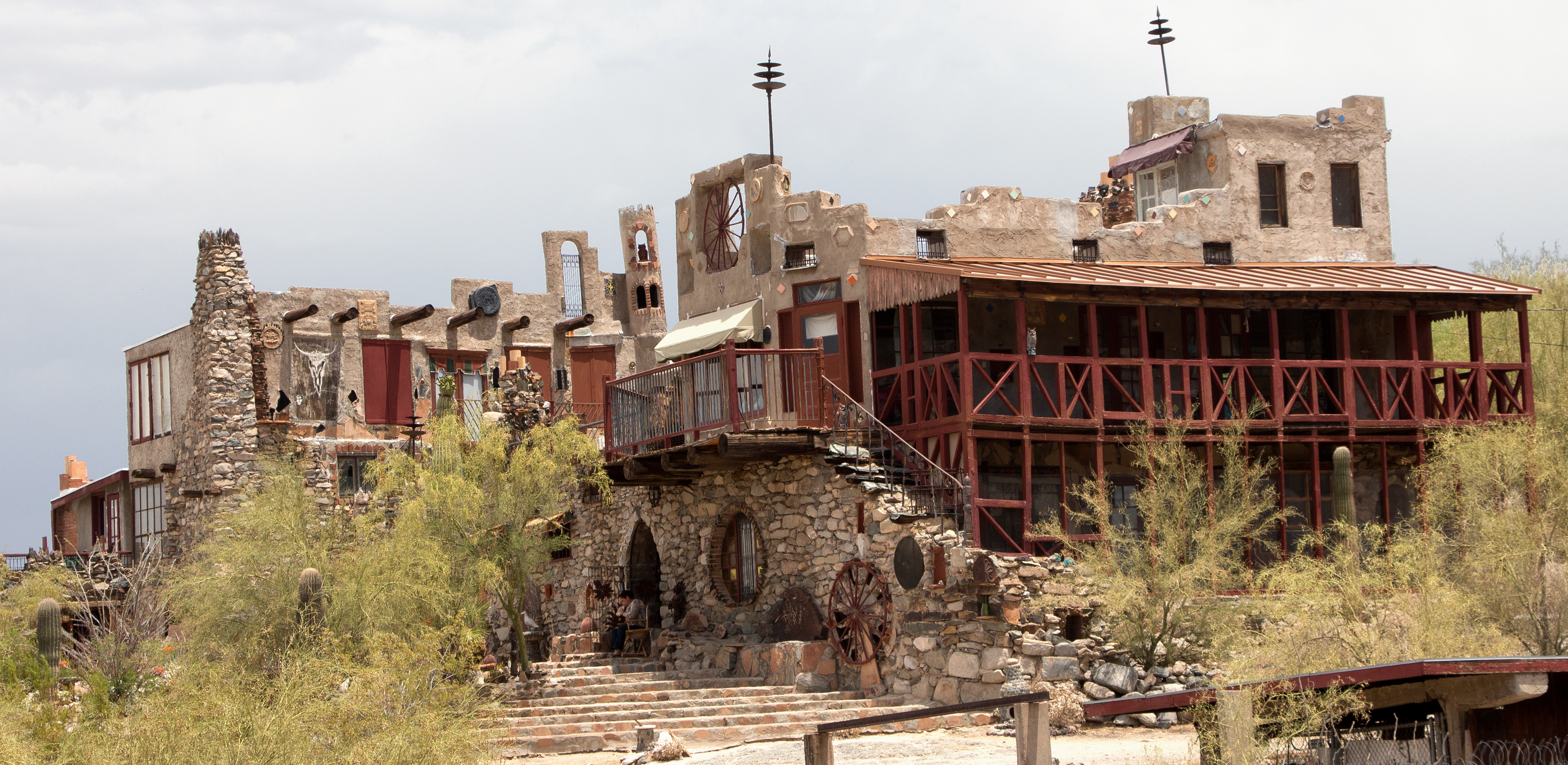
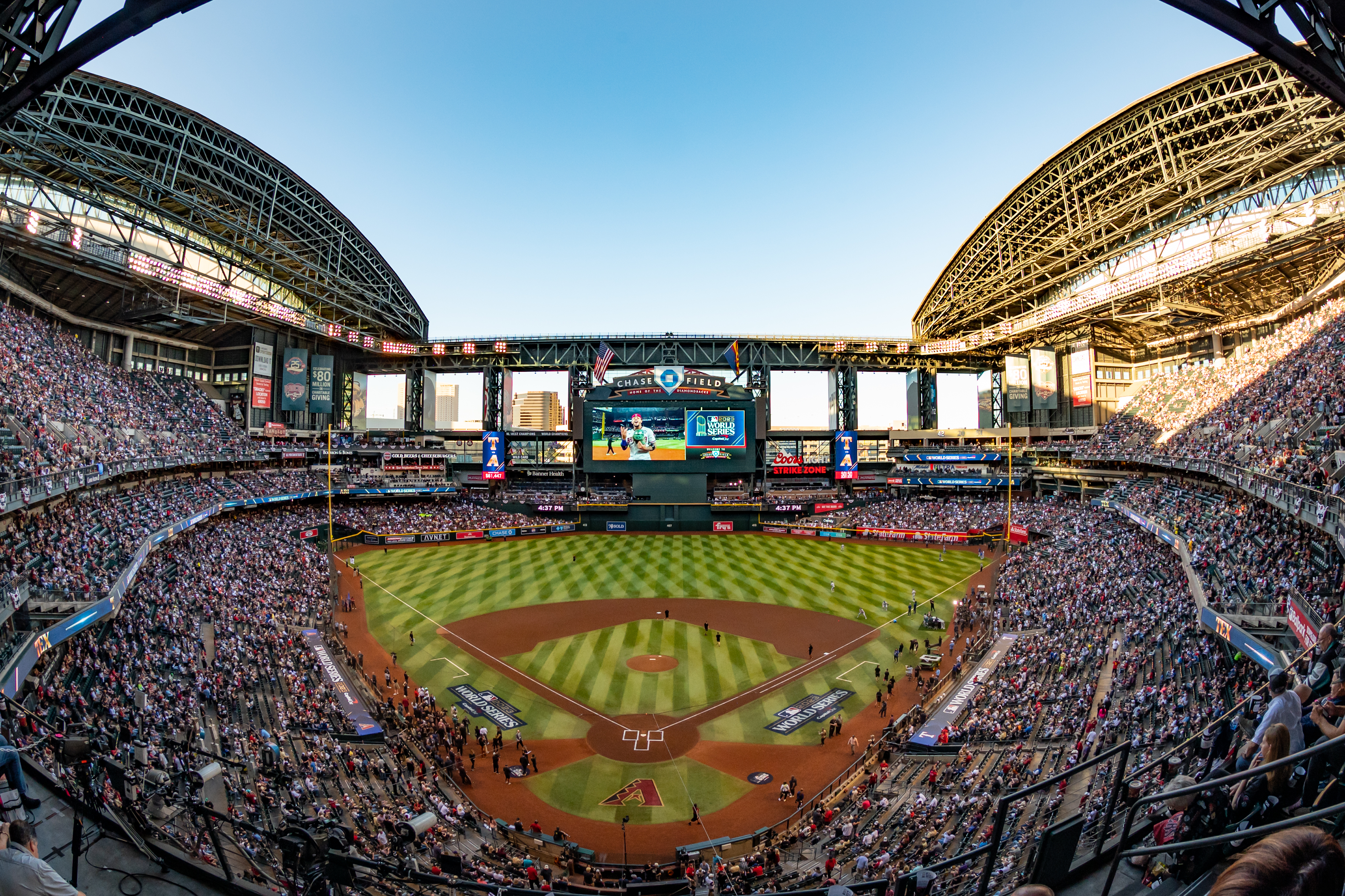
- Downtown Phoenix Arizona State Capitol Papago Park Rosson House St. Mary's Basilica Mystery Castle Chase Field

- Flag Logo
- Nicknames: Valley of the Sun; The Valley
- Interactive map of Phoenix
- Location within Arizona Location within the United States
- Coordinates: 33°26′54″N 112°04′26″W
- Country: United States
- State: Arizona
- County: Maricopa
- Settled: 1867; 159 years ago
- Incorporated: February 25, 1881
- Founder: Jack Swilling
- Named for: Phoenix, mythical creature

Government
  - Type: Council–manager
  - Body: Phoenix City Council
  - Mayor: Kate Gallego (D)

Area
  - State capital: 519.28 sq mi (1,344.94 km^{2})
  - Land: 518.26 sq mi (1,342.30 km^{2})
  - Water: 1.02 sq mi (2.63 km^{2})
- Elevation: 1,086 ft (331 m)

Population (2020)
  - State capital: 1,608,139
  - Estimate (2025): 1,665,481 ▲
  - Rank: 10th in North America; 5th in the United States; 1st in Arizona
  - Density: 3,102.9/sq mi (1,198.04/km^{2})
  - Urban: 3,976,313 (US: 11th)
  - Urban density: 3,581/sq mi (1,382.5/km^{2})
  - Metro: 4,845,832 (US: 10th)
- Demonym: Phoenician

GDP
  - Metro: $398.129 billion (2023)
- Time zone: UTC−07:00 (MST)
- ZIP Codes: 85001–85024, 85026-85038, 85040-85046, 85048, 85050-85051, 85053-85054, 85060-85064, 85066-85072, 85074, 85076, 85078-85080, 85082-85083, 85085-85087
- Area codes: East: 480; Central: 602; West: 623
- FIPS code: 04-55000
- GNIS feature ID: 44784
- Website: phoenix.gov

Phoenix (/ˈfiːnɪks/ FEE-niks) is the capital and most populous city of the U.S. state of Arizona. With over 1.6 million residents at the 2020 census, Phoenix is the fifth-most populous city in the United States and the most populous state capital. The Phoenix metropolitan area, with an estimated 5.19 million residents, is the tenth-most populous metropolitan area in the U.S. and the most populous in the Mountain states and Southwest. Phoenix is the county seat of Maricopa County in the Salt River Valley and Arizona Sun Corridor and, with an area of 517.9 square miles (1,341 square kilometers), is the largest city by area in Arizona and 11th-largest city by area in the United States.

Phoenix was settled in 1867 as an agricultural community near the confluence of the Salt and Gila Rivers and was incorporated as a city in 1881. It became the capital of the Arizona Territory in 1889. Its canal system led to a thriving farming community with the original settlers' crops, such as alfalfa, cotton, citrus, and hay, remaining important parts of the local economy for decades. Cotton, cattle, citrus, climate, and copper were known locally as the "Five C's" anchoring Phoenix's economy. These remained the driving forces of the city until after World War II, when high-tech companies began to move into the valley and air conditioning made Phoenix's hot summers more bearable.

Phoenix is the cultural center of Arizona. It is in the northeastern reaches of the Sonoran Desert and is known for its hot desert climate. The region's gross domestic product reached over $362 billion by 2022. The city averaged a four percent annual population growth rate over a 40-year period from the mid-1960s to the mid-2000s, and was among the nation's ten most populous cities by 1980. Phoenix is also one of the largest plurality Hispanic cities in the United States, with 42% of its population being Hispanic.

== History ==
=== Early history ===
Map of Hohokam lands c. 1350

The Hohokam people occupied the Phoenix area for 2,000 years. They created roughly 135 miles (217 kilometers) of irrigation canals, making the desert land arable, and paths of these canals were used for the Arizona Canal, Central Arizona Project Canal, and the Hayden-Rhodes Aqueduct. They also carried out extensive trade with the nearby Ancestral Puebloans, Mogollon, and Sinagua, as well as with the more distant Mesoamerican civilizations. It is believed periods of drought and severe floods between 1300 and 1450 led to the Hohokam civilization's abandonment of the area.

After the departure of the Hohokam, groups of Akimel O'odham (commonly known as Pima), Tohono O'odham, and Maricopa tribes began to use the area, as well as segments of the Yavapai and Apache. The O'odham were offshoots of the Sobaipuri tribe, who in turn were thought to be the descendants of the Hohokam.

The Akimel O'odham were the major group in the area. They lived in small villages with well-defined irrigation systems that spread over the Gila River Valley, from Florence in the east to the Estrellas in the west. Their crops included corn, beans, and squash for food as well as cotton and tobacco. They banded with the Maricopa for protection against incursions by the Yuma and Apache tribes. The Maricopa are part of the larger Yuma people; however, they migrated east from the lower Colorado and Gila Rivers in the early 1800s, when they began to be enemies with other Yuma tribes, settling among the existing communities of the Akimel O'odham.

The Tohono O'odham also lived in the region, but largely to the south and all the way to the Mexican border. The O'odham lived in small settlements as seasonal farmers who took advantage of the rains, rather than the large-scale irrigation of the Akimel. They grew crops such as sweet corn, tapary beans, squash, lentils, sugar cane, and melons, as well as taking advantage of native plants such as saguaro fruits, cholla buds, mesquite tree beans, and mesquite candy (sap from the mesquite tree). They also hunted local game such as deer, rabbit, and javelina for meat.

The Mexican–American War ended in 1848, Mexico ceded its northern zone to the United States, and the region's residents became U.S. citizens. The Phoenix area became part of the New Mexico Territory. In 1863, the mining town of Wickenburg was the first to be established in Maricopa County, to the northwest of Phoenix. Maricopa County had not been incorporated; the land was within Yavapai County, which included the major town of Prescott to the north of Wickenburg.

The Army created Fort McDowell on the Verde River in 1865 to forestall Indian uprisings. The fort established a camp on the south side of the Salt River by 1866, which was the first settlement in the valley after the decline of the Hohokam. Other nearby settlements later merged to become the city of Tempe.

=== Founding and incorporation ===
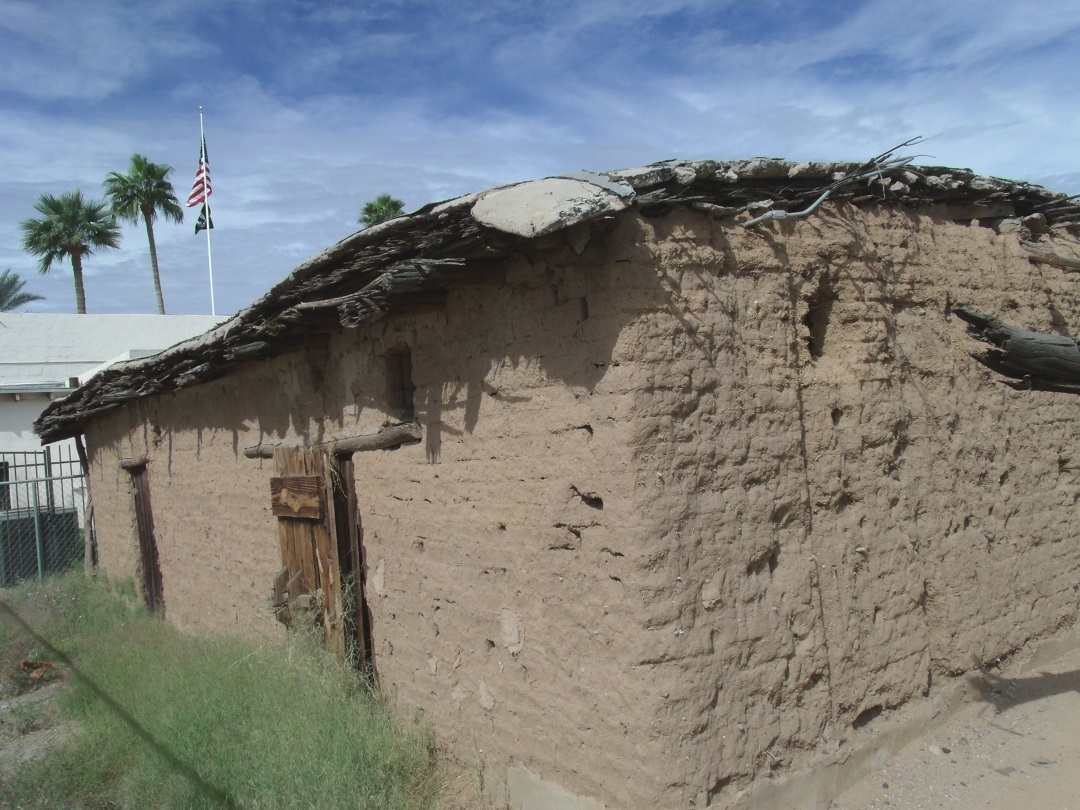
The Phillip Darrell Duppa adobe house was built in 1870 and is the oldest house in Phoenix. The homestead is named after "Lord" Darrell Duppa, an Englishman who is credited with naming Phoenix and Tempe as well as founding the town of New River.

The history of Phoenix begins with Jack Swilling, a Confederate veteran of the Civil War who prospected in the nearby mining town of Wickenburg in the newly formed Arizona Territory. As he traveled through the Salt River Valley in 1867, he saw a potential for farming to supply Wickenburg with food. He also noted the eroded mounds of dirt that indicated previous canals dug by native peoples who had long since left the area. He formed the Swilling Irrigation and Canal Company that year, dug a large canal that drew in river water, and erected several crop fields in a location that is now within the eastern portion of central Phoenix near its airport. Other settlers soon began to arrive, appreciating the area's fertile soil and lack of frost, and the farmhouse Swilling constructed became a frequently visited location in the valley. Lord Darrell Duppa was one of the original settlers in Swilling's party, and he suggested the name "Phoenix", as it described a city born from the ruins of a former civilization.

The board of supervisors in Yavapai County officially recognized the new town on May 4, 1868, and the first post office was established the following month with Swilling as the postmaster. In October 1870, valley residents met to select a new townsite for the valley's growing population. A new location three miles to the west of the original settlement, containing several allotments of farmland, was chosen, and lots began to officially be sold under the name of Phoenix in December of that year. This established the downtown core in a grid layout pattern that has been the hallmark of Phoenix's urban development ever since.

On February 12, 1871, the territorial legislature created Maricopa County by dividing Yavapai County; it was the sixth one formed in the Arizona Territory. The first election for county office was held in 1871 when Tom Barnum was elected the first sheriff. He ran unopposed when the other two candidates (John A. Chenowth and Jim Favorite) fought a duel; Chenowth killed Favorite and was forced to withdraw from the race.

The town grew during the 1870s, and President Ulysses S. Grant issued a land patent for the site of Phoenix on April 10, 1874. By 1875, the town had a telegraph office, 16 saloons, and four dance halls, but the townsite-commissioner form of government needed an overhaul. An election was held in 1875, and three village trustees and other officials were elected. By 1880, the town's population stood at 2,453.

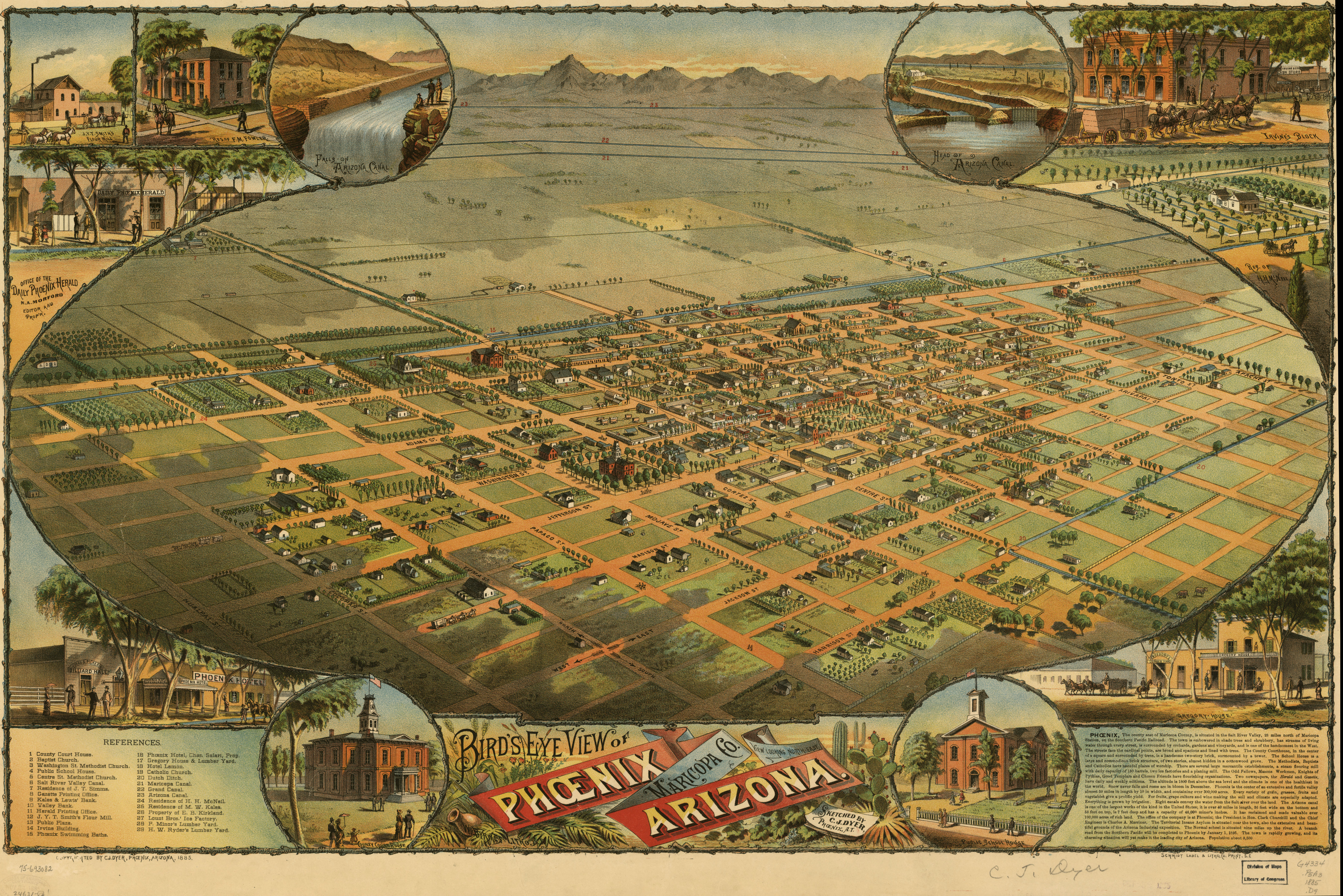
Aerial lithograph of Phoenix from 1885

By 1881, Phoenix's continued growth made the board of trustees obsolete. The Territorial Legislature passed the Phoenix Charter Bill, incorporating Phoenix and providing a mayor-council government; Governor John C. Fremont signed the bill on February 25, 1881, officially incorporating Phoenix as a city with a population of around 2,500.

The railroad's arrival in the valley in the 1880s was the first of several events that made Phoenix a trade center whose products reached eastern and western markets. In response, the Phoenix Chamber of Commerce was organized on November 4, 1888. The city offices moved into the new City Hall at Washington and Central in 1888. The territorial capital moved from Prescott to Phoenix in 1889, and the territorial offices were also in City Hall. The arrival of the Santa Fe, Prescott and Phoenix Railway in 1895 connected Phoenix to Prescott, Flagstaff, and other communities in the northern part of the territory. The increased access to commerce expedited the city's economic rise. The Phoenix Union High School was established in 1895 with an enrollment of 90.

=== 1901 to World War II ===
Central Avenue, Phoenix, 1908

On February 25, 1901, Governor Oakes Murphy dedicated the permanent Capitol building, and the Carnegie Free Library opened seven years later, on February 18, 1908, dedicated by Benjamin Fowler. The National Reclamation Act was signed by President Theodore Roosevelt in 1902, which allowed dams to be built on waterways in the west for reclamation purposes. The first dam constructed under the act, Salt River Dam#1, began in 1903. It supplied both water and electricity, becoming the first multi-purpose dam, and Roosevelt attended the official dedication on May 18, 1911. At the time, it was the largest masonry dam in the world, forming a lake in the mountains east of Phoenix. The dam would be renamed after Teddy Roosevelt in 1917, and the lake would follow suit in 1959.

On February 14, 1912, Phoenix became a state capital, as Arizona was admitted to the Union as the 48th state under President William Howard Taft. This occurred just six months after Taft had vetoed a joint congressional resolution granting statehood to Arizona, due to his disapproval of the state constitution's position on the recall of judges. In 1913, Phoenix's move from a mayor-council system to council-manager made it one of the first cities in the United States with this form of city government. After statehood, Phoenix's growth started to accelerate; eight years later, its population reached 29,053. In 1920, Phoenix would see its first skyscraper, the Heard Building; it was the tallest building in the state until the completion of the Luhrs Building in 1924. In 1929, Sky Harbor was officially opened, at the time owned by Scenic Airways. The city purchased it in 1935 and continues to operate it today.

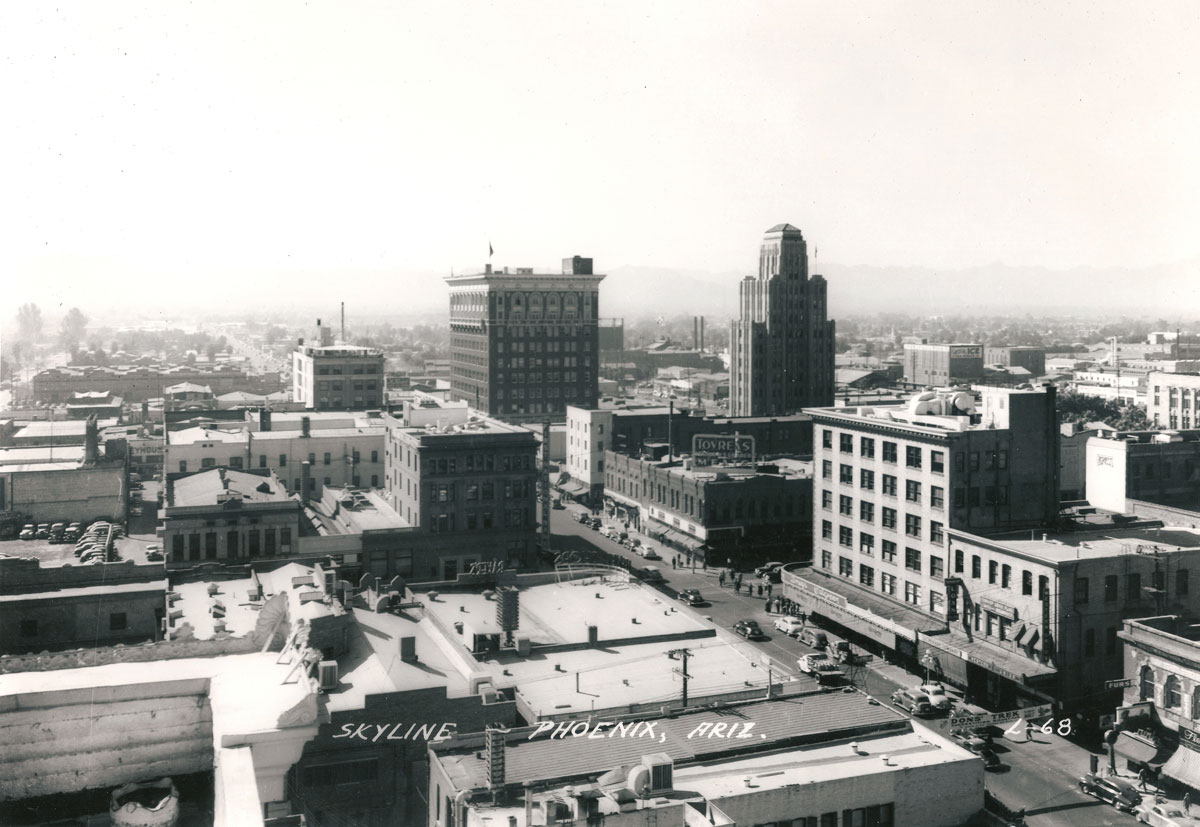
Phoenix skyline, c. 1940

On March 4, 1930, former U.S. President Calvin Coolidge dedicated a dam on the Gila River named in his honor. However, the state had just been through a long drought, and the reservoir which was supposed to be behind the dam was virtually dry. The humorist Will Rogers, who was on hand as a guest speaker joked, "If that was my lake, I'd mow it." Phoenix's population had nearly doubled during the 1920s and by 1930 stood at 48,118. It was also during the 1930s that Phoenix and its surrounding area began to be called "The Valley of the Sun", which was an advertising slogan invented to boost tourism.

During World War II, Phoenix's economy shifted to that of a distribution center, transforming into an "embryonic industrial city" with the mass production of military supplies. There were three air force fields in the area: Luke Field, Williams Field, and Falcon Field, as well as two large pilot training camps, Thunderbird Field No. 1 in Glendale and Thunderbird Field No. 2 in Scottsdale.

=== Post-World War II explosive growth ===
A town that had just over 65,000 residents in 1940 became America's fifth most populous city by 2020, with a population of nearly 1.6 million, and millions more in nearby suburbs. After the war, many of the men who had undergone their training in Arizona returned with their new families. Learning of this large untapped labor pool enticed many large industries to move their operations to the area. In 1948, high-tech industry, which would become a staple of the state's economy, arrived in Phoenix when Motorola chose Phoenix as the site of its new research and development center for military electronics. Seeing the same advantages as Motorola, other high-tech companies, such as Intel and McDonnell Douglas, moved into the valley and opened manufacturing operations.

By 1950, over 105,000 people resided in the city and thousands more in surrounding communities. The 1950s growth was spurred on by advances in air conditioning, which allowed homes and businesses to offset the extreme heat experienced in Phoenix and the surrounding areas during its long summers. There was more new construction in Phoenix in 1959 alone than from 1914 to 1946.

Like many emerging American cities at the time, Phoenix's spectacular growth did not occur evenly. It largely took place on the city's north side, a region that was nearly all Caucasian. In 1962, one local activist testified at a US Commission on Civil Rights of hearing that of 31,000 homes that had recently sprung up in this neighborhood, not a single one had been sold to an African-American. Phoenix's African-American and Mexican-American communities remained largely sequestered on the south side of town. The color lines were so rigid that no one north of Van Buren Street would rent to the African-American baseball star Willie Mays, in town for spring training in the 1960s. In 1964, a reporter from The New Republic wrote of segregation in these terms: "Apartheid is complete. The two cities look at each other across a golf course."

=== 1960s to present ===
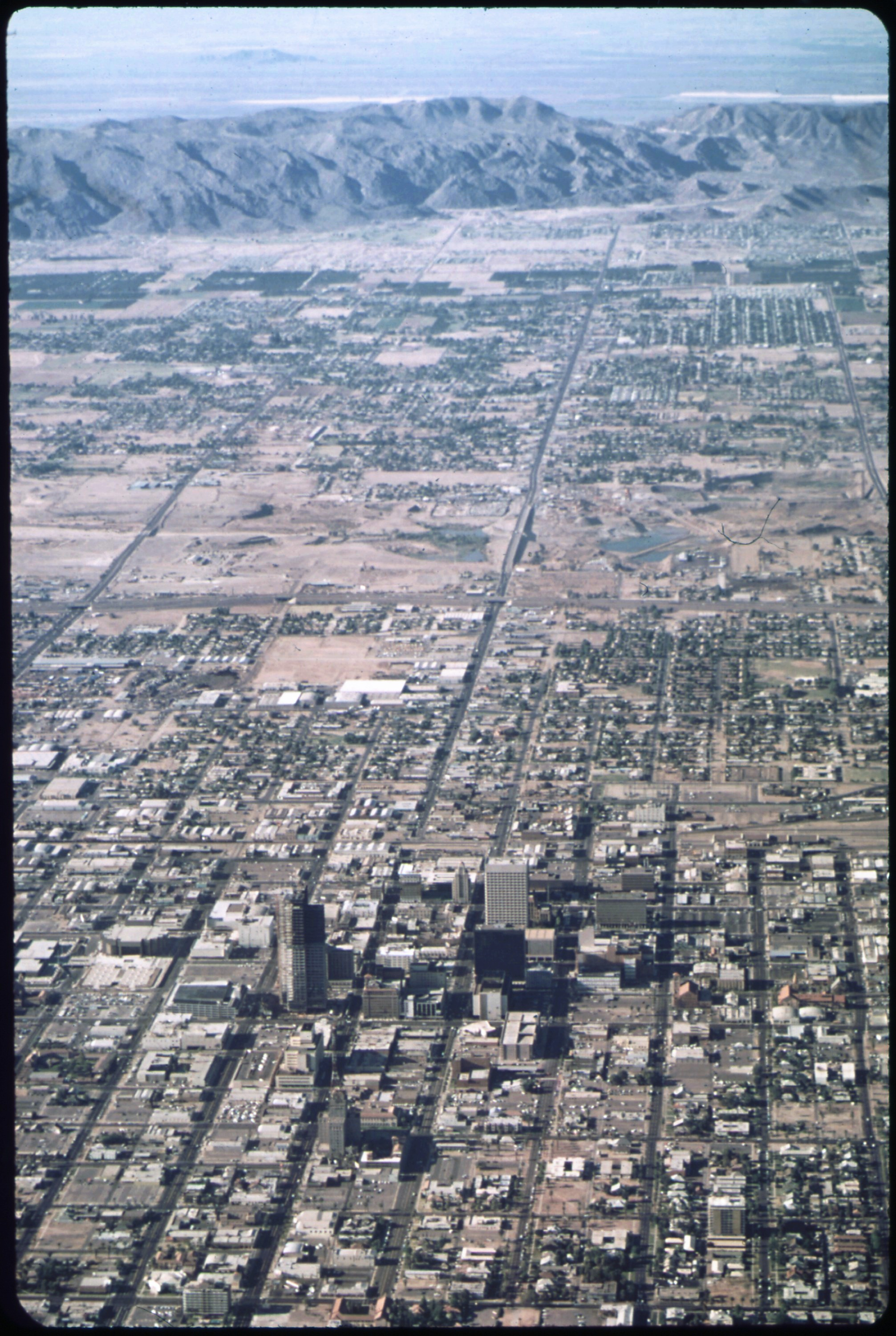
Phoenix in May 1972, with South Mountain in the background

The continued rapid population growth led more businesses to the valley to take advantage of the labor pool, and manufacturing, particularly in the electronics sector, continued to grow. The convention and tourism industries saw rapid expansion during the 1960s, with tourism becoming the third largest industry by the end of the decade. In 1965, the Phoenix Corporate Center opened; at the time it was the tallest building in Arizona, topping off at 341 feet. The 1960s saw many other buildings constructed as the city expanded rapidly, including the Rosenzweig Center (1964), today called Phoenix City Square, the landmark Phoenix Financial Center (1964), as well as many of Phoenix's residential high-rises. In 1965 the Arizona Veterans Memorial Coliseum opened at the Arizona State Fairgrounds, west of downtown. When Phoenix was awarded an NBA franchise in 1968, which would be called the Phoenix Suns, they played their home games at the Coliseum until 1992, after which they moved to America West Arena. In 1968, President Lyndon B. Johnson approved the Central Arizona Project, assuring future water supplies for Phoenix, Tucson, and the agricultural corridor between them. The following year, Pope Paul VI created the Diocese of Phoenix on December 2, by splitting the Archdiocese of Tucson, with Edward A. McCarthy as the first Bishop.

In the 1970s, the downtown area experienced a resurgence, with a level of construction activity not seen again until the urban real estate boom of the 2000s. By the end of the decade, Phoenix adopted the Phoenix Concept 2000 plan which split the city into urban villages, each with its own village core where greater height and density was permitted, further shaping the free-market development culture. The nine original villages have expanded to 15 over the years (see Cityscape below). This officially turned Phoenix into a city of many nodes, which would later be connected by freeways. The Phoenix Symphony Hall opened in 1972; other major structures which saw construction downtown during this decade were the First National Bank Plaza, the Valley Center (the tallest building in Arizona), and the Arizona Bank building.

On September 25, 1981, Phoenix resident Sandra Day O'Connor broke the gender barrier on the U.S. Supreme Court, when she was sworn in as the first female justice. In 1985, the Palo Verde Nuclear Generating Station, the nation's largest nuclear power plant, began electrical production. Pope John Paul II and Mother Teresa both visited the Valley in 1987.

There was an influx of refugees due to low-cost housing in the Sunnyslope area in the 1990s, resulting in 43 different languages being spoken in local schools by 2000. The new 20-story City Hall opened in 1992.

Phoenix maintained a growth streak in the early 2000s, growing by 24.2% before 2007. In 2008, Squaw Peak, the city's second tallest mountain, was renamed Piestewa Peak after Army Specialist Lori Ann Piestewa, an Arizonan and the first Native American woman to die in combat while serving in the U.S. military, as well as being the first American female casualty of the 2003 Iraq War. 2008 also saw Phoenix as one of the cities hardest hit by the subprime mortgage crisis, and by early 2009 the median home price was $150,000, down from its $262,000 peak in 2007. Violent rates in Phoenix have been falling since 2023, and once troubled, decaying neighborhoods such as South Mountain, Alhambra, and Maryvale have recovered and stabilized. On June 1, 2023, the State of Arizona announced the decision to halt new housing development in the Phoenix metropolitan area that relies solely on groundwater due to a predicted water shortfall.

== Geography ==
Sentinel-2 satellite image of the Phoenix metro area in 2020

Phoenix is in the south-central portion of Arizona; about halfway between Tucson to the southeast and Flagstaff to the north, in the Southwestern United States. By car, Phoenix is approximately 150 miles (240 kilometers) north of the US–Mexico border at Sonoyta and 180 mi (290 km) north of the border at Nogales. The metropolitan area is known as the "Valley of the Sun" due to its location in the Salt River Valley. It lies at a mean elevation of 1,086 feet (331 m), in the northern reaches of the Sonoran Desert.

Other than the mountains in and around the city, Phoenix's topography is generally flat, which allows the city's main streets to run on a precise grid with wide, open-spaced roadways. Scattered, low mountain ranges surround the valley: McDowell Mountains to the northeast, the White Tank Mountains to the west, the Superstition Mountains far to the east, and both South Mountain and the Sierra Estrella to the south/southwest. Camelback Mountain, North Mountain, Sunnyslope Mountain, and Piestewa Peak are within the heart of the valley. The city's outskirts have large fields of irrigated cropland and Native American reservation lands. The Salt River runs westward through Phoenix, but the riverbed is often dry or contains little water due to large irrigation diversions. South Mountain separates the community of Ahwatukee from the rest of the city.

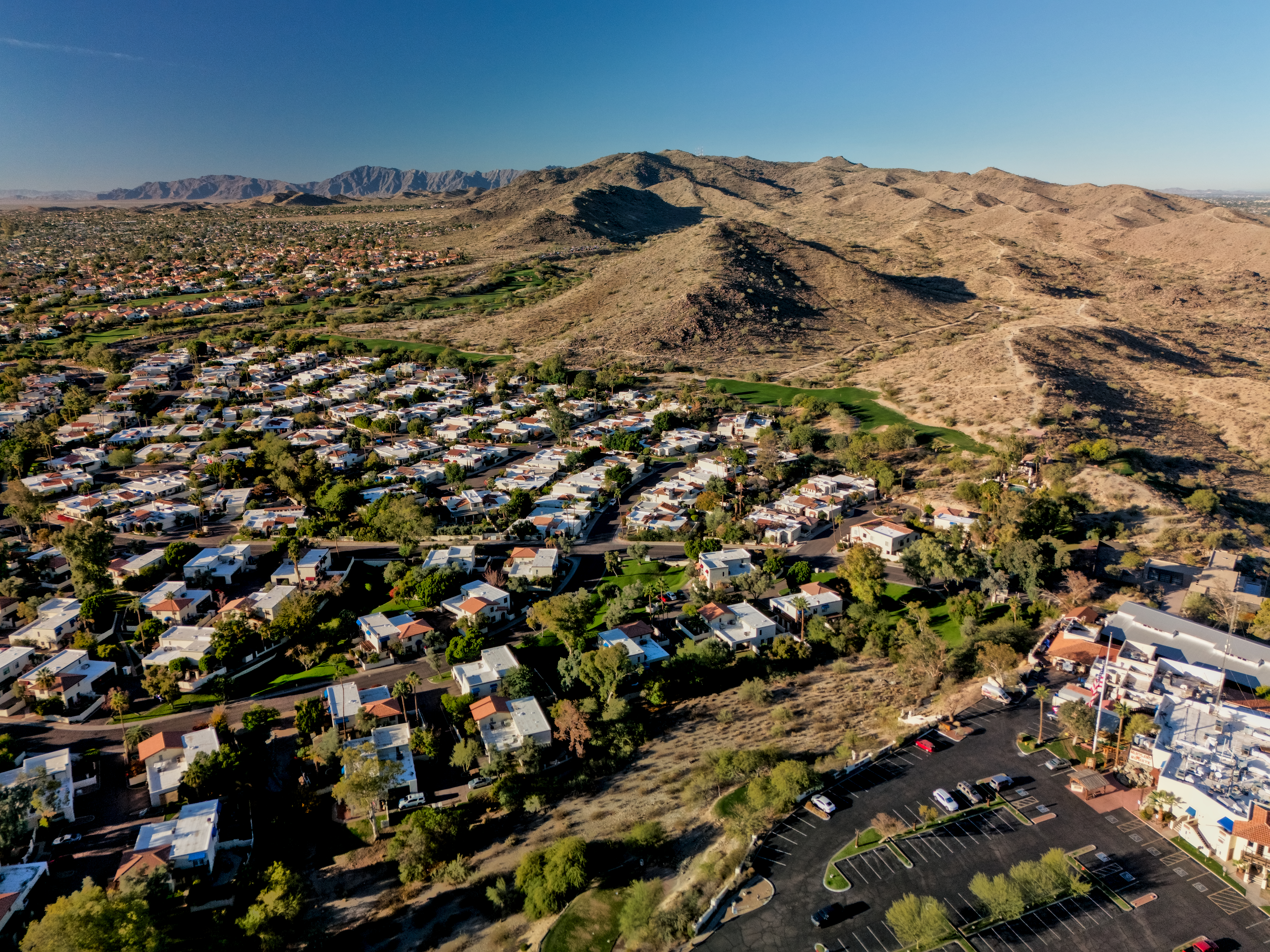
Aerial view of Ahwatukee neighborhoods and the South Mountains

According to the United States Census Bureau, the city has an area of 517.9 square miles (1,341 km^{2}), of which 516.7 square miles (1,338 km^{2}) is land and 1.2 square miles (3.1 km^{2}), or 0.2%, is water.

Maricopa County grew by 711% from 186,000 in 1940 to 1,509,000 by 1980, due in part to air conditioning, cheap housing, and an influx of retirees. The once "modest urban sprawl" now "grew by 'epic' proportions—not only a myriad of residential tract developments on both farmland and desert". Retail outlets and office complexes spread out and did not concentrate in the small downtown area. There was low population density and a lack of widespread and significant high-rise development. As a consequence Phoenix became a textbook case of urban sprawl for geographers. Even though it is the fifth-most populated city in the United States, the large area gives it a low density rate of approximately 1,080 people per square kilometer (2,797 people per square mile). In comparison, Philadelphia, the sixth-most populous city with nearly the same population as Phoenix, has a density of over 4,247 people per square kilometer (11,000 people per square mile).

Like most of Arizona, Phoenix does not observe daylight saving time. In 1973, Governor Jack Williams argued to the U.S. Congress that energy use would increase in the evening should Arizona observe DST. He went on to say energy use would also rise early in the day "because there would be more lights on in the early morning." Additionally, he said daylight saving time would cause children to go to school in the dark.

=== Cityscape ===
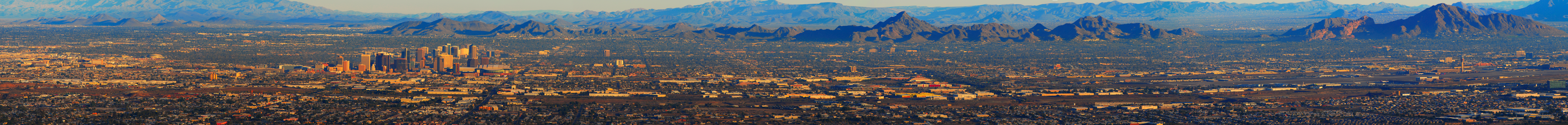
A panoramic view of Phoenix from the South Mountain range, winter 2008, with Sky Harbor International Airport on the far right

==== Neighborhoods ====
Map of the urban villages of Phoenix

Since 1979, the city of Phoenix has been divided into urban villages, many of which are based upon historically significant neighborhoods and communities that have since been annexed into Phoenix. Each village has a planning committee appointed directly by the city council. According to the city-issued village planning handbook, the purpose of the village planning committees is to "work with the city's planning commission to ensure a balance of housing and employment in each village, concentrate development at identified village cores, and to promote the unique character and identity of the villages." There are 15 urban villages, all contained within their own particular planning area: Ahwatukee Foothills, Alhambra, Camelback East, Central City, Deer Valley, Desert View, Encanto, Estrella, Laveen, Maryvale, North Gateway, North Mountain, Paradise Valley, Rio Vista, and South Mountain.

The urban village of Paradise Valley is distinct from the nearby Town of Paradise Valley. Although the urban village is part of Phoenix, the town is independent.

In addition to the above urban villages, Phoenix has a variety of commonly referred-to regions and districts, such as Downtown, Midtown, Uptown, Melrose District, West Phoenix, North Phoenix, South Phoenix, Biltmore Area, Arcadia, and Sunnyslope.

=== Flora and fauna ===
While some of the native flora and fauna of the Sonoran Desert can be found within Phoenix city limits, most are found in the suburbs and the undeveloped desert areas that surround the city. Native mammal species include coyote, javelina, bobcat, mountain lion, desert cottontail rabbit, jackrabbit, antelope ground squirrel, mule deer, ringtail, coati, and multiple species of bats, such as the Mexican free-tailed bat and western pipistrelle, that roost in and around the city. There are many species of native birds, including Costa's hummingbird, Anna's hummingbird, Gambel's quail, Gila woodpecker, mourning dove, white-winged dove, the greater roadrunner, the cactus wren, and many species of raptors, including falcons, hawks, owls, vultures (such as the turkey vulture and black vulture), and eagles, including the golden and the bald eagle.

The greater Phoenix region is home to the only thriving feral population of rosy-faced lovebirds in the U.S. This bird is a popular birdcage pet, native to southwestern Africa. Feral birds were first observed living outdoors in 1987, probably escaped or released pets, and by 2010 the Greater Phoenix population had grown to about 950 birds. These lovebirds prefer older neighborhoods where they nest under untrimmed, dead palm tree fronds.

The area is also home to a plethora of native reptile species including the Western diamondback rattlesnake, Sonoran sidewinder, several other types of rattlesnakes, Sonoran coral snake, dozens of species of non-venomous snakes (including the Sonoran gopher snake and the California kingsnake), the gila monster, desert spiny lizard, several types of whiptail lizards, the chuckwalla, desert horned lizard, western banded gecko, Sonora mud turtle, and the desert tortoise. Native amphibian species include the Couch's spadefoot toad, Chiricahua leopard frog, and the Sonoran desert toad.

Phoenix and the surrounding areas are also home to a wide variety of native invertebrates including the Arizona bark scorpion, giant desert hairy scorpion, Arizona blond tarantula, Sonoran Desert centipede, tarantula hawk wasp, camel spider, and tailless whip scorpion. Of great concern is the presence of Africanized bees which can be extremely dangerous—even lethal—when provoked.

The Arizona Upland subdivision of the Sonoran Desert (of which Phoenix is a part) has "the most structurally diverse flora in the United States." One of the most well-known types of succulents, the giant saguaro cactus, is found throughout the city and its neighboring environs. Other native species are the organpipe, barrel, fishhook, senita, prickly pear and cholla cacti; ocotillo; Palo Verde trees and foothill and blue paloverde; California fan palm; agaves; soaptree yucca, Spanish bayonet, desert spoon, and red yucca; ironwood; mesquite; and the creosote bush.

Many non-native plants also thrive in Phoenix including, but not limited to, the date palm, Mexican fan palm, pineapple palm, Afghan pine, Canary Island pine, Mexican fencepost cactus, cardon cactus, acacia, eucalyptus, aloe, bougainvillea, oleander, lantana, bottlebrush, olive, citrus, and red bird of paradise.

=== Climate ===
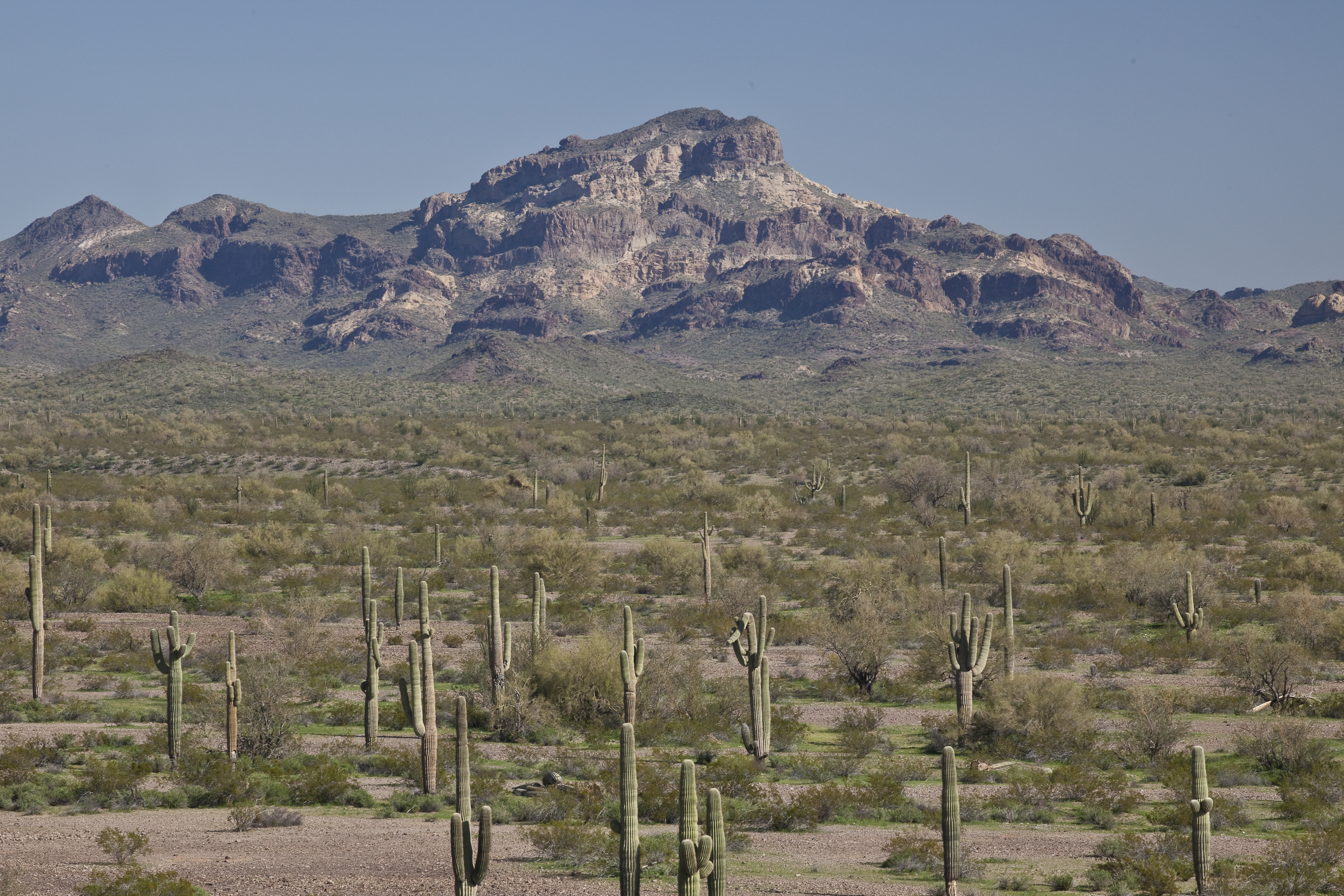
The Sonoran Desert surrounding Phoenix

Phoenix has a hot desert climate (Köppen: BWh), typical of the Sonoran Desert, and is the largest city in the Americas in this climatic zone. Phoenix has long, extremely hot summers and short, mild winters. The city is within one of the world's sunniest regions, with its sunshine duration comparable to the Sahara region. With 3,872 hours of bright sunshine annually, Phoenix receives the most sunshine of any major city on Earth. Average high temperatures in summer are the hottest of any major city in the United States. On average, there are 111 days annually with a high of at least 100 °F (38 °C), including most days from the end of May through late September. Highs top 110 °F (43 °C) an average of 21 days during the year. On June 26, 1990, the temperature reached an all-time recorded high of 122 °F (50 °C). The annual minimum temperature in Phoenix is in the mid-to-low 30s. It rarely drops to 32 °F (0 °C) or below. Snow is rare.

In July 2023, Phoenix became the first major city in the US to have an average monthly temperature of over 100 °F (38 °C) with an average daily mean temperature for the month at 102.7 °F (39 °C), which is also the hottest month ever recorded in the city. That same month the city had an unprecedented streak of 31 days with 110 °F (43 °C)+ highs that lasted from June 30 to July 30. That year the city also had a record 55 days of daily highs topping 110 °F (43 °C)+, which also made summer of 2023 the hottest on record there, until it was beaten by the summer of 2024 with the hottest ever June at 97.0 °F (36 °C), the third hottest August at 98.7 °F (37 °C) and the 2nd hottest July record at 101.1 °F (38 °C) by average daily temperature respectively. That same year in 2024, it also recorded an unprecedented 113 day streak of daily highs topping 100 °F (38 °C)+ that lasted from May 27 to September 16 and ultimately recorded a record 70 110 °F (43 °C) days in a single year, ending by October 7. Because extreme heat is so common, nearly all homes in Phoenix have air conditioning, though poorer residents may not be able to afford to repair or operate them when needed.

Maricopa County, which includes Phoenix, was ranked seventh for most ozone pollution in the United States according to the American Lung Association. Vehicle emissions are cited as precursors to ozone formation. Phoenix also has high levels of particulate pollution; although cities in California lead the nation in this hazard. PM2.5 particulate matter, which is a component of diesel engine exhaust, and larger PM10 particles, which can come from dust, can both reach concerning levels in Phoenix. In fact, people, pets, and other animals exposed to high concentrations of PM10 dust particles―primarily from dust storms or from disturbed agricultural or construction sites―are at risk of contracting Valley Fever, a fungal lung infection.

Unlike most desert locations which have drastic fluctuations between day and nighttime temperatures, the urban heat island effect limits Phoenix's diurnal temperature variation. As the city has expanded, average summer low temperatures have been steadily rising. Pavement, sidewalks, and buildings store the Sun's heat and radiate it at night. The daily normal low remains at or above 80 °F (27 °C) for an average of 74 days per summer. On July 19, 2023, at the height of an unprecedented heatwave that caused daily highs to top 110 °F (43 °C) or higher that lasted for 31 days straight, Phoenix set its record for the warmest daily low temperature, at 97 °F (36 °C).

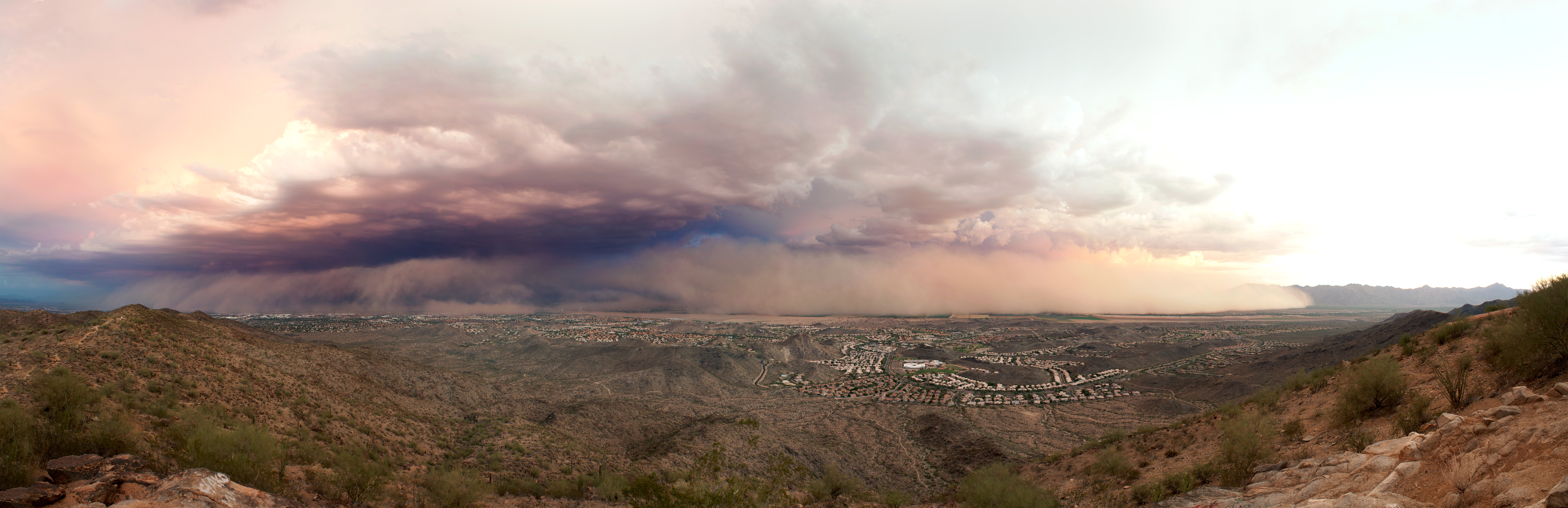
A 2011 haboob

The city averages approximately 300 days of sunshine, or over 85% of daylight hours, per year, and receives scant rainfall―the average annual total at Phoenix Sky Harbor International Airport is 7.22 in (183 mm). The region's trademark dry and sunny weather is interrupted by sporadic Pacific storms in the winter and the arrival of the North American monsoon in the summer. Historically, the monsoon officially started when the average dew point was 55 °F (13 °C) for three days in a row—typically occurring in early July. To increase monsoon awareness and promote safety, however, the National Weather Service decreed that starting in 2008, June 15 would be the official "first day" of the monsoon, and it would end on September 30. When active, the monsoon raises humidity levels and can cause heavy localized precipitation, flash floods, hail, destructive winds, and dust storms—which can rise to the level of a haboob in some years.

Climate data for Phoenix Int'l, Arizona (1991–2020 normals, (Note: Mean monthly maxima and minima (i.e. the highest and lowest temperature readings during an entire month or year) calculated based on data at said location from 1991 to 2020.) extremes 1895–present) (Note: Official records for Phoenix kept at downtown August 1895 to September 1953, and at Sky Harbor Int'l since October 1953. For more information see ThreadEx.)
Month	Jan	Feb	Mar	Apr	May	Jun	Jul	Aug	Sep	Oct	Nov	Dec	Year
Record high °F (°C)	88 (31)	92 (33)	105 (41)	105 (41)	114 (46)	122 (50)	121 (49)	118 (48)	117 (47)	113 (45)	99 (37)	88 (31)	122 (50)
Mean maximum °F (°C)	78.2 (25.7)	82.1 (27.8)	90.4 (32.4)	99.0 (37.2)	105.7 (40.9)	112.7 (44.8)	114.6 (45.9)	113.2 (45.1)	108.9 (42.7)	100.7 (38.2)	88.9 (31.6)	77.7 (25.4)	115.7 (46.5)
Mean daily maximum °F (°C)	67.6 (19.8)	70.8 (21.6)	78.1 (25.6)	85.5 (29.7)	94.5 (34.7)	104.2 (40.1)	106.5 (41.4)	105.1 (40.6)	100.4 (38.0)	89.2 (31.8)	76.5 (24.7)	66.2 (19.0)	87.1 (30.6)
Daily mean °F (°C)	56.8 (13.8)	59.9 (15.5)	66.3 (19.1)	73.2 (22.9)	82.0 (27.8)	91.4 (33.0)	95.5 (35.3)	94.4 (34.7)	89.2 (31.8)	77.4 (25.2)	65.1 (18.4)	55.8 (13.2)	75.6 (24.2)
Mean daily minimum °F (°C)	46.0 (7.8)	49.0 (9.4)	54.5 (12.5)	60.8 (16.0)	69.5 (20.8)	78.6 (25.9)	84.5 (29.2)	83.6 (28.7)	78.1 (25.6)	65.6 (18.7)	53.7 (12.1)	45.3 (7.4)	64.1 (17.8)
Mean minimum °F (°C)	36.0 (2.2)	40.0 (4.4)	44.4 (6.9)	50.1 (10.1)	58.4 (14.7)	69.4 (20.8)	74.4 (23.6)	74.2 (23.4)	68.3 (20.2)	53.8 (12.1)	42.0 (5.6)	35.4 (1.9)	33.8 (1.0)
Record low °F (°C)	16 (−9)	24 (−4)	25 (−4)	35 (2)	39 (4)	49 (9)	63 (17)	58 (14)	47 (8)	34 (1)	27 (−3)	22 (−6)	16 (−9)
Average precipitation inches (mm)	0.87 (22)	0.87 (22)	0.83 (21)	0.22 (5.6)	0.13 (3.3)	0.02 (0.51)	0.91 (23)	0.93 (24)	0.57 (14)	0.56 (14)	0.57 (14)	0.74 (19)	7.22 (183)
Average precipitation days (≥ 0.01 in)	3.8	4.1	3.1	1.5	1.0	0.5	3.9	4.6	2.5	2.2	2.2	4.0	33.4
Average relative humidity (%)	50.9	44.4	39.3	27.8	21.9	19.4	31.6	36.2	35.6	36.9	43.8	51.8	36.6
Average dew point °F (°C)	32.4 (0.2)	32.2 (0.1)	32.9 (0.5)	31.6 (−0.2)	34.3 (1.3)	39.0 (3.9)	56.1 (13.4)	58.3 (14.6)	52.3 (11.3)	43.0 (6.1)	35.8 (2.1)	33.1 (0.6)	40.1 (4.5)
Mean monthly sunshine hours	256.0	257.2	318.4	353.6	401.0	407.8	378.5	360.8	328.6	308.9	256.0	244.8	3,871.6
Percentage possible sunshine	81	84	86	90	93	95	86	87	89	88	82	79	87
Average ultraviolet index	3.1	4.4	6.6	8.5	9.7	10.9	11.0	10.1	8.3	5.6	3.7	2.7	7.0
Source 1: NOAA (dew points, relative humidity, and sun 1961–1990), Weather.com
Source 2: UV Index Today (1995 to 2022)

== Demographics ==
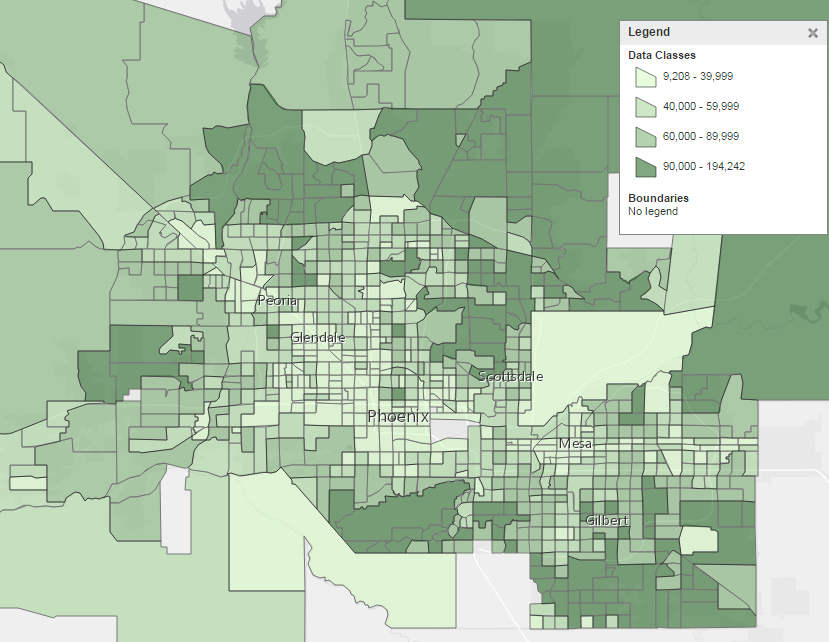
Median household income across metro Phoenix; the darker the green, the higher the income.

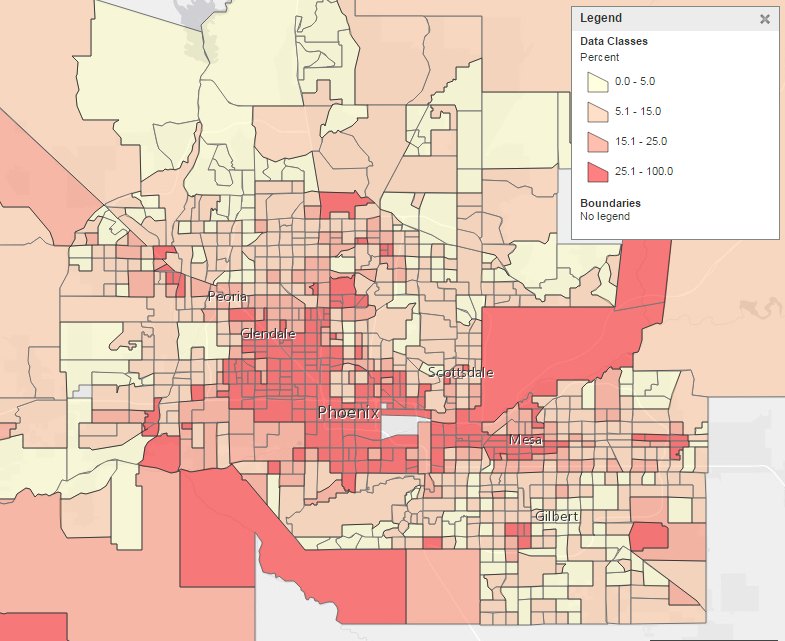
Percent of people living in poverty across metro Phoenix; the darker the red, the higher the concentration of poverty.

Historical population
Census	Pop.	Note	%±
1870	240		—
1880	1,708		611.7%
1890	3,152		84.5%
1900	5,544		75.9%
1910	11,314		104.1%
1920	29,053		156.8%
1930	48,118		65.6%
1940	65,414		35.9%
1950	106,818		63.3%
1960	439,170		311.1%
1970	581,572		32.4%
1980	789,704		35.8%
1990	983,403		24.5%
2000	1,321,045		34.3%
2010	1,445,632		9.4%
2020	1,608,139		11.2%
2025 (est.)	1,665,481	▲	3.6%
U.S. Decennial Census; 2010–2020

As of 2020, Phoenix was the fifth most populous city in the United States, with the census bureau placing its population at 1,608,139, edging out Philadelphia with a population of 1,567,872. In the aftermath of the Great Recession, Phoenix had a population of 1,445,632 according to the 2010 United States census, the sixth largest city and still the most populous state capital in the United States. Prior to the Great Recession, in 2006, Phoenix's population was 1,512,986, the fifth largest just ahead of Philadelphia.

After leading the U.S. in population growth for over a decade, the sub-prime mortgage crisis, followed by the recession, led to a slowing in the growth of Phoenix. There were approximately 77,000 people added to the population of the Phoenix metropolitan area in 2009, which was down significantly from its peak in 2006 of 162,000. Despite this slowing, Phoenix's population grew by 9.4% since the 2000 census (a total of 124,000 people), while the entire Phoenix metropolitan area grew by 28.9% during the same period. This compares with an overall growth rate nationally during the same time frame of 9.7%. Not since 1940–50, when the city had a population of 107,000, had the city gained less than 124,000 in a decade. Phoenix's recent growth rate of 9.4% from the 2010 census is the first time it has recorded a growth rate under 24% in a census decade. However, in 2016, Phoenix once again became the fastest growing city in the United States, adding approximately 88 people per day during the preceding year.

The Phoenix Metropolitan Statistical Area (MSA) (officially known as the Phoenix-Mesa-Chandler MSA), is one of 10 MSAs in Arizona, and was the 11th largest in the United States, with a 2018 U.S. census population estimate of 4,857,962, up from the 2010 census population of 4,192,887. Consisting of both Pinal and Maricopa counties, the MSA accounts for 65.5% of Arizona's population. Phoenix only contributed 13% to the total growth rate of the MSA, down significantly from its 33% share during the prior decade. Phoenix is also part of the Arizona Sun Corridor megaregion (MR), which is the tenth most populous of the 11 MRs, and the eighth largest by area. It had the second largest growth by percentage of the MRs (behind only the Gulf Coast MR) between 2000 and 2010.

The population is almost equally split between men and women, with men making up 50.2% of city's citizens. The population density is 2,797.8 people per square mile, and the city's median age is 32.2 years, with only 10.9 of the population being over 62. 98.5% of Phoenix's population lives in households with an average household size of 2.77 people.

There were 514,806 total households, with 64.2% of those households consisting of families: 42.3% married couples, 7% with an unmarried male as head of household, and 14.9% with an unmarried female as head of household. 33.6% of those households have children below the age of 18. Of the 35.8% of non-family households, 27.1% have a householder living alone, almost evenly split between men and women, with women having 13.7% and men occupying 13.5%.

As of 2020, Phoenix has 590,149 dwelling units, with an occupancy rate of 87.2%. The largest segment of vacancies is in the rental market, where the vacancy rate is 14.9%, and 51% of all vacancies are in rentals. Vacant houses for sale only make up 17.7% of the vacancies, with the rest being split among vacation properties and other various reasons.

The city's median household income was $47,866, and the median family income was $54,804. Males had a median income of $32,820 versus $27,466 for females. The city's per capita income was $24,110. 21.8% of the population and 17.1% of families were below the poverty line. Of the total population, 31.4% of those under the age of 18 and 10.5% of those 65 and older were living below the poverty line.

=== Ethnicity ===
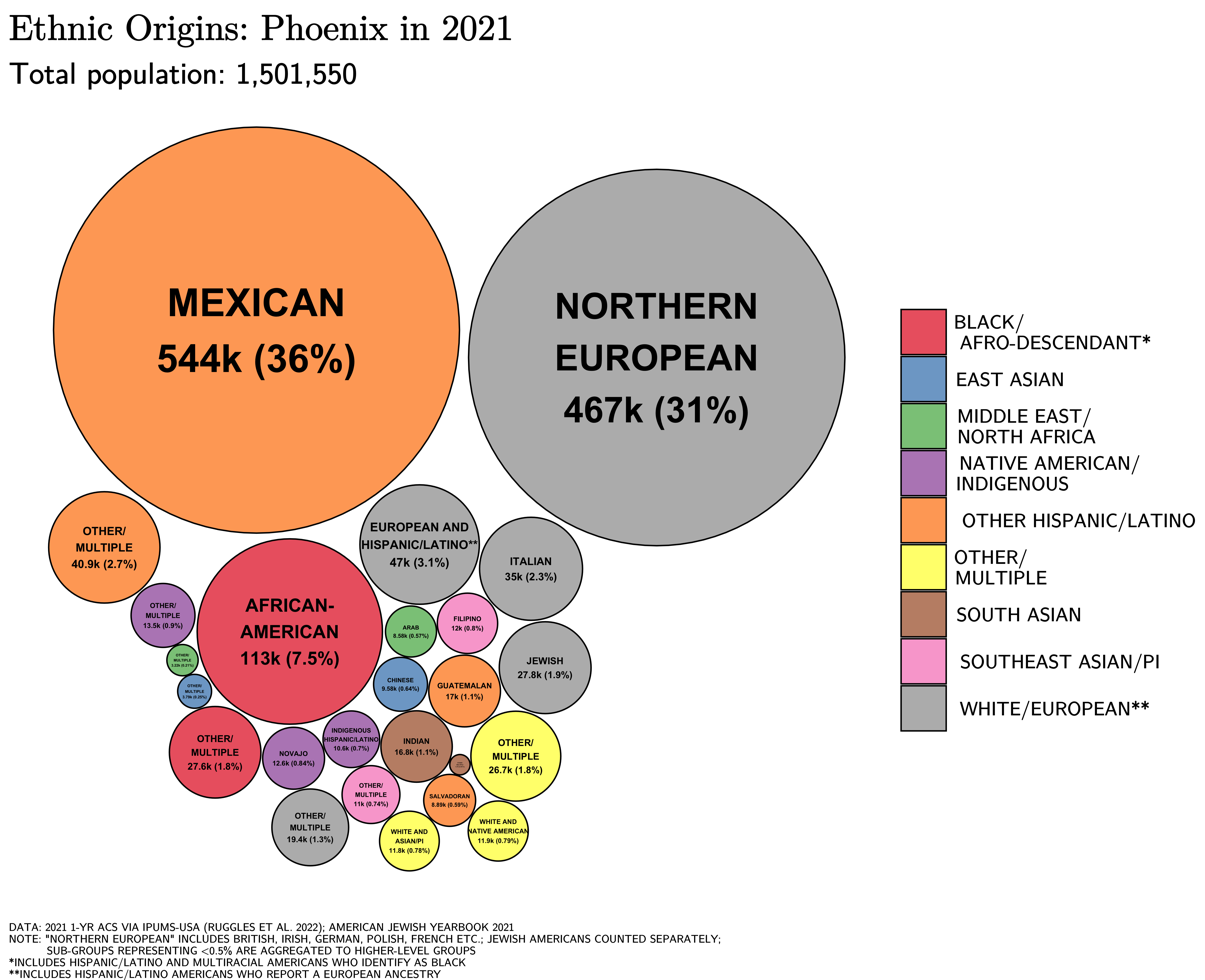
Ethnic origins in Phoenix

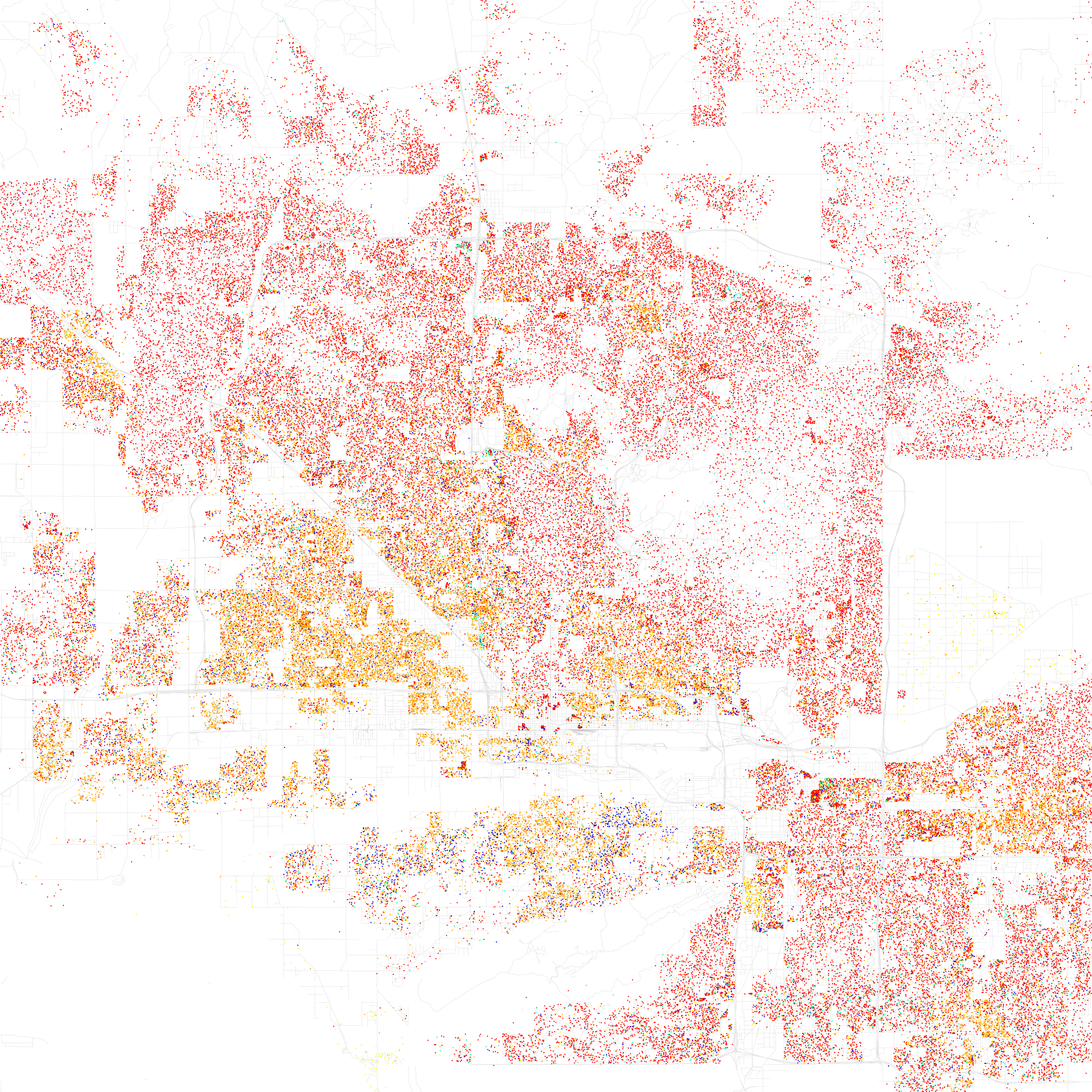
Map of racial distribution in Phoenix, 2010 U.S. census. Each dot is 25 people: ⬤ White ⬤ Black ⬤ Asian ⬤ Hispanic ⬤ Other

Racial composition	1940	1970	1990	2010	2020
White (Non-Hispanic)	n/a	81.3%	71.8%	46.5%	42.2%
Hispanic or Latino	n/a	12.7%	20.0%	40.8%	42.6%
Black or African American	6.5%	4.8%	5.2%	6.0%	7.1%
Asian	0.8%	0.5%	1.7%	3.0%	3.9%
Mixed	n/a	n/a	n/a	1.7%	3.4%

According to the 2020 census, the racial breakdown of Phoenix was as follows:

- White: 49.7% (42.2% non-Hispanic)
- Black or African American: 7.8%
- Native American: 2.6%
- Asian: 4.1%
- Native Hawaiian and Other Pacific Islander: 0.2%
- Other race: 20.1%
- Two or more races: 15.5%
- Hispanic: 41.1%

According to the 2010 census, the racial breakdown of Phoenix was as follows:

- White: 65.9% (46.5% non-Hispanic)
- Black or African American: 6.5% (6.0% non-Hispanic)
- Native American: 2.2%
- Asian: 3.2% (0.8% Indian, 0.5% Filipino, 0.5% Korean, 0.4% Chinese, 0.4% Vietnamese, 0.2% Japanese, 0.2% Thai, 0.1% Burmese)
- Native Hawaiian and Other Pacific Islander: 0.2%
- Other race: 18.5%
- Two or more races: 3.6%

Phoenix's population has historically been predominantly white. From 1890 to 1970, over 90% of the citizens were white. In recent years, this percentage has dropped, reaching 65% in 2010. However, a large part of this decrease can be attributed to new guidelines put out by the U.S. Census Bureau in 1980, when a question regarding Hispanic origin was added to the census questionnaire. This has led to an increasing tendency for some groups to no longer self-identify as white, and instead categorize themselves as "other races".

20.6% of the population of the city was foreign born in 2010. Of the 1,342,803 residents over five years of age, 63.5% spoke only English, 30.6% spoke Spanish at home, 2.5% spoke another Indo-European language, 2.1% spoke Asian or Islander languages, with the remaining 1.4% speaking other languages. About 15.7% of non-English speakers reported speaking English less than "very well". The largest national ancestries reported were Mexican (35.9%), German (15.3%), Irish (10.3%), English (9.4%), Black (6.5%), Italian (4.5%), French (2.7%), Polish (2.5%), American Indian (2.2%), and Scottish (2.0%). Hispanics or Latinos of any race make up 40.8% of the population. Of these the largest groups are at 35.9% Mexican, 0.6% Puerto Rican, 0.5% Guatemalan, 0.3% Salvadoran, 0.3% Cuban.

Phoenix has the largest urban Native American population in Arizona. Phoenix has around 200 Dakota Sioux, approximately 100 Minnesota Chippewas, 100 Kiowas, about 175 Muscogee, 100 Choctaws, several hundred Cherokees, several hundred Pueblos, and smaller numbers of Shawnees, Blackfeet, Pawnees, Cheyennes, Haudenosaunee, Tlingit, Yakimas and other Native Americans from far away states.

Hispanics are now the majority in Phoenix. African Americans, Hispanics, and Native Americans live primarily in the southern portion of Phoenix, below the downtown district.

According to the National Immigration Forum, the majority of Phoenix's immigrants are from Latin America: Mexico (196,941), Guatemala (5.093), El Salvador (2,980); Asia: India (10,128), Philippines (5.756), Vietnam (4,698); Africa: Ethiopia (1,157), Liberia (1,089), Sudan (1,067) and Europe: Bosnia and Herzegovina (2.944), Germany (2,847) and Romania (1,658).

According to a 2014 study by the Pew Research Center, 66% of the population of the city identified themselves as Christians, while 26% claimed no religious affiliation. The same study says other religions (including Judaism, Buddhism, Islam, and Hinduism) collectively make up about 7% of the population. In 2010, according to the Association of Religion Data Archives, which conducts religious census each ten years, 39% of those polled in Maricopa county considered themselves a member of a religious group. Of those who expressed a religious affiliation, the area's religious composition was reported as 35% Catholic, 22% to Evangelical Protestant denominations, 16% Latter-Day Saints (LDS), 14% to nondenominational congregations, 7% to Mainline Protestant denominations, and 2% Hindu. The remaining 4% belong to other religions, such as Buddhism and Judaism.

While the number of religious adherents increased by 103,000 during the decade, the growth did not keep pace with the county's overall population increase of almost three-quarters of million individuals during the same period. The largest aggregate increases were in the LDS (a 58% increase) and Evangelical Protestant churches (14% increase), while all other categories saw their numbers drop slightly or remain static. The Catholic Church had an 8% drop, while mainline Protestant groups saw a 28% decline.

According to the 2022 Point-In-Time Homeless Count, there were 3,096 homeless people in Phoenix.

== Economy ==
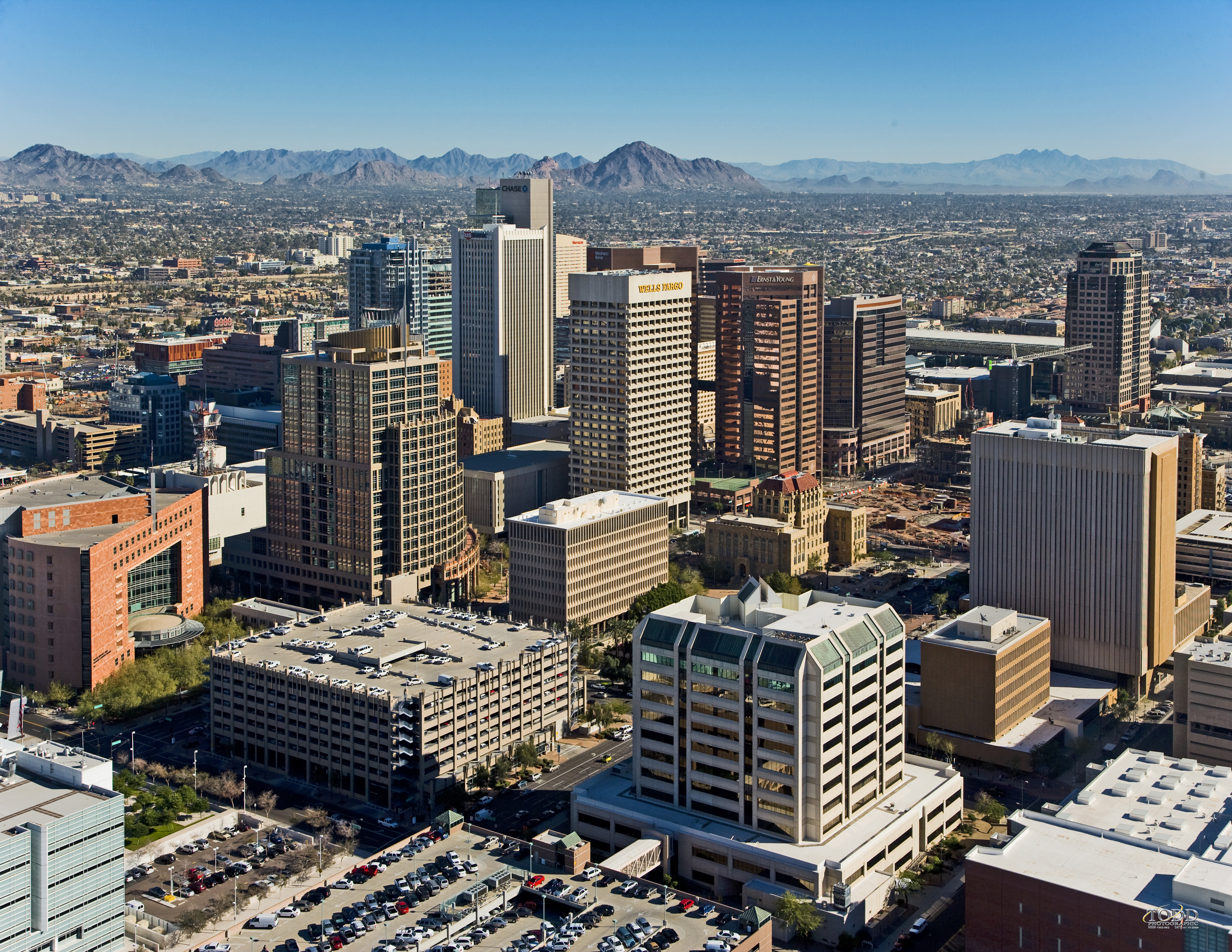
Downtown Phoenix

Phoenix's early economy focused on agriculture and natural resources, especially the "5Cs" of copper, cattle, climate, cotton, and citrus. With the opening of the Union Station in 1923, the establishment of the Southern Pacific rail line in 1926, and the creation of Sky Harbor airport in 1928, the city became more easily accessible. The Great Depression affected Phoenix, but Phoenix had a diverse economy and by 1934 the recovery was underway. At the conclusion of World War II, the valley's economy surged, as many men who had completed their military training at bases in and around Phoenix returned with their families. The construction industry, spurred on by the city's growth, further expanded with the development of Sun City. It became the template for suburban development in post-WWII America, and Sun City became the template for retirement communities when it opened in 1960. The city averaged a four percent annual growth rate over a 40-year period from the mid-1960s to the mid-2000s.

As the subprime mortgage crisis began, construction in Phoenix collapsed and housing prices plunged. Arizona jobs declined by 11.8% from peak to trough; in 2007 Phoenix had 1,918,100 employed individuals, by 2010 that number had shrunk by 226,500 to 1,691,600. By the end of 2015, the employment number in Phoenix had risen to 1.97 million, finally regaining its pre-recession levels, with job growth occurring across the board.

As of 2017, the Phoenix MSA had a Gross Domestic Product (GDP) of just under $243 billion. The top five industries were: real estate ($41.96), finance and insurance ($19.71), manufacturing ($19.91), retail trade ($18.64), and health care ($19.78). Government (including federal, state and local), if it had been a private industry, would have been ranked second on the list, generating $23.37 billion.

In Phoenix, real estate developers face few constraints when planning and developing new projects.

=== Employment ===
As of 2024, Phoenix had a per capita income of $61,840 and an unemployment rate of 3.3%. The top employers were:

Rank	Employer	Employees in 2024	Employees in 2015	2024 share	2015 share
1	Banner Health	▲46,602	35,406	▼1.90%	1.91%
2	State of Arizona	▼41,531	50,816	▼1.69%	2.74%
3	Amazon	▲40,000	-	▲1.63%	-
4	Walmart	▲37,648	32,373	▼1.54%	1.75%
5	Arizona State University	▲37,402	12,676	▲1.53%	0.68%
6	University of Arizona	▲23,439	-	▲0.96%	-
7	Fry's Food Stores	▲21,000	17,286	▼0.86%	0.93%
8	City of Phoenix	▲15,018	14,585	▼0.61%	0.79%
9	HonorHealth	▲14,801	-	▲0.60%	-
10	Wells Fargo	▼13,000	14,480	▼0.53%	0.78%
10	US Postal Service (USPS)	▲13,000	-	▲0.53%	-

Phoenix is home to several Fortune 500 companies, including electronics corporation Avnet, mining company Freeport-McMoRan, retailer PetSmart, and waste hauler Republic Services. Honeywell's Aerospace division is headquartered in Phoenix, and the valley hosts many of their avionics and mechanical facilities. Intel has one of their largest sites in the area, employing about 12,000 employees, the second largest Intel location in the country. The city is also home to the headquarters of U-HAUL International, Best Western, and Apollo Group, parent of the University of Phoenix. Southwest is the largest carrier at Phoenix's Sky Harbor International Airport. Mesa Air Group, a regional airline group, is headquartered in Phoenix.

The U.S. military has a large presence in Phoenix, with Luke Air Force Base in the western suburbs. The city was severely affected by the effects of the sub-prime mortgage crash. However, Phoenix has recovered 83% of the jobs lost due to the recession.

== Arts and culture ==
=== Performing arts ===
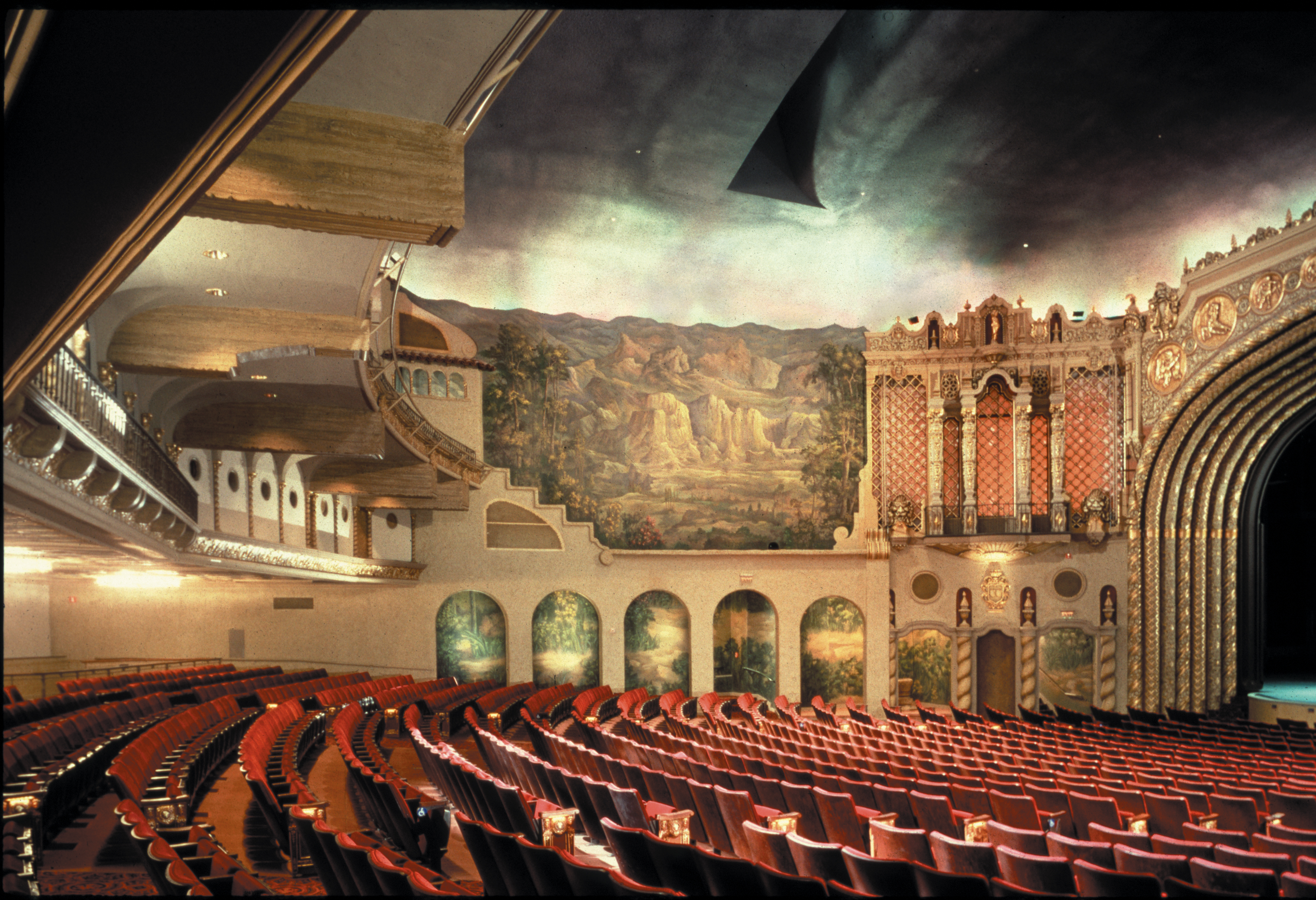
Interior of the Orpheum Theatre

The city has many performing arts venues, most of which are in and around downtown Phoenix or Scottsdale. The Phoenix Symphony Hall is home to the Phoenix Symphony Orchestra, the Arizona Opera and Ballet Arizona. The Arizona Opera company also has intimate performances at its new Arizona Opera Center, which opened in March 2013. Another venue is the Orpheum Theatre, home to the Phoenix Opera. Ballet Arizona, in addition to the Symphony Hall, also has performances at the Orpheum Theatre and the Dorrance Theater. Concerts also regularly make stops in the area. The largest downtown performing art venue is the Herberger Theater Center, which houses three performance spaces and is home to two resident companies, the Arizona Theatre Company and the Centre Dance Ensemble. Three other groups also use the facility: Valley Youth Theatre, iTheatre Collaborative and Actors Theater.

Concerts take place at Mortgage Matchup Center and Comerica Theatre in downtown Phoenix, Ak-Chin Pavilion in Maryvale, Gila River Arena in Glendale, and Gammage Auditorium in Tempe (the last public building designed by Frank Lloyd Wright). Several smaller theaters including Trunk Space, the Mesa Arts Center, The Van Buren, the Crescent Ballroom, Celebrity Theatre, and Modified Arts support regular independent musical and theater performances. Music can also be seen in some of the venues usually reserved for sports, such as the Wells Fargo Arena and State Farm Stadium.

Several television series have been set in Phoenix, including Alice (1976–85), the 2000s paranormal drama Medium, the 1960–61 syndicated crime drama The Brothers Brannagan, and The New Dick Van Dyke Show from 1971 to 1974.

=== Museums ===
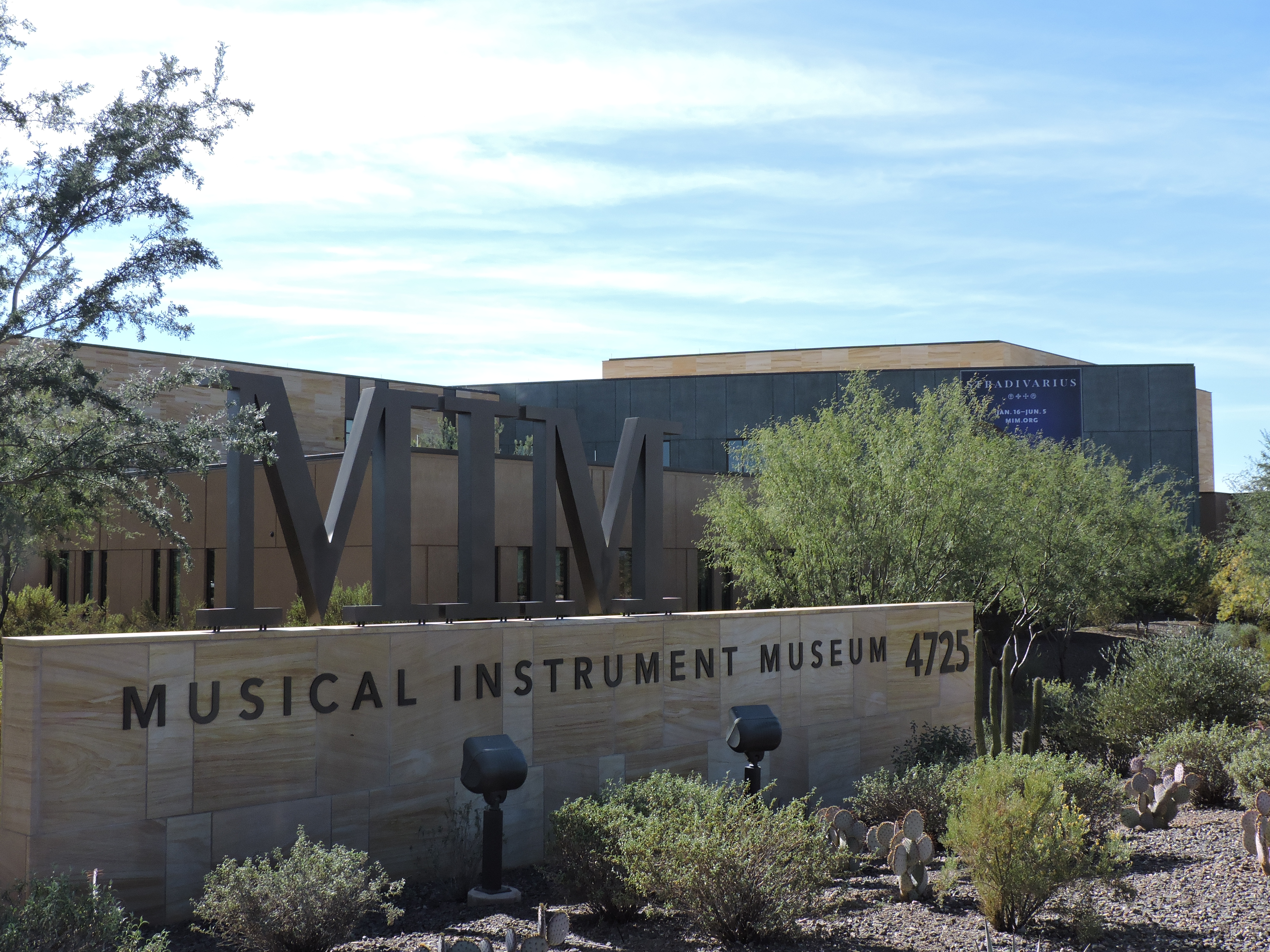
The Musical Instrument Museum features a collection of over 15,000 musical instruments

The valley has dozens of museums. They include the Phoenix Art Museum, Arizona Capitol Museum, Scottsdale Museum of Contemporary Art, Arizona Military Museum, Hall of Flame Fire Museum, Phoenix Police Museum, the Pueblo Grande Museum Archaeological Park, Children's Museum of Phoenix, Arizona Science Center, and the Heard Museum. In 2010, the Musical Instrument Museum opened their doors, featuring the biggest musical instrument collection in the world.

Designed by Alden B. Dow, a student of Frank Lloyd Wright, the Phoenix Art Museum was constructed in a single year, opening in November 1959. The Phoenix Art Museum has the southwest's largest collection of visual art, containing more than 17,000 works of contemporary and modern art from around the world. Interactive exhibits can be found in nearby Peoria's Challenger Space Center, where individuals learn about space, renewable energies, and meet astronauts.

The Heard Museum has over 130,000 square feet (12,000 m^{2}) of gallery, classroom and performance space. Some of the museum's signature exhibits include a full Navajo hogan, the Mareen Allen Nichols Collection of 260 pieces of contemporary jewelry, the Barry Goldwater Collection of 437 historic Hopi kachina dolls, and an exhibit on the 19th-century boarding school experiences of Native Americans. The Heard Museum attracts about 250,000 visitors a year.

=== Cultural heritage resources ===
Arizona has museums, journals, societies, and libraries that serve as sources of important cultural heritage knowledge. They include the Arizona State Archives Historic Photographs Memory Project, which includes over 90,000 images that focus on the unique history of Arizona as a state and territory, the Arizona Historical Society, the Journal of Arizona History, and numerous museum databases. The Tonatierra Community Development Institute focuses specifically on protecting indigenous culture in the city.

=== Fine arts ===
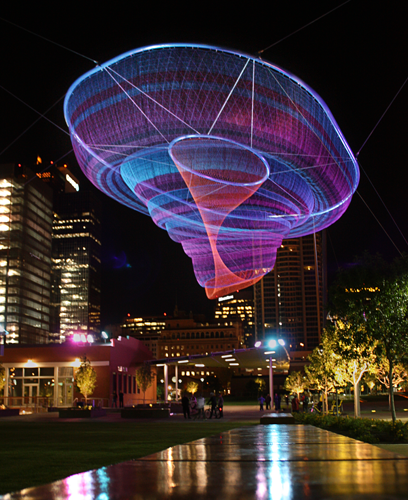
Her Secret is Patience by Janet Echelman

The Artlink organization and the galleries downtown launched a First Friday cross-Phoenix gallery opening. In April 2009, artist Janet Echelman installed Her Secret Is Patience, a netted sculpture suspended above Phoenix Civic Space Park that makes patterns of desert wind visible. During the day, the 100-foot-tall (30 m) sculpture hovers above the park, and at night, the illumination changes color gradually through the seasons.

=== Architecture ===
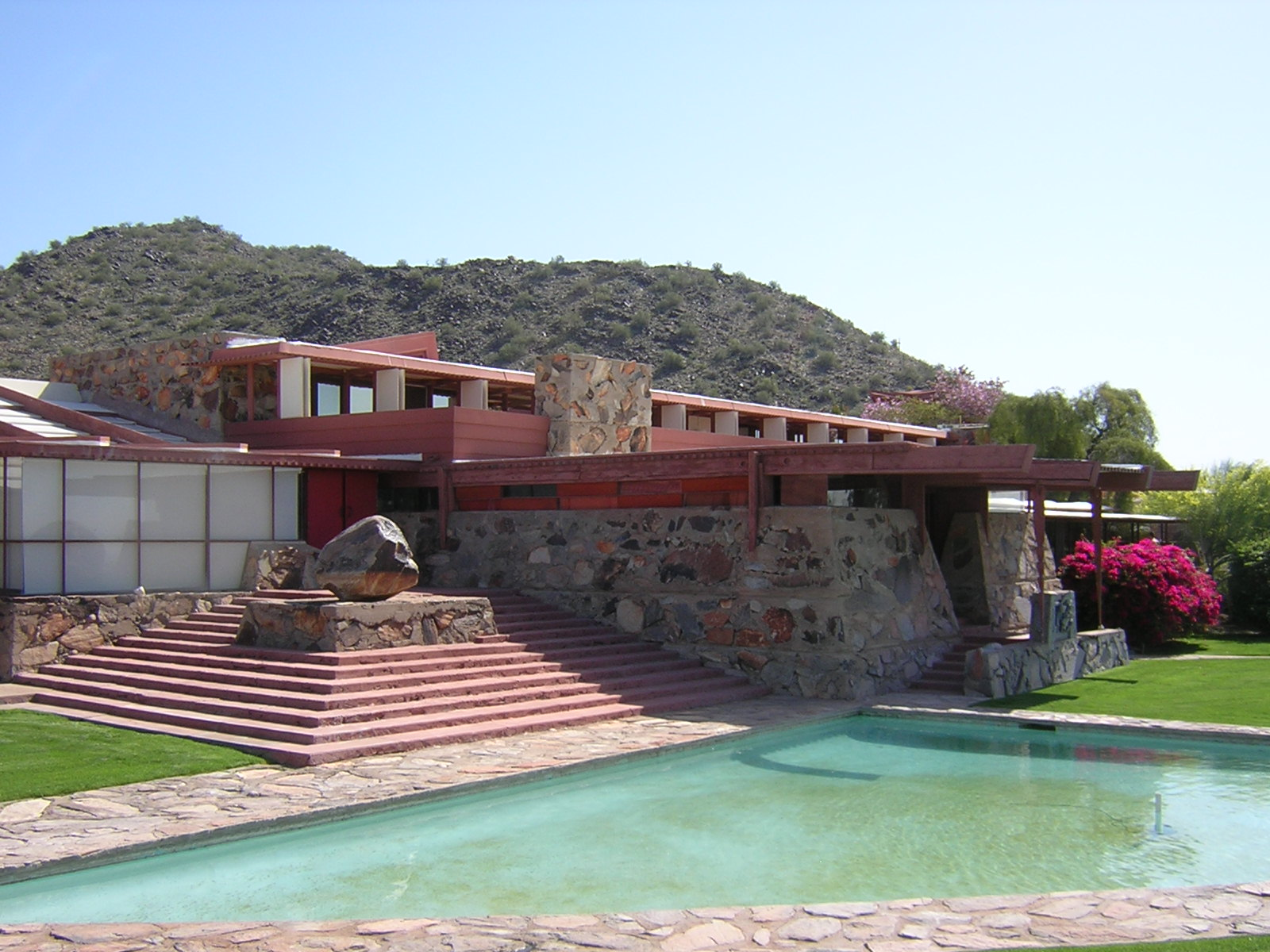
Taliesin West was a home and studio of Frank Lloyd Wright

Phoenix is the home of a unique architectural tradition and community. Frank Lloyd Wright moved to Phoenix in 1937 and built his winter home, Taliesin West, and the main campus for The Frank Lloyd Wright School of Architecture. Over the years, Phoenix has attracted notable architects who have made it their home and grown successful practices. These architectural studios embrace the desert climate, and are unconventional in their approach to the practice of design. They include the Paolo Soleri (who created Arcosanti), Al Beadle, Will Bruder, Wendell Burnette, and Blank Studio architectural design studios. Another major force in architectural landscape of the city was Ralph Haver whose firm, Haver & Nunn, designed commercial, industrial and residential structures throughout the valley. Of particular note was his trademark, "Haver Home", which were affordable contemporary-style tract houses.

=== Tourism ===
The tourist industry is the longest running of the top industries in Phoenix. Starting with promotions back in the 1920s, the industry has grown into one of the top 10 in the city. With nearly 28,000 hotel rooms in over 175 hotels and resorts Phoenix sees over 19 million visitors each year, most of whom are leisure travelers. Sky Harbor Airport, which serves the Greater Phoenix area, serves about 45 million passengers a year, ranking it among the nation's 10 busiest airports.

One of the biggest attractions of the Phoenix area is golf, with over 200 golf courses. In addition to the sites of interest in the city, there are many attractions near Phoenix, such as Agua Fria National Monument, Arcosanti, Casa Grande Ruins National Monument, Lost Dutchman State Park, Montezuma's Castle, Montezuma's Well, and Organ Pipe Cactus National Monument. Phoenix also serves as a central point to many of the sights around the state of Arizona, such as the Grand Canyon, Lake Havasu (where the London Bridge is located), Meteor Crater, the Painted Desert, the Petrified Forest, Tombstone, Kartchner Caverns, Sedona and Lowell Observatory in Flagstaff.

=== Other attractions and annual events ===
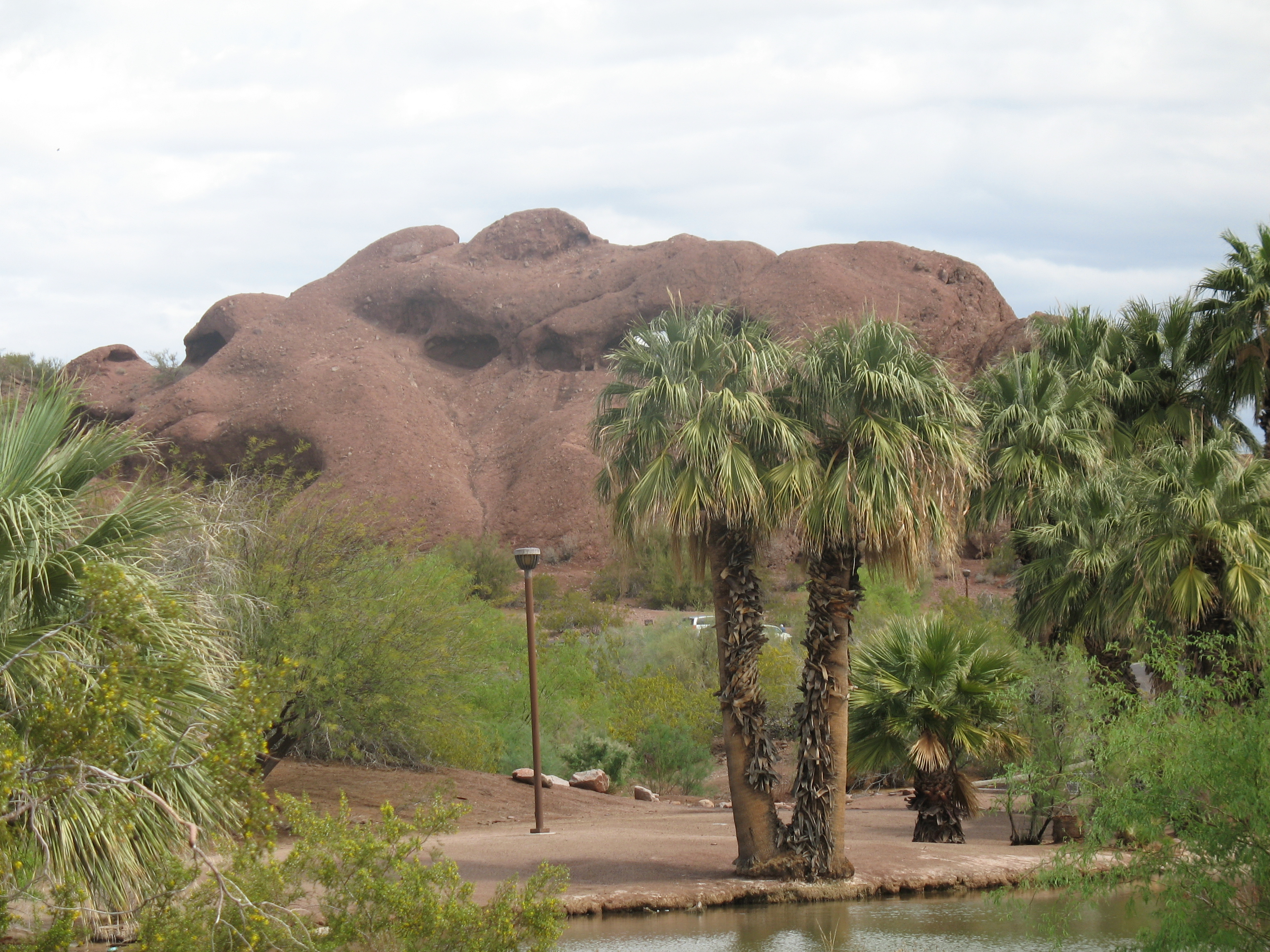
Papago Park is home to the Desert Botanical Garden, Hole-in-the-Rock butte and Phoenix Zoo

Due to its natural environment and climate, Phoenix has a number of outdoor attractions and recreational activities. The Phoenix Zoo is the largest privately owned nonprofit zoo in the United States. Since opening in 1962, it has developed an international reputation for its efforts on animal conservation, including breeding and reintroducing endangered species into the wild. The adjacent Phoenix Botanical Gardens, opened in 1939, are acclaimed worldwide for their art and flora exhibits and educational programs, featuring the largest collection of arid plants in the U.S. South Mountain Park, the largest municipal park in the U.S., is also the highest desert mountain preserve in the world.

Other popular sites in the city are Japanese Friendship Garden, Historic Heritage Square, Phoenix Mountains Park, Pueblo Grande Museum, Tovrea Castle, Camelback Mountain, Hole in the Rock, Mystery Castle, St. Mary's Basilica, Taliesin West, and the Wrigley Mansion.

Many annual events in and near Phoenix celebrate the city's heritage and its diversity. They include the Scottsdale Arabian Horse Show, the world's largest horse show; Matsuri, a celebration of Japanese culture; Pueblo Grande Indian Market, an event highlighting Native American arts and crafts; Grand Menorah Lighting, a December event celebrating Hanukah; ZooLights, a December evening event at the Phoenix Zoo that features millions of lights; the Arizona State Fair, begun in 1884; Scottish Gathering & Highland Games, an event celebrating Scottish heritage; Estrella War, a celebration of medieval life; and the Tohono O'odham Nation Rodeo & Fair, the oldest Indian rodeo in Arizona.

=== Cuisine ===
Phoenix is also renowned for its Mexican food, thanks to its large Hispanic population and its proximity to Mexico. Some of Phoenix's restaurants have a long history. The Stockyards steakhouse dates to 1947, while Monti's La Casa Vieja (Spanish for "The Old House") was in operation as a restaurant since the 1890s, but closed its doors November 17, 2014. Macayo's (a Mexican restaurant chain) was established in Phoenix in 1946, and other major Mexican restaurants include Garcia's (1956) and Manuel's (1964). The population boom has brought people from all over the nation, and to a lesser extent from other countries, and has since influenced the local cuisine. Phoenix boasts cuisines from all over the world, such as barbecue, Cajun/Creole, Greek, Hawaiian, Irish, Japanese, Italian, fusion, Persian, Indian (South Asian), Korean, Spanish, Thai, Chinese, southwestern, Tex-Mex, Vietnamese, Brazilian, and French.

The first McDonald's franchise was sold by the McDonald brothers to a Phoenix entrepreneur in 1952. Neil Fox paid $1,000 for the rights to open an establishment based on the McDonald brothers' restaurant. The hamburger stand opened in 1953 on the southwest corner of Central Avenue and Indian School Road, on the growing north side of Phoenix, and was the first location to sport the now internationally known golden arches, which were initially twice the height of the building. Three other franchise locations opened that year, two years before Ray Kroc purchased McDonald's.

== Sports ==
=== Major league ===
Phoenix is home to several professional sports franchises, and until recently, was one of only 13 U.S. metropolitan areas to have representatives of all four major professional sports leagues, although only one of these teams actually carry the city name and two of them play within the city limits.

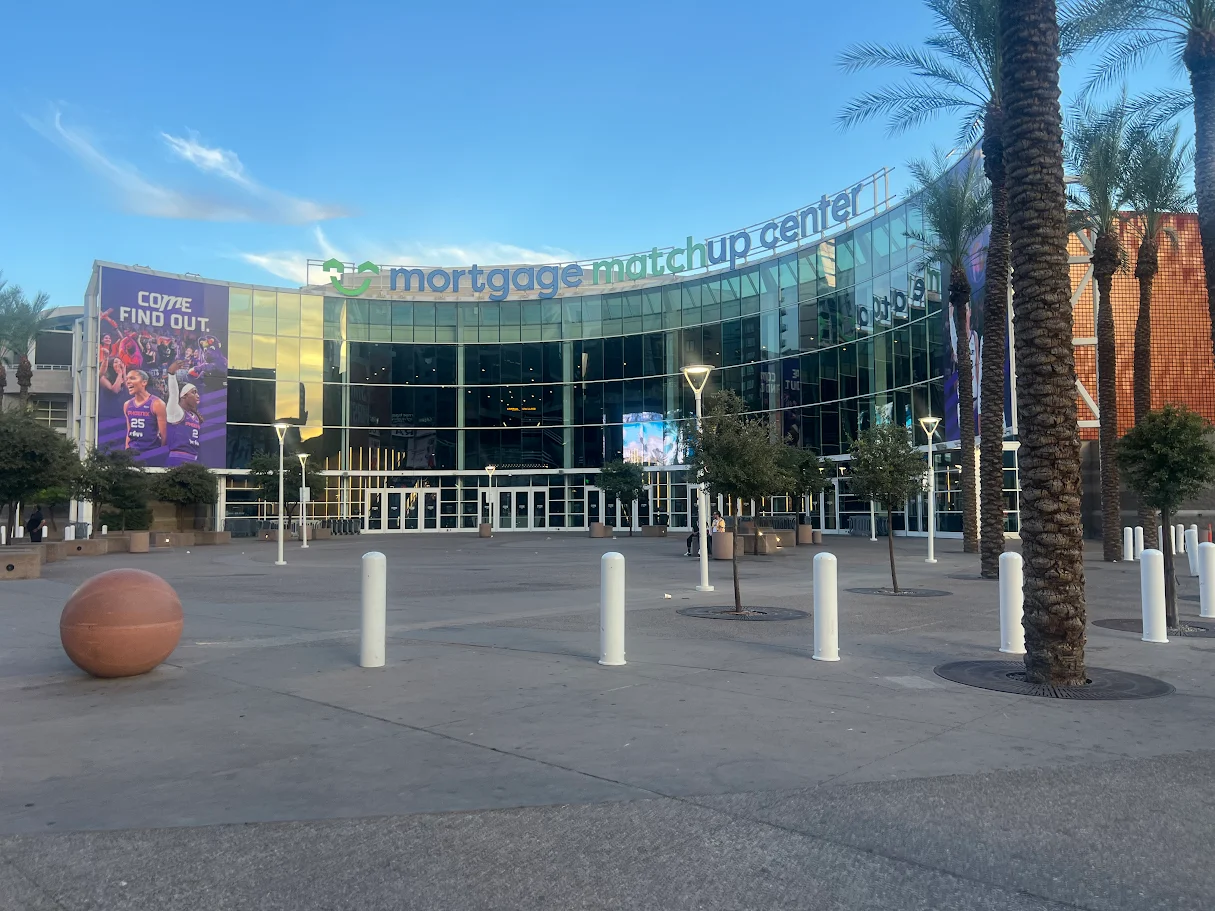
Mortgage Matchup Center in downtown Phoenix, home to the Phoenix Mercury and the Phoenix Suns.

The Phoenix Mercury are the most successful professional sports franchise in Phoenix. They have won a total of three WNBA national titles since their creation in 1997, with championships in 2007, 2009, and 2014 defeating the Detroit Shock, Indiana Fever, and Chicago Sky respectively. The team is one of eight original founding members of the WNBA and they play their home games at Mortgage Matchup Center. They have had seven Women's Basketball Hall of Famers on their team, as well as one FIBA Hall of Famer in Michele Timms who played for the Mercury from 1997-2001. Their ranks have included famous players like Diana Taurasi and Brittney Griner. Their last WNBA finals appearance was in 2021 where they lost 3-1 to the Chicago Sky.

The Phoenix Suns were the first major sports team in Phoenix, being granted a National Basketball Association (NBA) franchise in 1968. They lost the 1976 NBA Championship to the Boston Celtics in 6 games. They had originally played at the Arizona Veterans Memorial Coliseum before moving to America West Arena (now Mortgage Matchup Center) in 1992. The year following their move to the new arena, the Suns made it to the NBA Finals for the second time in franchise history, losing to Michael Jordan's Chicago Bulls, four games to two. The U.S. Airways Center hosted both the 1995 and the 2009 NBA All-Star Games. They also lost the 2021 NBA Finals in six games to the Milwaukee Bucks.

The Arizona Diamondbacks of Major League Baseball began play as an expansion team in 1998. The team has played all of its home games in the same downtown park, now known as Chase Field. It is the second highest stadium in the U.S. (after Coors Field in Denver), and is known for its swimming pool beyond the outfield fence. In 2001, the Diamondbacks defeated the New York Yankees four games to three in the World Series, becoming the city's first professional sports franchise to win a national championship while in Arizona. The win was also the fastest an expansion team had ever won the World Series, surpassing the old mark of the Florida Marlins of five years, set in 1997.

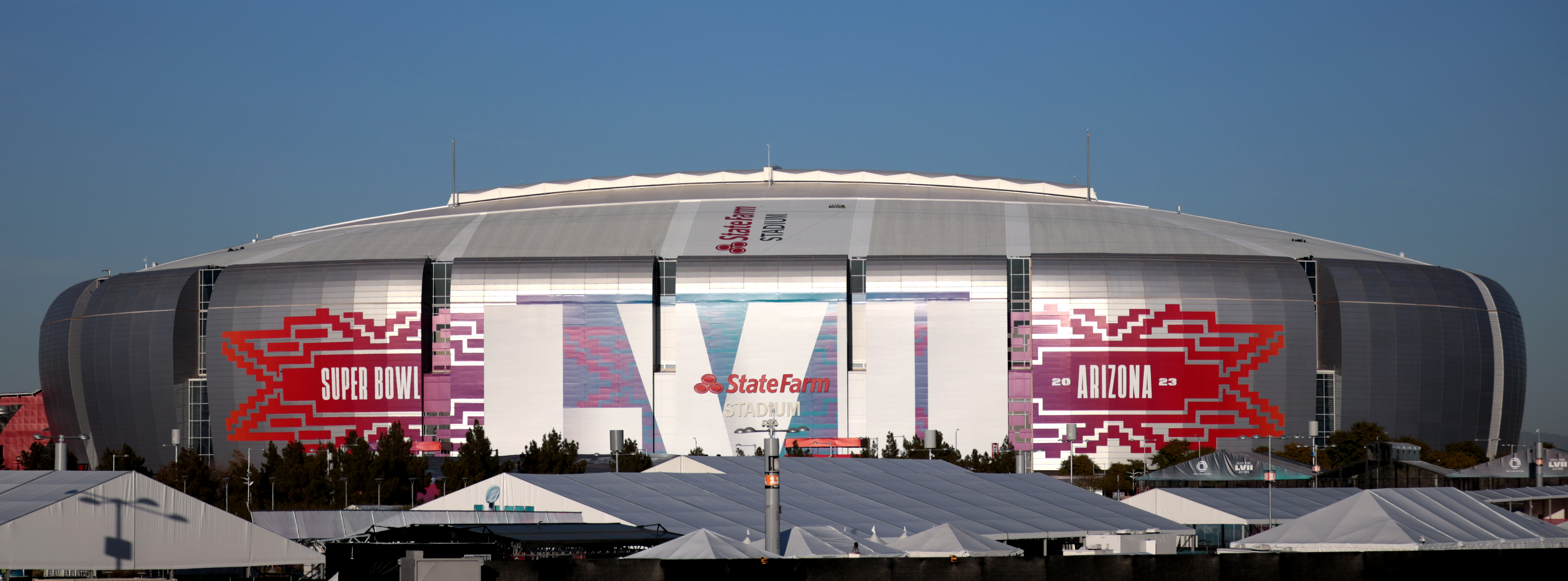
State Farm Stadium has hosted Super Bowl XLII, XLIX, and LVII

The Arizona Cardinals are the oldest continuously run professional football franchise in the nation. Founded in 1898 in Chicago, they moved to Phoenix from St. Louis, Missouri in 1988 and play in the Western Division of the National Football League's National Football Conference. Upon their move to Phoenix, the Cardinals played their home games at Sun Devil Stadium on the campus of Arizona State University in nearby Tempe. In 2006, they moved to the new State Farm Stadium in suburban Glendale. Since moving to Phoenix, the Cardinals have made one championship appearance, Super Bowl XLIII in 2009, where they lost 27–23 to the Pittsburgh Steelers.

Sun Devil Stadium held Super Bowl XXX in 1996. State Farm Stadium hosted Super Bowl XLII in 2008, Super Bowl XLIX in 2015, and Super Bowl LVII in 2023 .

The Arizona Coyotes of the National Hockey League, formerly the original Winnipeg Jets, moved to the area in 1996. They originally played their home games at America West Arena in downtown Phoenix before moving in December 2003 to the Glendale Arena (now named the Desert Diamond Arena) in Glendale. In 2022, the Coyotes lost their lease in Glendale and moved to the then newly opened Mullett Arena on the campus of Arizona State University. They were working with the city of Tempe to create a new entertainment district. However, after residents of Tempe rejected a bond initiative to pay for a new stadium, the Coyotes were deactivated, and the team's assets were moved to Salt Lake City, Utah. The Coyotes had a five-year window to get a new arena in the area where they would have been reactivated as an expansion franchise; however, then majority owner Alex Meruelo declined, and the league ceased all operations for the franchise.

Phoenix Rising FC is a professional soccer team that competes in the USL Championship, the second tier of US professional soccer. Phoenix Rising FC started as Arizona United SC in 2014 and played at the Peoria Sports Complex and Scottsdale Stadium from 2014 to 2016. Rebranded in 2017 as Phoenix Rising FC, the team started play from 2017 to 2020 at the Casino Arizona Field. In 2021, the club moved to a new home, the Phoenix Rising Soccer Complex at Wild Horse Pass, which was located inside the Gila River Indian Community near Chandler and played there throughout the 2022 season. The club began play in 2023 at the newly constructed Phoenix Rising Soccer Stadium, which is modular in design and located in an area north of Phoenix Sky Harbor International Airport.

In 2018, the now-defunct Alliance of American Football announced the league's Phoenix franchise, the Arizona Hotshots, would begin playing in 2019.

Professional teams in the Phoenix area
Club	Sport	Year started operations	League	Venue	Titles
Arizona Cardinals	Football	1988*	NFL	State Farm Stadium	2*
Arizona Diamondbacks	Baseball	1998	MLB	Chase Field	1
Phoenix Suns	Basketball	1968	NBA	Mortgage Matchup Center	0
Phoenix Mercury	Basketball	1997	WNBA	Mortgage Matchup Center	3
Arizona Rattlers	Indoor football	1992	IFL	Desert Diamond Arena	8
Arizona Ridge Riders	Bull riding	2022	PBR	Desert Diamond Arena	0
Phoenix Rising FC	Soccer	2014	USLC	Phoenix Rising Soccer Stadium	1

*Note: The Cardinals won their two pre-modern era championships while in Chicago. *Note: The Cardinals moved to Phoenix from St. Louis in 1988.

=== Other sports ===
The Phoenix area hosts two annual college football bowl games: the Fiesta Bowl, played at State Farm Stadium, and the Rate Bowl (which has undergone several name changes), held at Chase Field.

Phoenix has an indoor football team, the Arizona Rattlers of the Indoor Football League. Their games are played at the Desert Diamond Arena. They played in the Arena Football League from 1992 to 2016 and had won five AFL championships before leaving the league.

The Greater Phoenix area is home to the Cactus League, one of two spring training leagues for Major League Baseball. With the move by the Colorado Rockies and the Diamondbacks to their new facility in the Salt River Indian Community, the league is entirely based in the Greater Phoenix area. With the Cincinnati Reds' move to Goodyear, half of MLB's 30 teams are now included in the Cactus League.

Phoenix International Raceway was built in 1964 with a one-mile (1.6 km) oval, with a one-of-a-kind design, as well as a 2.5-mile (4.0 km) road course. It hosts several NASCAR events per season, and the annual Fall NASCAR weekend, which includes events from four different NASCAR classes, is a huge event. Wild Horse Pass Motorsports Park (formerly Firebird International Raceway) hosts NHRA events in the Phoenix metropolitan area.

The city also hosts several major professional golf events, including the LPGA's Founder's Cup and, since 1932, The Phoenix Open of the PGA Tour. The Phoenix Marathon is a new addition to the city's sports scene, and is a qualifier for the Boston Marathon. The Rock 'n' Roll Marathon series has held an event in Phoenix every January since 2004. Phoenix is also home to a soccer club, Phoenix Rising FC.

== Parks and recreation ==
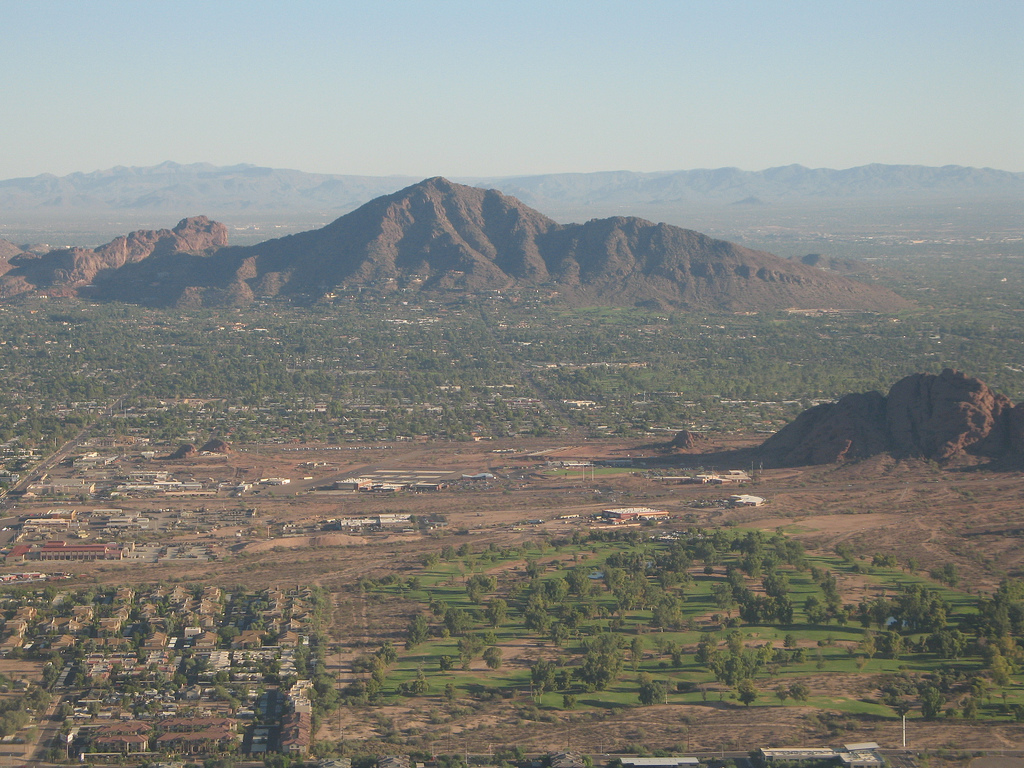
Camelback Mountain is part of the Phoenix Mountains range

Phoenix is home to a large number of parks and recreation areas. The city of Phoenix includes national parks, Maricopa County parks and city parks. Tonto National Forest forms part of the city's northeast boundary, while the county has the largest park system in the country.

The city park system established to preserve the desert landscape in areas that would otherwise have succumbed to development includes South Mountain Park, the world's largest municipal park with 16,500 acres (67 km^{2}). The system's 182 parks contain over 41,900 acres (16,956 ha), making it the largest municipal park system in the country. The park system has facilities for hiking, camping, swimming, horseback riding, cycling, and climbing. Some of the system's other notable parks include Camelback Mountain, Encanto Park, Phoenix Mountains Preserve and Sunnyslope Mountain, also known as "S" Mountain.

Papago Park in east Phoenix is home to both the Desert Botanical Garden and the Phoenix Zoo, in addition to several golf courses and the Hole-in-the-Rock geological formation. The Desert Botanical Garden, which opened in 1939, is one of the few public gardens in the country dedicated to desert plants and displays desert plant life from all over the world. The Phoenix Zoo is the largest privately owned non-profit zoo in the United States and is internationally known for its programs devoted to saving endangered species.

== Government ==
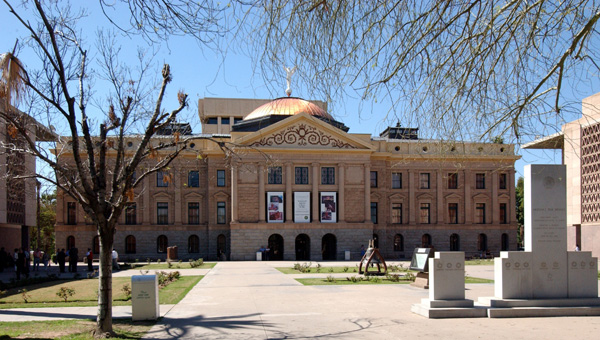
The Arizona State Capitol, which used to house the state legislature, is now a museum.

In 1913, Phoenix adopted a new form of government, switching from the mayor-council system to the council-manager system, making it one of the first cities in the United States with this form of city government, where a city manager supervises all city departments and executes the policies adopted by the council. Today, Phoenix represents the largest municipal government of this type in the country.

The city council consists of a mayor and eight city council members. While the mayor is elected in a citywide election, Phoenix City Council members are elected by votes only in the districts they represent, with both the Mayor and the Council members serving four-year terms. The mayor of Phoenix is Kate Gallego. The mayor and city council members each have equal voting power in regards to setting city policy and passing rules and regulations. Sunshine Review gave the city's website a Sunny Award for its transparency efforts.

=== State government facilities ===
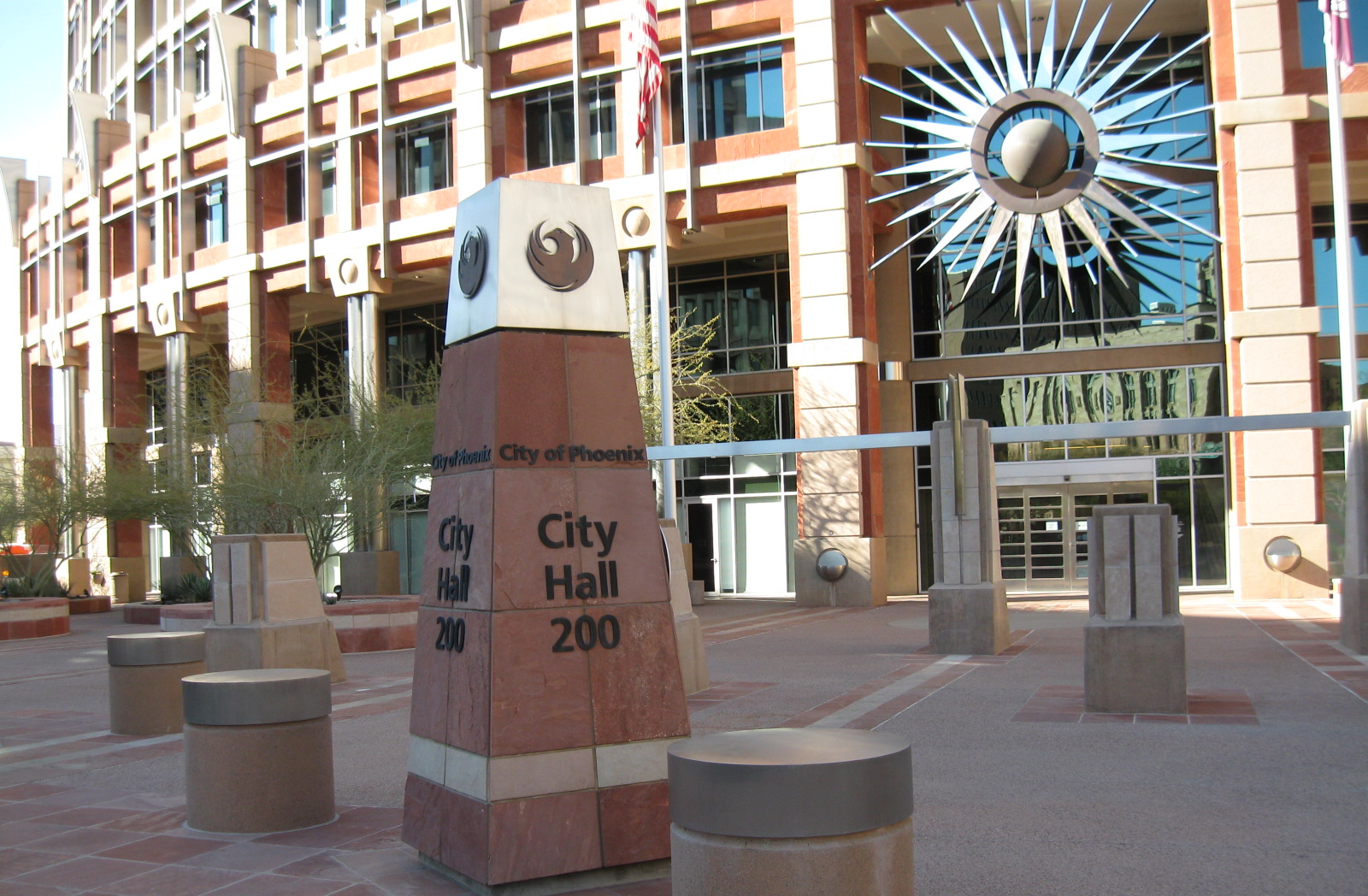
Phoenix City Hall, showing the city's logo, the phoenix bird

As the capital of Arizona, Phoenix houses the state legislature, along with numerous state government agencies, many of which are in the State Capitol district immediately west of downtown. The Arizona Department of Juvenile Corrections operates the Adobe Mountain and Black Canyon Schools in Phoenix. Another major state government facility is the Arizona State Hospital, operated by the Arizona Department of Health Services. This is a mental health center and is the only medical facility run by the state government. The headquarters of numerous Arizona state government agencies are in Phoenix, with many in the State Capitol district.

=== Federal government facilities ===
The Federal Bureau of Prisons operates the Federal Correctional Institution (FCI) Phoenix, which is within the city limits, near its northern boundary.

The Sandra Day O'Connor U.S. Courthouse, the U.S. District Court of Arizona, is on Washington Street downtown. It is named in honor of retired U.S. Supreme Court Justice Sandra Day O'Connor, who was raised in Arizona.

The Federal Building is at the intersection of Van Buren Street and First Avenue downtown. It contains various federal field offices and the local division of the U.S. Bankruptcy Court. This building formerly housed the U.S. District Court offices and courtrooms, but these were moved in 2001 to the new Sandra Day O'Connor U.S. Courthouse. Before the construction of this building in 1961, federal government offices were housed in the historic U.S. Post Office on Central Avenue, completed in the 1930s.

=== Crime ===
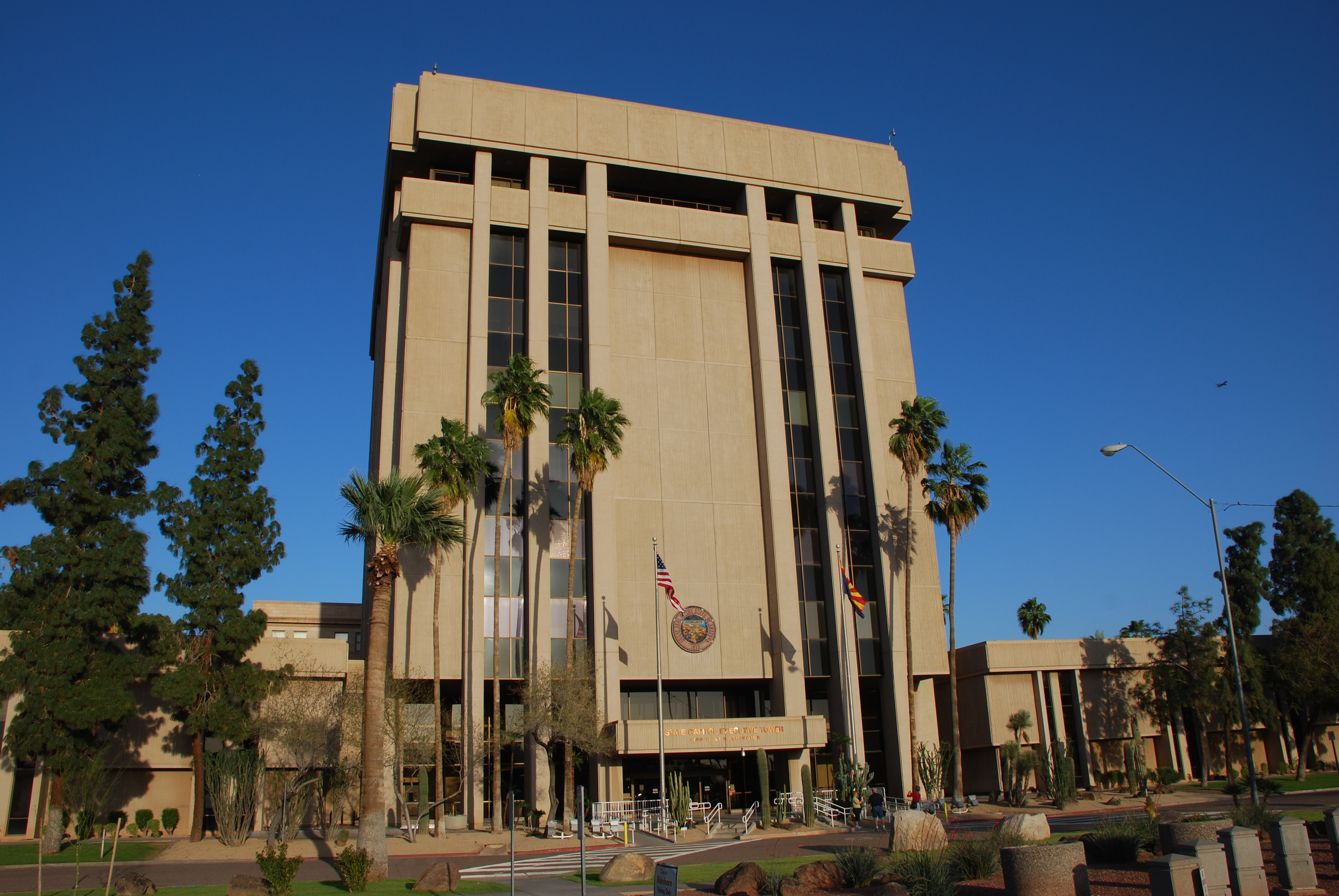
Arizona State Capitol Executive Tower at 1700 W. Washington St.

By the 1960s, crime was a major problem in Phoenix, and by the 1970s, crime continued to increase in the city at a faster rate than almost anywhere else in the country. It was during this time frame when an incident occurred in Phoenix which would have national implications. On March 16, 1963, Ernesto Miranda was arrested and charged with rape. The subsequent Supreme Court ruling on June 13, 1966, Miranda v. Arizona, has led to practice in the United States of issuing a Miranda Warning to all suspected criminals.

With Phoenix's rapid growth, one of the prime areas of criminal activity was land fraud. The practice became so widespread that newspapers would refer to Phoenix as the Tainted Desert. These land frauds led to one of the more infamous murders in the history of the valley, when Arizona Republic writer Don Bolles was murdered by a car bomb in 1976. It was believed his investigative reporting on organized crime and land fraud in Phoenix made him a target. Bolles was the only reporter from a major U.S. newspaper to be murdered on U.S. soil due to his coverage of a story. Max Dunlap was convicted of first-degree murder in the case.

Street gangs and the drug trade had turned into public safety issues by the 1980s, and the crime rate in Phoenix continued to grow. After seeing a peak in the early and mid-1990s, the city has seen a general decrease in crime rates. The Maricopa County Jail system is the fourth-largest in the country. The violent crime rate peaked in 1993 at 1146 crimes per 100,000 people, while the property crime rate peaked a few years earlier, in 1989, at 9,966 crimes per 100,000.

In 2001 and 2002, Phoenix ranked first in the nation in vehicle thefts, with over 22,000 and 25,000 cars stolen each year respectively. It has declined every year since then, eventually falling to 7,200 in 2014, a drop of almost 70% during that timeframe. The Phoenix MSA has dropped to 70th in the nation in terms of car thefts in 2012.

On August 2, 2022, a mass shooting took place in the Deer Valley area of Phoenix. The shooter killed two bystanders and injured five others before committing suicide.

=== Politics ===
Long a swing region in Arizona, Phoenix's city limits have increasingly trended toward the Democratic Party in recent years, leading a shift seen across the rest of the state, although the trend was bucked in 2024 with Hispanics shifting right. Margaret Hance was elected the city's first female mayor in 1975.

Phoenix city limits presidential election results
Year	Democratic	Republican	Third parties
2024	56.4% 350,095	42.3% 262,560	1.2% 7,594
2020	59.6% 388,435	38.9% 253,250	1.6% 10,238
2016	53.9% 271,946	38.7% 195,513	7.4% 37,389

== Education ==
33 school districts provide public education in the Phoenix area. This is a legacy of numerous annexations over the years; many of the school districts existed before their territories became part of Phoenix.

There are 21 elementary school districts, which have over 215 elementary schools, paired with four high school districts with 31 high schools serving Phoenix. Three of the high school districts (Glendale Union, Tempe Union, and Tolleson Union) only partially serve Phoenix. With over 27,000 students, and spread over 220 square miles (570 km^{2}), Phoenix Union High School District is one of the largest high school districts in the country, containing 16 schools and nearly 3,000 employees. In addition, there are four unified districts, which cover grades K–12, which add an additional 58 elementary schools and four high schools to Phoenix's educational system. Of those four, only the Paradise Valley district completely serves Phoenix. Phoenix is also served by a growing number of charter schools, with well over 100 operating in the city.

=== Post-secondary education ===
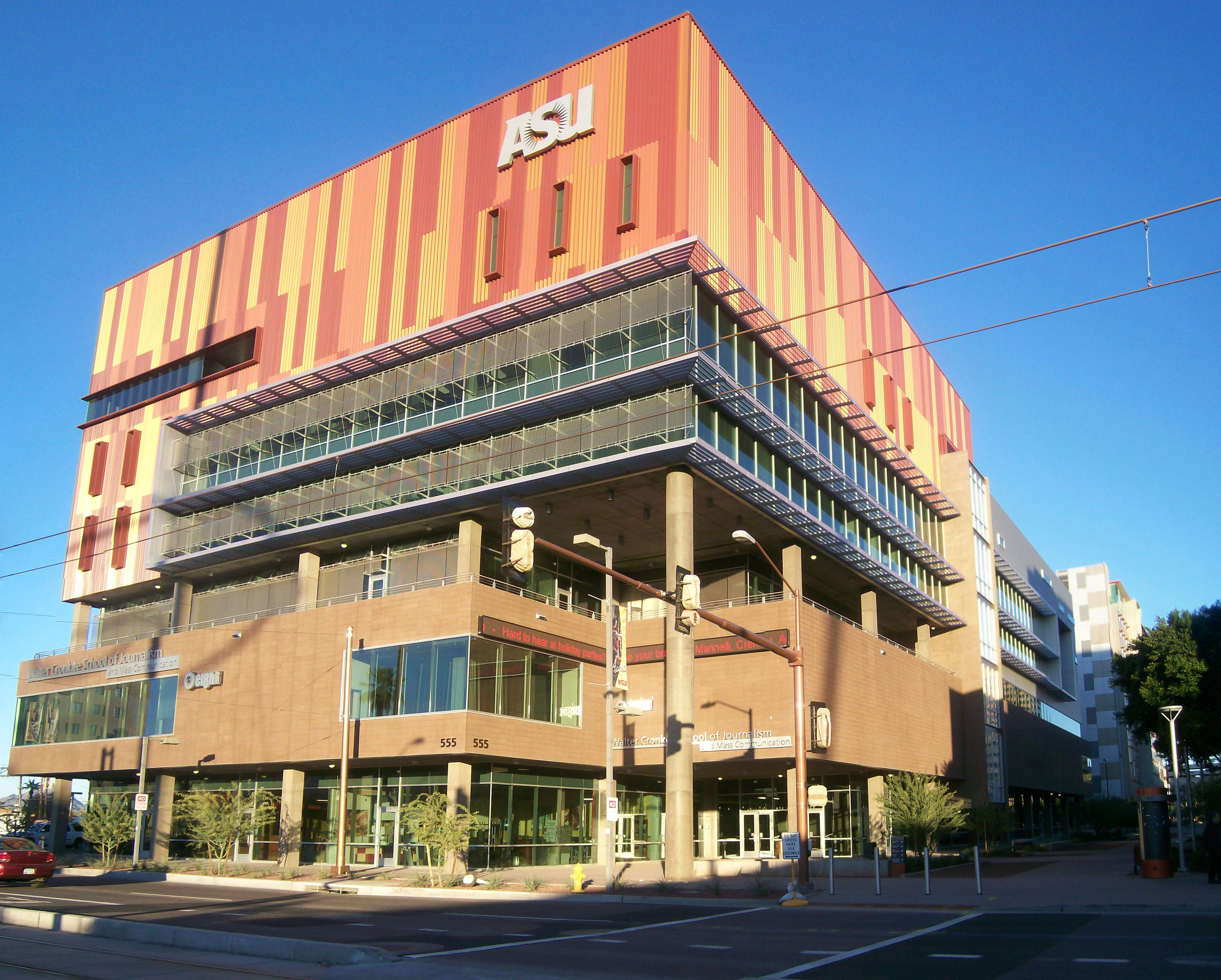
The Walter Cronkite School of Journalism and Mass Communication at the Arizona State University Downtown Phoenix campus

Arizona State University (ASU) is the region's largest institution of higher education. Primarily based in Tempe, it has a significant presence at the Arizona State University Downtown Phoenix campus. The campus features programs from ten of ASU's colleges, including the primary locations for the Walter Cronkite School of Journalism and Mass Communication, Watts College of Public Service & Community Solutions, and Sandra Day O'Connor College of Law. Over 10,000 students are enrolled at ASU's Downtown Phoenix campus.

The University of Arizona College of Medicine – Phoenix is also located in downtown Phoenix, as well as a satellite Phoenix Biomedical Campus of Northern Arizona University.

The Creighton University Arizona Health Education Alliance partnership is a medical school that teaches medical learners within a collaborative framework through multiple disciplines of health science, clinical learning environment, research and teaching medical students, residents, fellows, nurses, allied health and related health professionals. The Alliance consists of five partners: Crieghton University, Valleywise Health, District Medical Group, Dignity Health St. Joseph's Hospital and Medical Center and Dignity Medical Group.

The Maricopa County Community College District includes ten community colleges and two skills centers throughout Maricopa County, providing adult education and job training. Phoenix College, part of the district, was founded in 1920 and is the oldest community college in Arizona and one of the oldest in the country.

Carrington College, a for-profit institution, maintains a campus in Phoenix. The school offers programs in medicine, health studies, dentistry, administration, or veterinary medicine. More than 1087 students attend programs in health care administration, pharmacy technology, practical nursing, veterinary assisting, and dental assisting.

The city is also home to many other institutions of higher learning such as the Phoenix Seminary, a Protestant seminary that imparts degree in biblical studies, Christian theology, church history and counseling. Notable institutions include: Barrow Neurological Institute, the world's largest neurological disease treatment and research institution; Grand Canyon University, a private Christian university initially founded in 1949 as a non-profit school, it now operates as a for-profit institution; the University of Phoenix, also a for-profit college, is based out of the city.

== Media ==
Phoenix's first newspaper was the weekly Salt River Valley Herald, established in 1878, which would change its name the following year to the Phoenix Herald. The paper would go through several additional name changes in its early years before finally settling on the Phoenix Herald, which still exists today in an online form. Today, the city is served by one major daily newspaper: The Arizona Republic, which along with its online entity, azcentral.com, serves the greater metropolitan area. The Jewish News of Greater Phoenix is an independent weekly newspaper established in 1948. In addition, the city is also served by numerous free neighborhood papers and alternative weeklies such as the Phoenix New Times' the East Valley Tribune, which primarily serves the cities of the East Valley; and Arizona State University's The State Press.

The Phoenix metro area is served by many local television stations and is the largest designated market area (DMA) in the Southwest, and the 12th largest in the U.S., with over 1.8 million homes (1.6% of the total U.S.). The major network television affiliates are KPHO 5 (CBS), Prescott-licensed KAZT-TV 7 (The CW), KAET 8 (PBS, operated by Arizona State University), KSAZ 10 (Fox), KPNX 12 (NBC), KNXV 15 (ABC), and KUTP 45 (MyNetworkTV). Other network television affiliates operating in the area include KPAZ 21 (TBN), KTVW-DT 33 (Univision), KFPH-DT (UniMás), KTAZ 39 (Telemundo), and KPPX-TV 51 (ION). KTVK 3 (3TV) and KASW 61 are independent television stations operating in the metro area. KSAZ-TV, KUTP, KPAZ-TV, KTVW-DT, KFPH-DT, and KTAZ are network owned-and-operated stations.

Many major feature films and television programs have been filmed in the city. From the opening sequences in Psycho, to the night attack by the aliens in 1953's The War of the Worlds, to freeway scenes in Little Miss Sunshine, Phoenix has been the location for numerous major feature films. Other notable pictures filmed at least partially in Phoenix include Raising Arizona, A Home at the End of the World, Bill & Ted's Excellent Adventure, Days of Thunder, The Gauntlet, The Grifters, Waiting to Exhale and Bus Stop.

The radio airwaves in Phoenix cater to a wide variety of musical and talk radio interests. Stations include classic rock formats of KOOL-FM and KSLX-FM, to pop stations like KYOT and alternative stations like KDKB-FM, to the talk radio of KFYI-AM and KKNT-AM, the pop and top 40 programming of KZZP-FM and KALV-FM, and the country sounds of KMLE-FM. With its large Hispanic population there are numerous Spanish stations, such as KHOT-FM and KOMR-FM.

== Infrastructure ==
=== Transportation ===
==== Air ====
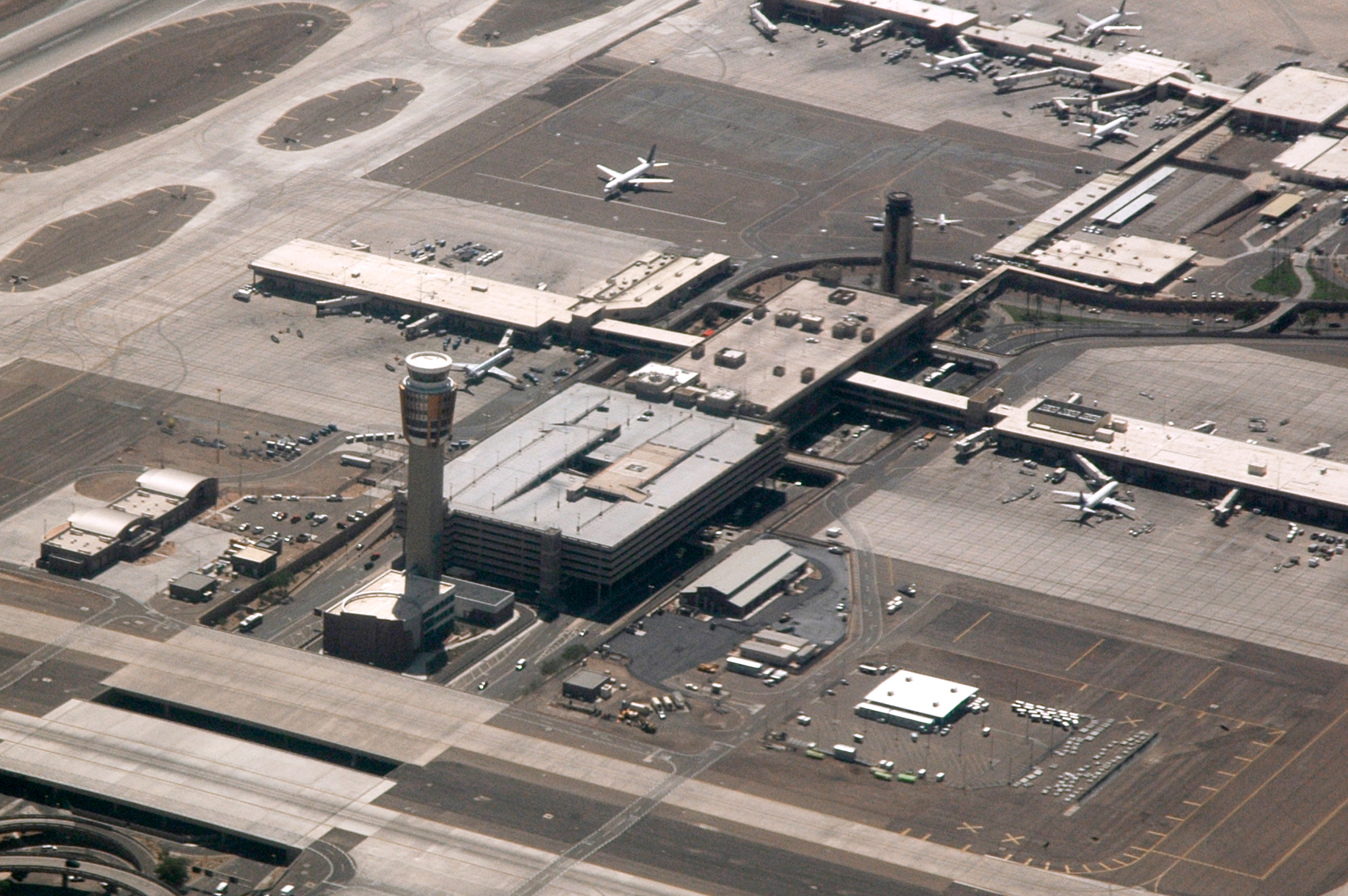
An aerial view of the control tower at Phoenix Sky Harbor that began operations on January 17, 2007

Phoenix Sky Harbor International Airport (IATA: PHX, ICAO: KPHX), one of the ten busiest airports in the United States, serves over 110,000 people on over 1,000 flights per day. Centrally located in the metro area near several major freeway interchanges east of downtown Phoenix, the airport serves more than 100 cities with non-stop flights.

The Phoenix-Mesa Gateway Airport (IATA: AZA, ICAO: KIWA) in neighboring Mesa also serves the area's commercial air traffic. It was converted from Williams Air Force Base, which closed in 1993. The airport has recently received substantial commercial service with Allegiant Air opening a hub operation at the airport with non-stop service to over a dozen destinations.

Smaller airports that primarily handle private and corporate jets include Phoenix Deer Valley Airport, in the Deer Valley district of north Phoenix, and Scottsdale Airport, just east of the Phoenix/Scottsdale border. There are also other municipal airports including Chandler Municipal Airport, Glendale Municipal Airport, Falcon Field Airport in Mesa, and Phoenix Goodyear Airport.

==== Rail and bus ====
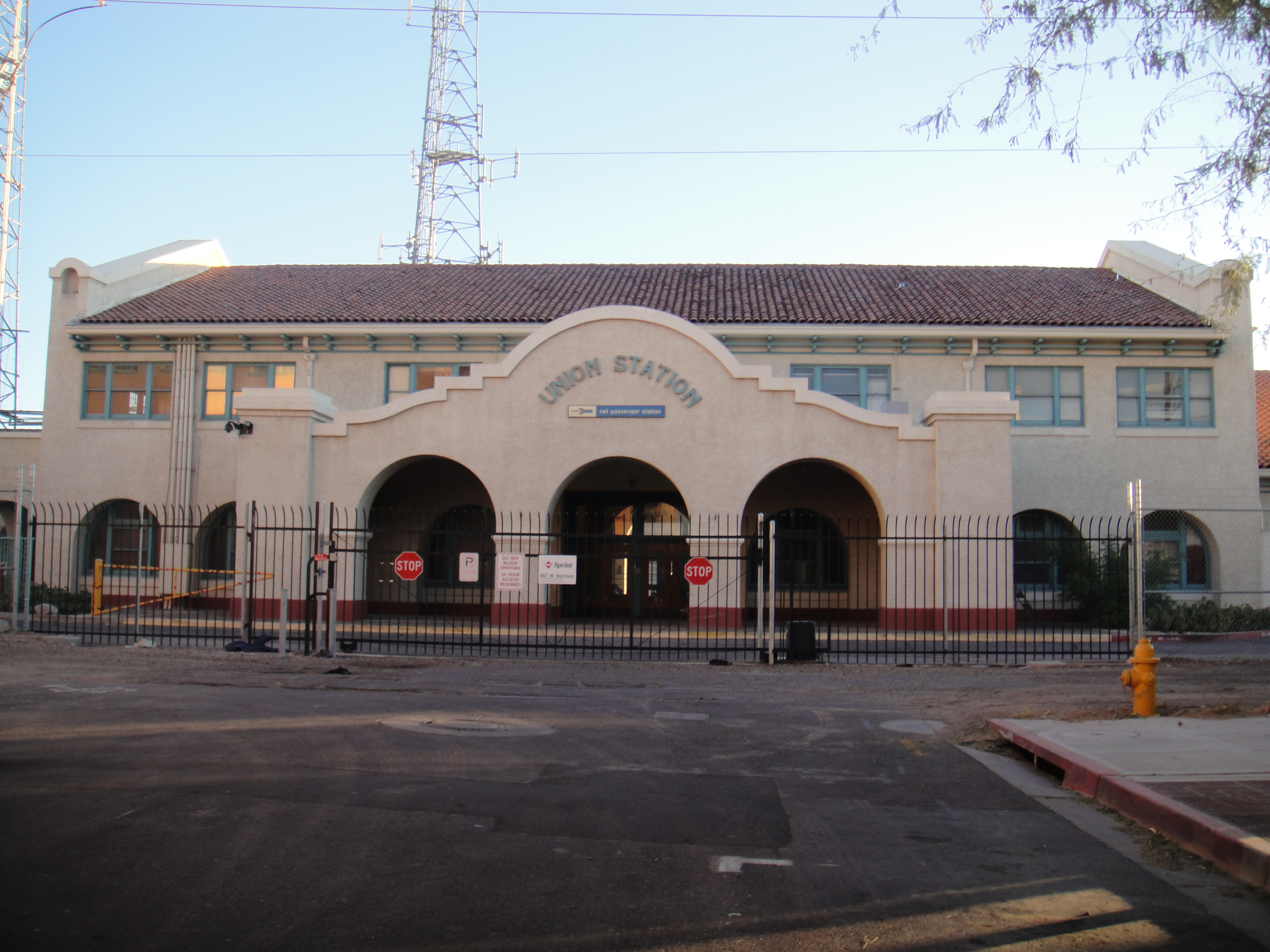
Union Station Phoenix – 2009

Amtrak served Phoenix Union Station until 1996 when the Union Pacific Railroad (UP) proposed abandoning the route between Yuma, Arizona, and Phoenix. Amtrak rerouted trains to Maricopa, 30 miles (48 km) south of downtown Phoenix, where passengers can board the Texas Eagle (Los Angeles-San Antonio-Chicago) and Sunset Limited (Los Angeles-New Orleans). UP retained the trackage and the station remains. In 2021, Amtrak developed a plan to bring rail service back to Phoenix with connections to Tucson and Los Angeles. This service is supported by the Bipartisan infrastructure bill and could take several years for service to be implemented.

Amtrak Thruway buses connect Phoenix Sky Harbor International Airport to Flagstaff for connection with the Los Angeles-Chicago Southwest Chief. Phoenix is also served by Greyhound bus service, which stops at 24th Street near the airport.

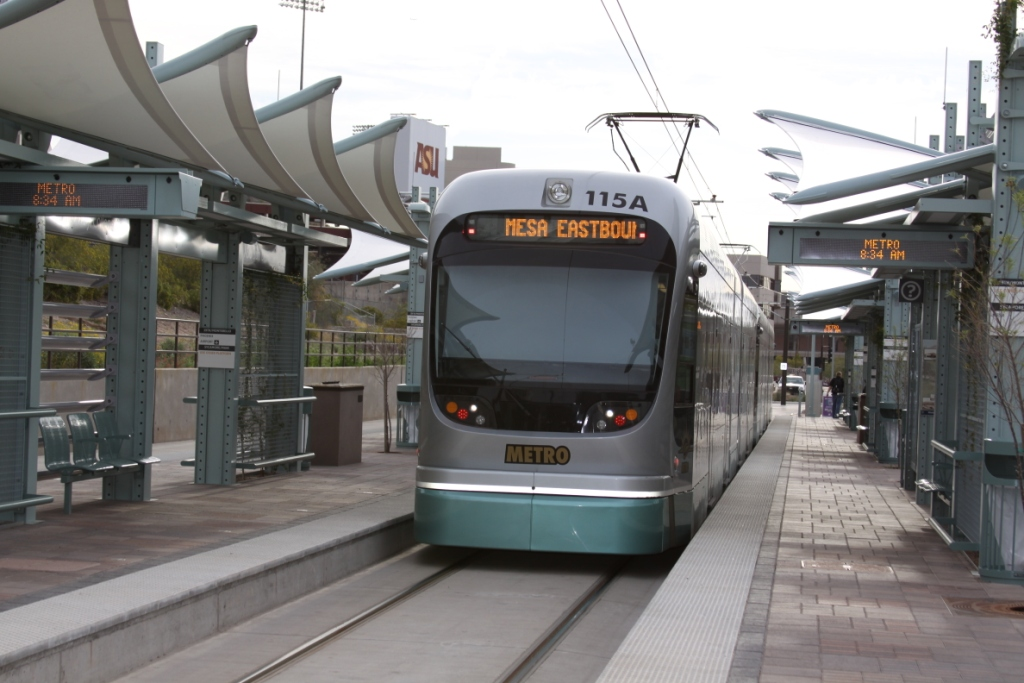
Valley Metro Rail station – 2009

Valley Metro provides public transportation throughout the metropolitan area, with its trains, buses, and a ride-share program. 3.38% of workers commute by public transit. Valley Metro's 38.5-mile (62.0 km) light rail system called Valley Metro Rail consists of the A Line and B Line. Two light rail extensions of more than 10.8 miles (17.4 km) are planned to open by 2030. The first segment of the light rail open in December 27, 2008. The 5.5 mile $1.3 billion South Central Extension that runs along Central and First avenues south to Baseline Road on the B Line opened on June 7, 2025.

==== Roads and freeways ====
Phoenix auto traffic depends on both freeways and surface streets. Freeways fall under the auspices of the Arizona Department of Transportation (ADOT). Phoenix ranks first in the nation in the quality of its urban freeways, and the state as a whole ranks first in the nation in the quality of bridges. Though it is the fifth most populous city in the nation, Phoenix's freeways do not suffer from the same type of congestion seen in other large cities.

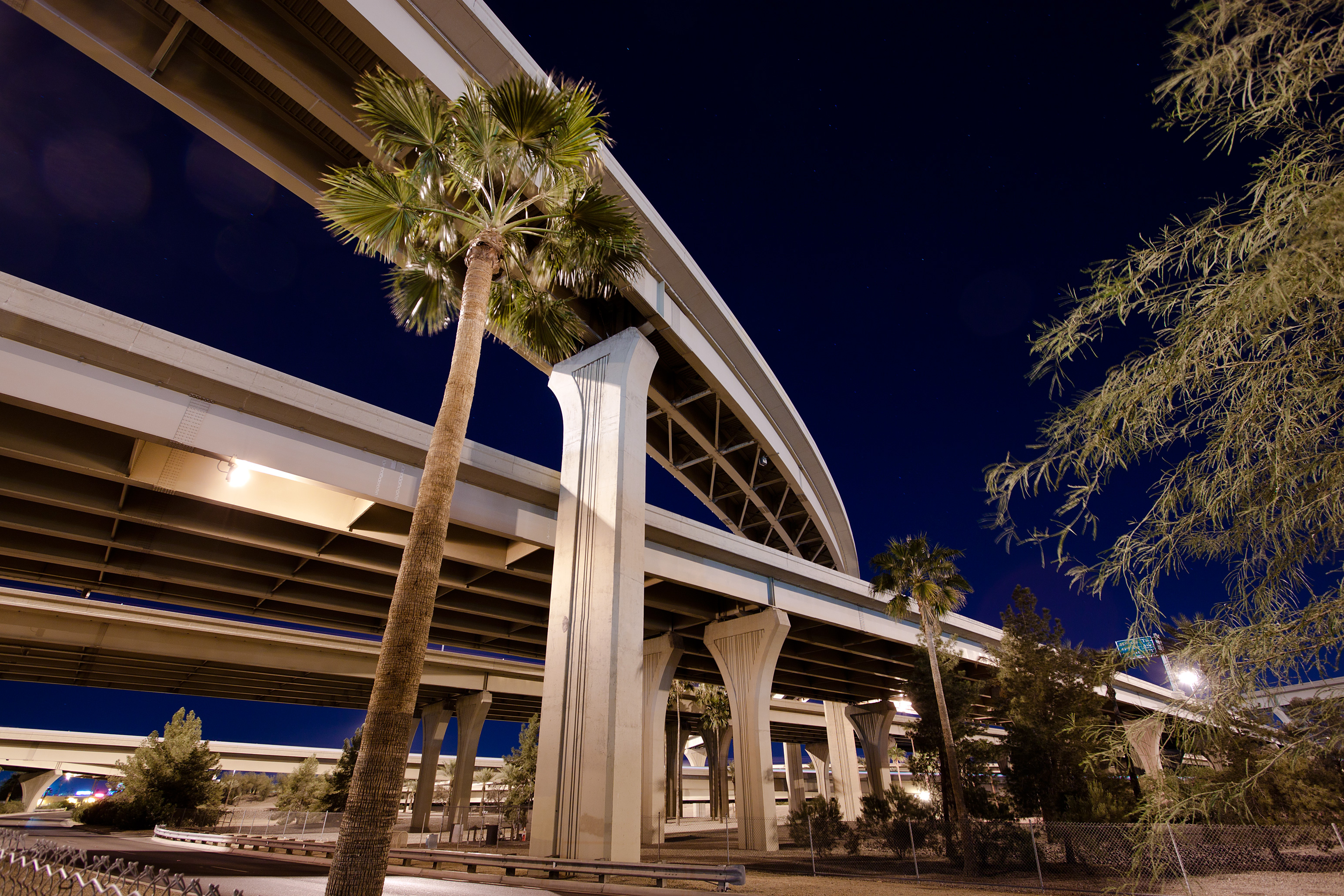
The Stack (Interstates 10 and 17) interchange at night in 2012

One reason for the lack of congestion is that the extensive freeway system is mostly funded by local rather than federal tax revenue, through a half-cent general sales tax measure approved by voters in 1985. Another product of this local funding is that Phoenix is the largest city in the United States to have at least two Interstate Highways, but no three-digit interstates.

As of 2005, the metropolitan area of Phoenix contains one of the nation's largest and fastest growing freeway systems, consisting of over 1,405 lane miles (2,261 lane km). The freeway system is a mix of Interstate, U.S., and state highways which include Interstate 10, Interstate 17, US 60, Loop 101, Loop 202, SR 51, SR 143, and Loop 303. There are still major additions to routes 101, 202 and 303 underway, as well as several other smaller projects around the valley. State Routes 87, 85, and 74 connect Phoenix with other areas of the Valley and Arizona.

The street system in Phoenix (and some of its suburbs) is laid out in a grid system, with most roads oriented either north–south or east–west, and the zero point of the grid being the intersection of Central Avenue and Washington Street. The one notable exception to this is the diagonal Grand Avenue, which runs northwest–southeast. The original plan was for the east–west streets to be named after U.S. Presidents, with the north–south streets named after Native Americans; but the north–south streets were quickly changed to numbers, with numbered Avenues running to the west of Central, and numbered Streets to its east. Major arterial streets are spaced one mile (1.6 km) apart, divided into smaller blocks approximately every 1/8 mile (200 m). For example, Scottsdale Road, being the 7200 block east, lies nine miles (14 km) to the east of Central Avenue (72 / 8).

Freeways and state highways in Phoenix:

- I-10
- I-17
- SR 51
- US 60
- SR 85
- Loop 101
- SR 143
- Loop 202
- Loop 303

==== Cycling ====
The Maricopa Association of Governments has a bicycle advisory committee working to improve conditions for bicycling on city streets and off-road paths.

=== Utilities ===
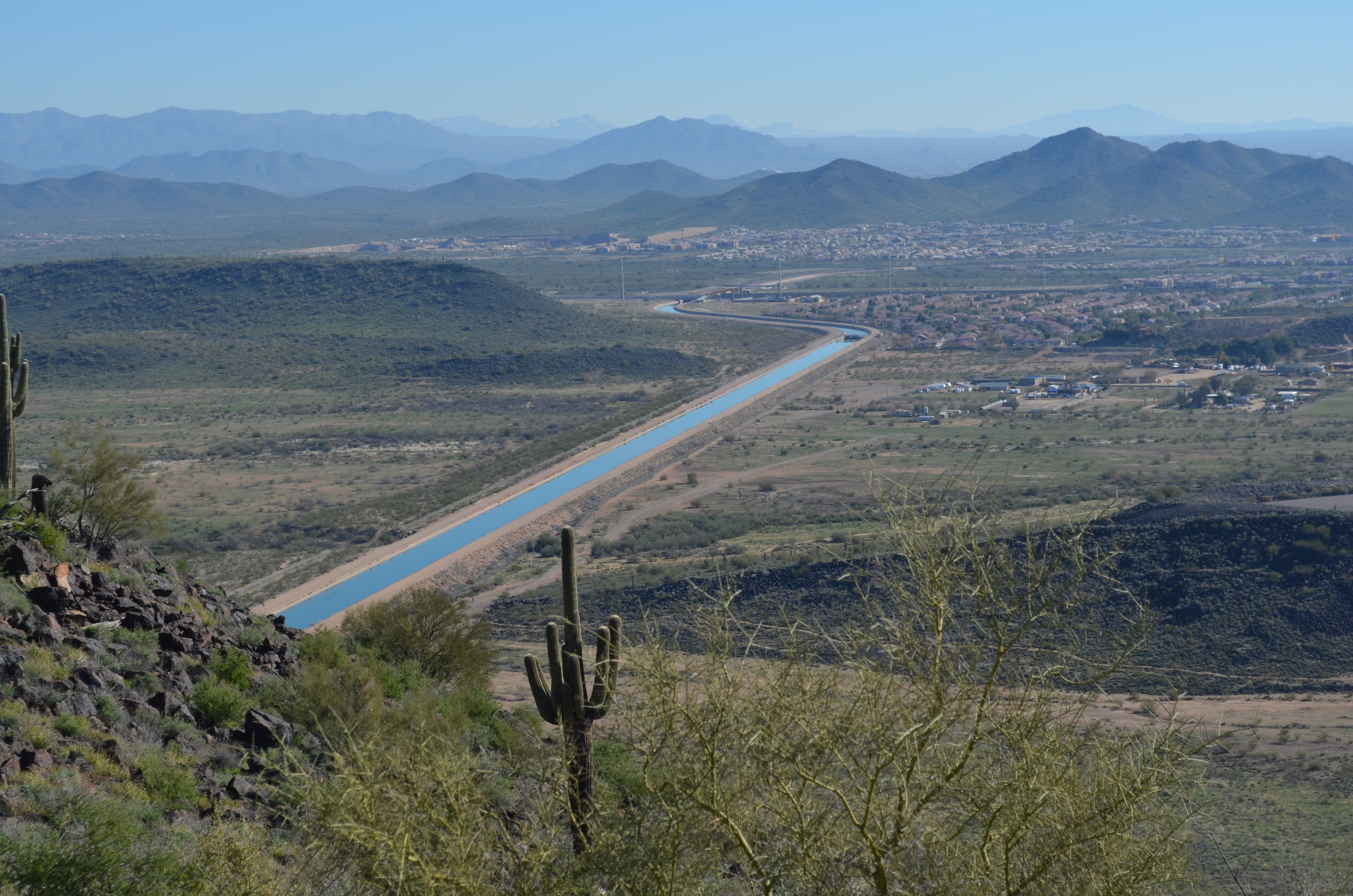
Central Arizona Project (CAP) canal

Being in the desert, Phoenix relies on a water supply delivered to the city via a system of canals which divert water from the region's rivers and lakes, with the largest portion of the city's water coming from the Colorado River through the Central Arizona Project's canal. The city's electrical needs are served primarily by Arizona Public Service, although some customers receive their electricity from the Salt River Project (SRP). The main sources of electrical generation are nuclear and coal power plants. Arizona is home to the Palo Verde Nuclear Generating Station, the largest nuclear-generating facility in the United States. SRP is also the largest water provider in Phoenix.

=== Health care ===
In 2011 (the last year for which information is available), Phoenix had a slightly younger population than the country as a whole. While the United States had 13.3% of its population over the age of 65, Phoenix's percentage stood significantly lower, at 8.1%. Phoenix's percentage of 18.8% in the next age group, 45–64 was also a great deal lower than the national average of 26.6%. This results in 73% of Phoenix's population being 44 or younger, as compared to the national percentage of 60.

In 2010 (the last year for nationally reported figures), Phoenix was at or below national levels for most reportable diseases, with the exception of both hepatitis A and B, where they were slightly over the national average (0.8 and 1.8 to 0.5 and 1.1%, respectively).

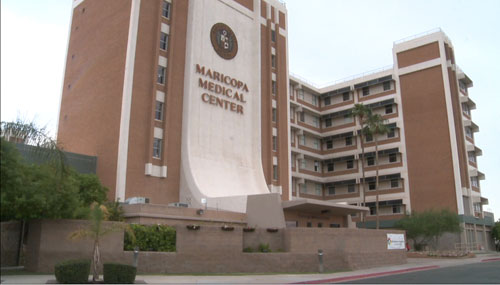
Maricopa Medical Center

In most major categories, Phoenix had a lower incidence of death than the rest of the nation. Only deaths due to Alzheimer's (29.7 to 27.2 deaths per 100,000) and pre-natal conditions (5.3 to 3.8 deaths per 100,000) were slightly above the national average. Deaths due to HIV and liver disease were exactly at the national average of 2.5 and 10.8 respectively. However, in several major categories, Phoenix had significantly lower indices of death: deaths by cancer stood at only 57% (106) of the national average of 184.6 deaths per 100,000; deaths due to heart disease, 56.1% of the national rate of 249.8 per 100,000. Cancer and heart disease were the two top causes of death in the country.

Low-weight births (7.5%) were below the national average of 8.1%, yet infant mortality (7.2‰ [per thousand]) was higher than the rest of the U.S. (6.1‰). Births to teen mothers were significantly higher than the rest of the country, sitting at 12.2% as compared to 8.4% nationally.

The Phoenix metropolitan area is serviced by 56 hospitals and medical centers. The Mayo Clinic is a not-for-profit medical practice and medical research group based in Rochester, Minnesota. Phoenix is one of two other locations with Mayo Clinic campuses (the other being Jacksonville, Florida). It is the first and largest integrated not-for-profit medical group practice in the world.

St. Joseph's Hospital and Medical Center is part of Dignity Health (formerly Catholic Healthcare West), one of the largest healthcare systems in the western United States. St. Joseph's is a not-for-profit hospital with special advocacy for the poor and underserved. John C. Lincoln North Mountain Hospital is a general medical and surgical hospital. The Phoenix Children's Hospital is a 425-bed children's teaching hospital. Arizona Heart Institute, opened in 1971, is known internationally as one of the first freestanding outpatient clinics dedicated exclusively to cardiovascular health.

Banner Health is a non-profit health system in the United States, based in Phoenix. It operates 23 hospitals as well as specialized facilities. The health system is the largest employer in Arizona, employing more than 43,440. Banner Health was created in 1999 through a merger of Lutheran Health Systems, based in North Dakota, and Samaritan Health System, based in Phoenix.

Barrow Neurological Institute (BNI) at St. Joseph's Hospital and Medical Center is the world's largest dedicated neurosurgical center and a leader in neurosurgical training, research, and patient care.

Valleywise Health is a public hospital and healthcare system based in Phoenix with Community Heath Centers located throughout Maricopa County, Arizona. Valleywise Health includes the Valleywise Health Medical Center, the renowned Diane & Bruce Halle Arizona Burn Center, the Comprehensive Health Center, three Behavioral Health Centers and a network of Community Health Centers located throughout Maricopa County. Valleywise Health is the areas largest public teaching hospital and is a founding partner in the Creighton University Arizona Health Education Alliance. In 2024, Valleywise Health opened its new 10-story 240 bed Valleywise Medical Center on its Roosevelt Campus near downtown Phoenix. On the November 4, 2025 general election, the voters of Maricopa County approved Proposition 409 - a $898 million Valleywise Health measure to expand behavioral health services, rebuild and expand Community Health Centers and to replace the Comprehensive Health Center.

== Sister cities ==
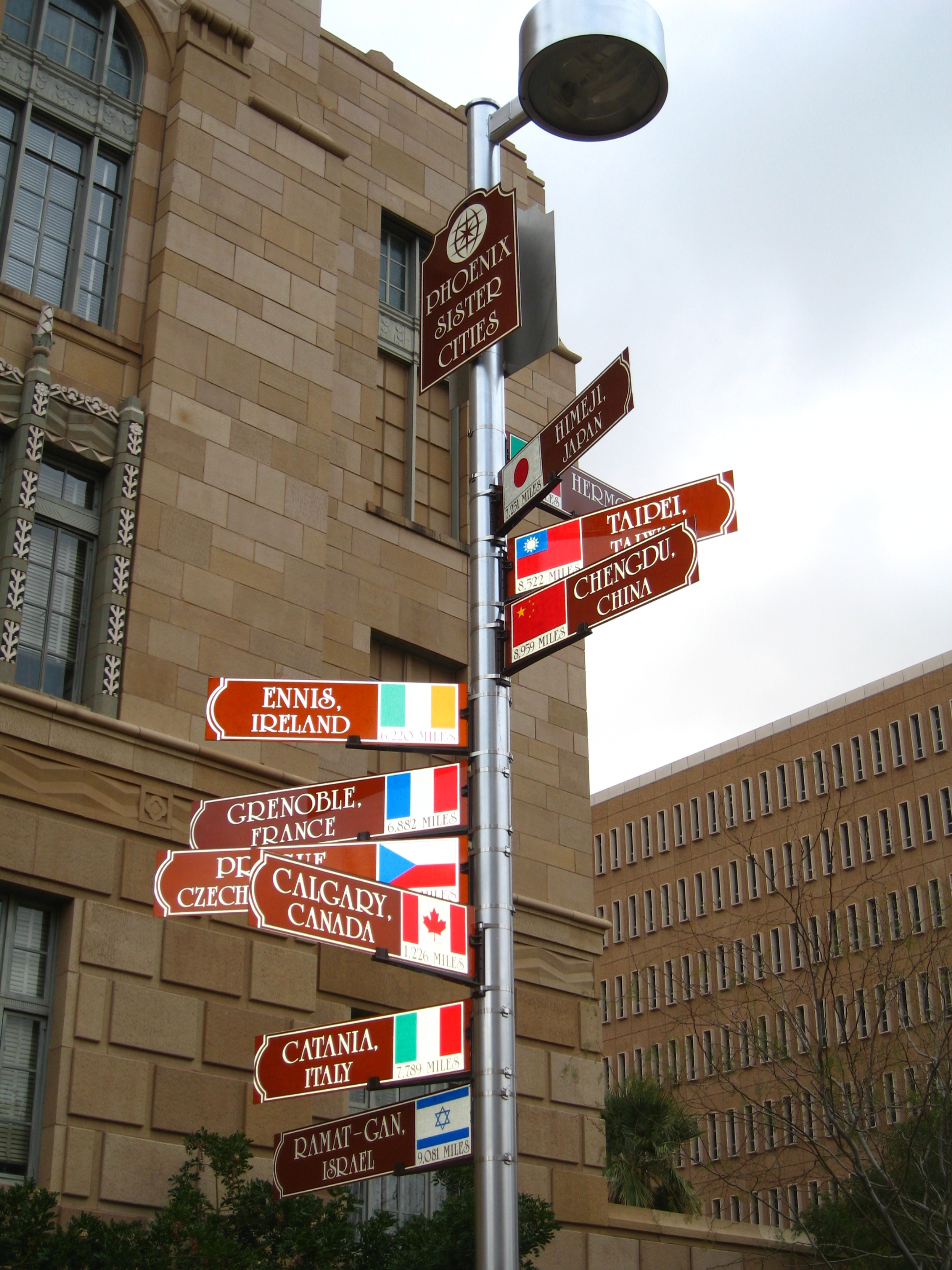
Signpost showing Phoenix's sister cities

With the creation of the Phoenix Sister Cities (PSC) organization in 1972, Phoenix became a member of the international Sister City movement. They filed for Articles of Incorporation in 1975, and entered into their first Sister City agreement in 1976 with Hermosillo, Mexico. The organization's mission statement states their purpose is to "foster relationships between the people of Phoenix and our Sister Cities around the world to promote friendship, peace and prosperity."

Phoenix has eleven sister cities. Phoenix and Prague have shared a capital cities relationship since May 1991, which was expanded to sister city status in 2013.

- Calgary, Canada (1997)
- Catania, Italy (2001)
- Chengdu, China (1987)
- (Republic of Ireland) Ennis, Ireland (1988)
- Grenoble, France (1990)
- Hermosillo, Mexico (1976)
- Himeji, Japan (1976)
- Prague, Czech Republic (2013)
- Ramat Gan, Israel (2005)
- Suwon, South Korea (2022)
- Taipei, Taiwan (1979)

== See also ==
- 6th Avenue Hotel-Windsor Hotel
- El Cid Castle
- Largest cities in the Americas
- List of historic properties in Phoenix
- List of tallest buildings in Phoenix
- Pioneer and Military Memorial Park
- USS Arizona salvaged artifacts
- USS Phoenix, at least 3 ships
- Category:People from Phoenix, Arizona
