= Chandler Regional Medical Center =

- Dignity Health

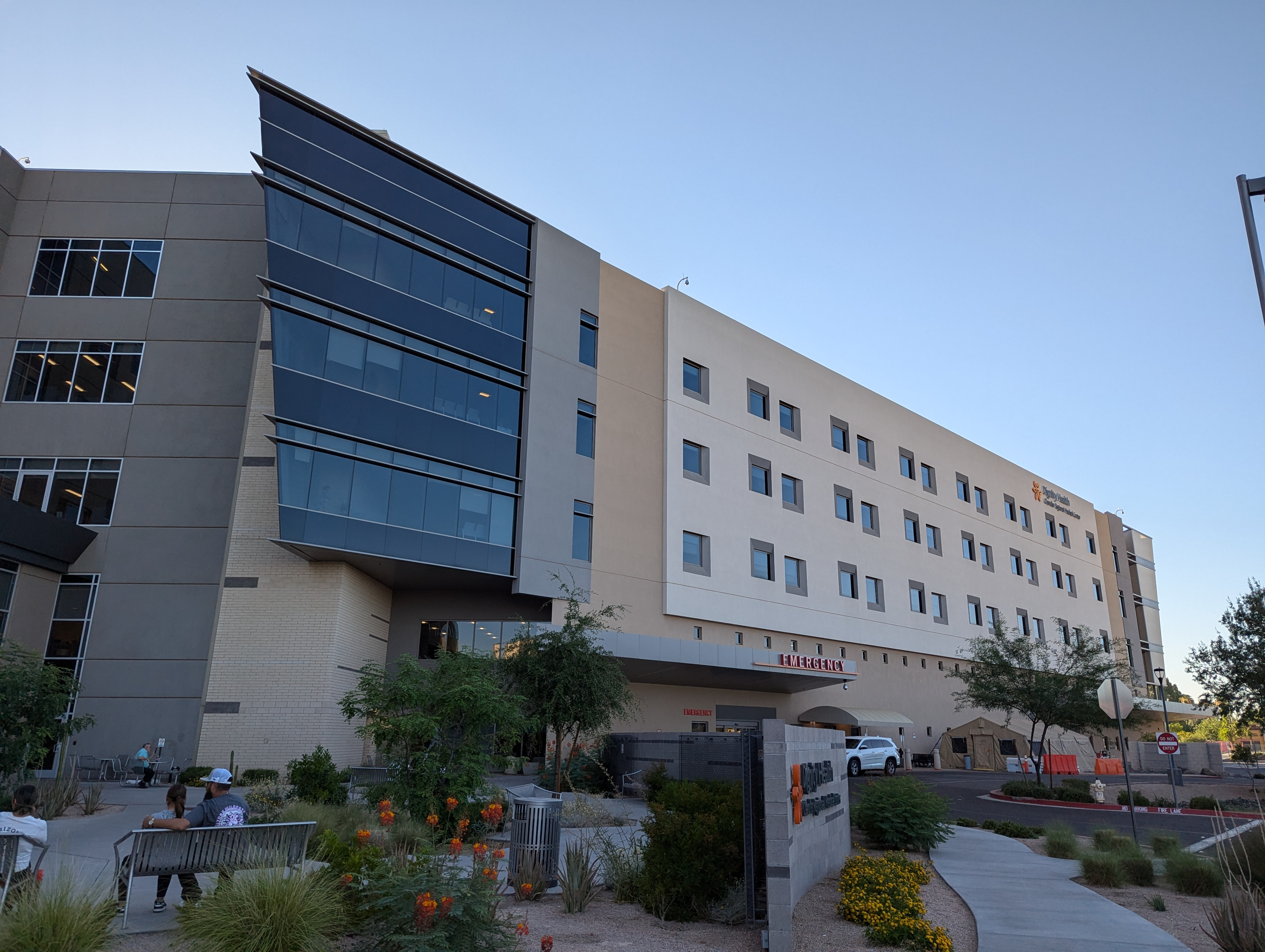
- Tower C and the emergency department entrance

Geography
- Location: 1955 W Frye Rd (at Dobson Rd), Chandler, Arizona, United States
- Coordinates: 33.297212°N 111.874652°W

Organization
- Type: Teaching

Services
- Emergency department: Level I trauma center
- Beds: 429

Helipads
- Helipad: FAA LID: AZ76
Number	Length		Surface
Number	ft	m	Surface
H1	60 x 60	18 × 18	asphalt

History
- Opened: July 17, 1961

Links
- Website: www.dignityhealth.org/arizona/locations/chandlerregional
- Lists: Hospitals in Arizona

Chandler Regional Medical Center is a full-service, acute care, not-for-profit hospital in Chandler, Arizona, United States, providing healthcare to the East Valley of Phoenix. Services offered include cardiovascular, emergency care with a Level I trauma center, family birth center, gastroenterology, pediatric and adolescent, sleep center, orthopedics, and diagnostic services. The hospital is a member of Dignity Health.

The hospital opened as Chandler Community Hospital in 1961 as a 42-bed hospital located east of downtown Chandler. It quickly became poorly placed and too small for the large population growth in the 1970s and early 1980s. After a multiple-year effort, the hospital relocated to its Frye and Dobson Rd. site in 1984 with a new 120-bed facility. After merging into Catholic Healthcare West, the predecessor of Dignity Health, in 1999, a second tower was constructed to nearly double the number of beds. Subsequent expansions in 2014 and 2021 raised the number of beds to 429 in four patient towers and provided the facilities for Level I trauma center status. Although part of Dignity Health, Chandler Regional is not a Catholic hospital.

== History ==
=== As a community hospital ===
By the late 1950s, Chandler had no hospital, and the nearest such facility was in Mesa. As a result, a movement began supporting the establishment of a local hospital to serve the community. In June 1958, the state authorized a hospital district to include the area from Chandler to Queen Creek, which at the time contained 23,000 people—not counting residents and employees of Williams Air Force Base.

Construction began by early 1960, after the federal government approved building plans and released funding under the Hill–Burton Act. Chandler Community Hospital admitted its first patient on July 17, 1961. It was originally located along McQueen Road south of Williams Field Road (Note: Now Chandler Boulevard) and cost $650,000 to build. The emergency room was not staffed around-the-clock; a patient needing to be admitted after hours had to ring a buzzer and wait for a doctor to be available.

=== Relocation to Dobson and Frye ===
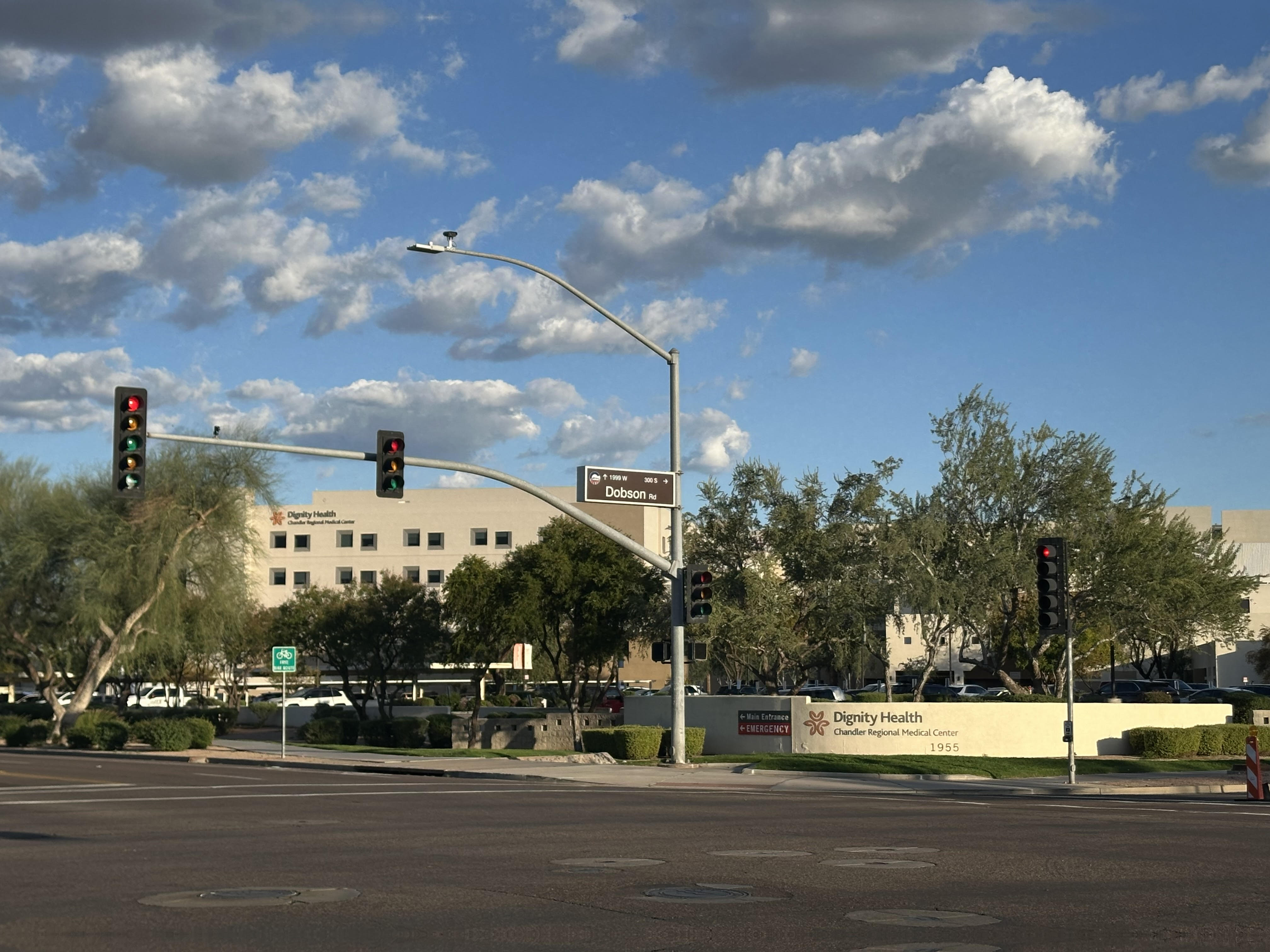
Chandler Regional Medical Center as viewed from the northwest corner of Dobson and Frye roads

By the start of the 1980s, the original Chandler Community Hospital facility had become poorly placed for the community's growth, hindering its prominence in the area. It had never been expanded and still featured one operating room, one X-ray room, and six private rooms. Rapid population growth meant an increased use of the facility; between 1970 and 1981, the number of emergency room patients nearly doubled, and outpatient visits increased 77 percent. Competing priorities strained the existing facility; for instance, the obstetrics unit had been closed in 1979 and replaced with an intensive care unit, only for hospital leadership to soon sense a need for a birthing facility to serve a younger local population. In June 1981, the hospital began seeking state approval to construct a new facility on land at Dobson and Frye roads.

After an agreement with St. Luke's Hospital in Phoenix allayed opposition from Desert Samaritan Hospital, the new, 120-bed Chandler Community Hospital received bond approval in December 1981 and state regulatory approval in February 1982.

The new Chandler Community Hospital was dedicated in February 1984 and admitted its first patients the next month. Other patients were moved to the new hospital; one patient in traction had to be transferred by moving truck, and patients in the intensive care unit were relocated by helicopter. At 148,600 square feet (13,810 m^{2}), it was far larger than the 22,140-square-foot (2,057 m^{2}) building it replaced. In the early years at the new facility, roads to the site remained dirt because real estate growth in the area had unexpectedly slowed. Chandler Community Hospital was renamed Chandler Regional Hospital in 1987 as part of an effort by management to emphasize that it served areas beyond the city of Chandler proper.

=== Merger with Catholic Healthcare West ===
Beginning in the late 1990s, a wave of hospital mergers swept through Phoenix. The independent Chandler Regional Hospital attracted attention from regional and national suitors; during this time, its president, Kaylor Shemberger, came under scrutiny due to financial difficulties at the hospital's associated physician hospital organization. In December 1999, Chandler Regional merged into Catholic Healthcare West (CHW), under an arrangement that saw it remain a non-Catholic hospital. CHW paid off $51.5 million in hospital bonds and assumed $30 million in debt in the merger, which brought Chandler Regional under the same ownership as St. Joseph's Hospital and Medical Center in Phoenix. It also gave the hospital access to the buying and negotiating power of the CHW system in purchasing and contracts with insurers.

Shortly after the acquisition, CHW launched an expansion plan for Chandler Regional. The $20 million plan called for expanding the hospital by 45,000 square feet (4,200 m^{2}), adding twelve treatment rooms in the emergency room and creating a women's center, among other improvements. Tower B opened in 2002, adding 140,000 square feet (13,000 m^{2}) and bringing the facility to 205 beds. Chandler Regional Hospital was renamed Chandler Regional Medical Center in 2007.

The structure of CHW (later Dignity Health)'s affiliation with Chandler Regional is defined by the Common Values for Community Partnership, which outlined standards for non-Catholic community hospitals within the system. While the standards forbid the hospital from offering abortion, euthanasia, or in vitro fertilization, Chandler Regional continued to offer tubal ligation, which Catholic hospitals do not allow, after the merger. The status of Chandler Regional as a non-Catholic hospital within CHW became a point of contention between the hospital system and the Bishop of Phoenix, Thomas Olmsted. In 2010, Olmsted declared St. Joseph's no longer Catholic following what he called a failure of the hospital to abide by Catholic directives. A letter to CHW on the matter also cited Chandler Regional; Olmsted told CHW president Lloyd Dean, "The irony of our present state of affairs is that an organization that identifies itself as 'Catholic' is operating a hospital in my diocese that does not abide" by church guidelines.

In 2007, the hospital announced an expansion to include a third patient tower including an expanded intensive care unit and chapel, as well as expanded cardiac catheterization labs. The addition was delayed by CHW until 2010, when construction began. During the project, Chandler Regional announced it would pursue Level I trauma center designation, becoming the first such facility in the East Valley and fulfilling a longtime goal of local public officials. Tower C opened in August 2014 at a cost of $125 million, adding 96 beds and bringing the total to 339; it provided the necessary equipment and facilities for trauma care, including a dedicated trauma operating room. During the construction of the tower, in 2012, CHW changed its name to Dignity Health.

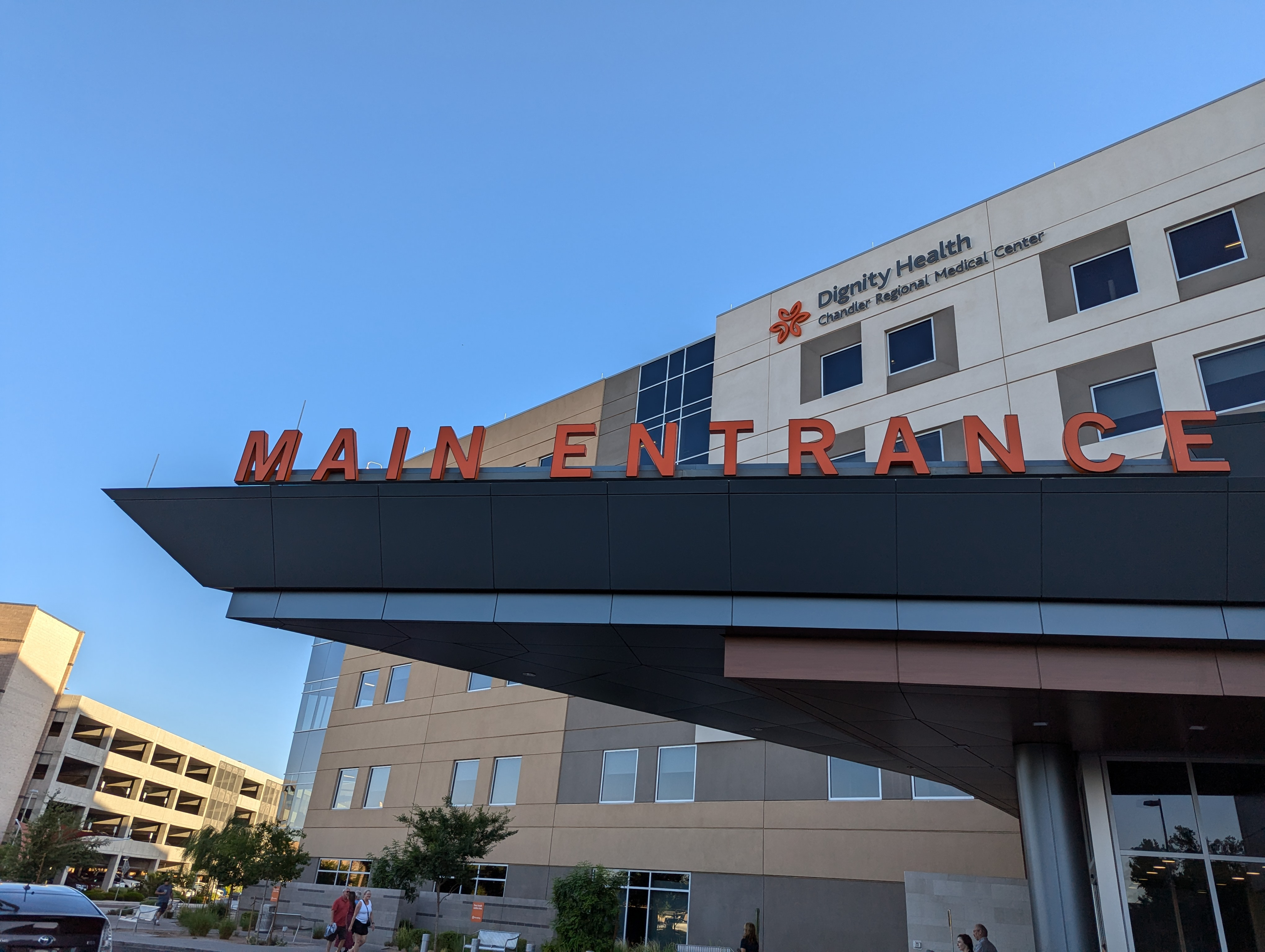
Tower D, completed in 2021, added a new main entrance.

The five-story Tower D opened in July 2021 after four years of planning and construction, bringing the hospital to 429 patient beds including facilities for thoracic care and an expanded ICU. A four-story parking garage was built to compensate for parking spaces lost to the new tower's footprint. Tower C was renovated in tandem with the Tower D project.
