= San Marcos Hotel =

Historic place in Chandler, Arizona

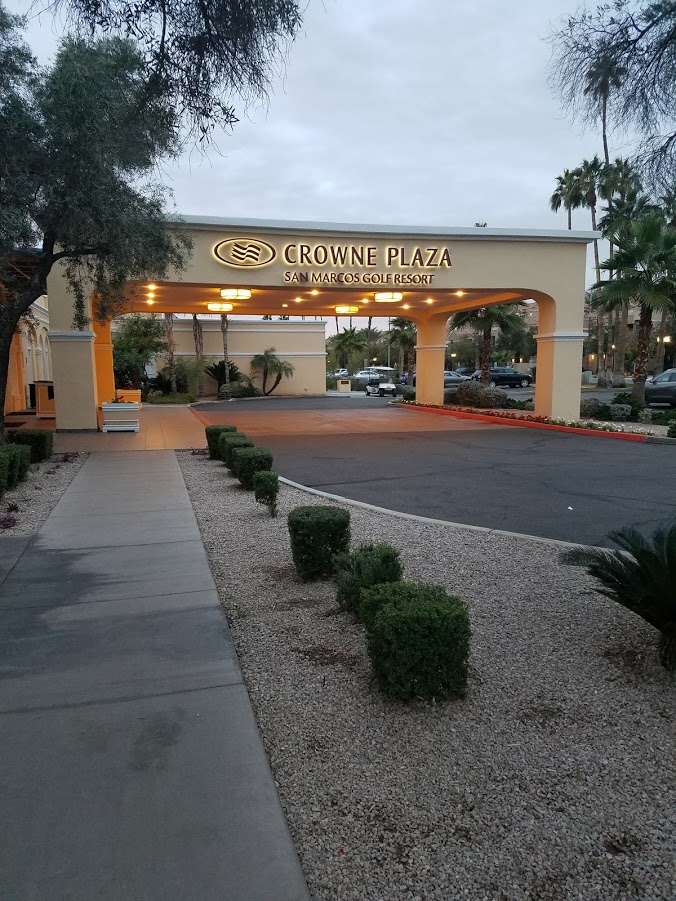
- San Marcos Hotel in Chandler, Arizona
- Interactive map of the San Marcos Hotel area
- Hotel chain: Crowne Plaza Hotel and Resorts

General information
- Location: 1 N SAN MARCOS PLACE, CHANDLER, AZ 85225, Chandler
- Coordinates: 33.304299°N 111.842490°W
- Construction started: 1912
- Opened: November 1913.
- Owner: Lester Hospitality http://www.lesterhospitality.com/

Other information
- Number of rooms: 249
- Number of restaurants: 2
- Number of bars: 1

Website
- http://www.sanmarcosresort.com/
- San Marcos Hotel
- U.S. National Register of Historic Places
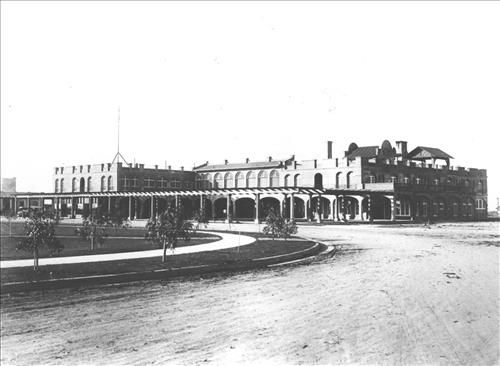

- Location within Arizona
- Location: Chandler, Arizona
- Coordinates: 33.304299°N 111.842490°W
- Architect: Arthur Burnett Benton, Myron Hunt
- NRHP reference No.: 82002078
- Added to NRHP: April 29, 1982

The San Marcos Hotel is located on one of the prime corners of the original 1912 Chandler Townsite, at the northwest corner of San Marcos Place and Commonwealth Avenue and faces east onto San Marcos Plaza, the center of Chandler, Arizona. Operated by InterContinental Hotels Group's Crowne Plaze brand, the hotel is owned by Interwest Capital after having been acquired in 2013. The hotel was conceived by Dr. A.J. Chandler and subsequently named for Fray Marcos de Niza, the first European to enter the Salt River Valley in 1512. The hotel opened with great fanfare in 1913, with Vice President Thomas Marshall in attendance. The hotel promised the most modern in efficient accommodations, such as incandescent light bulbs, telephones in every room, and more than 3 miles of copper wire. When it opened, the San Marcos hotel was the only electrified building in Chandler, Arizona. In 2012, Kansas-based Ottawa University confirmed that it was exploring the potential of purchasing the San Marcos hotel with the intention of converting it into a residential campus.

The resort was originally conceived as a winter getaway for celebrities, dignitaries, and luminaries.

== Architecture ==
The two story reinforced concrete hotel has offset rectangular massing with Mission Revival details. Designed within the geometry of a 17 foot by 17 foot structural grid, the Irregular plan fits within a rectangle measuring 187 feet by 221 feet. Distinctive features include the uniquely detailed structural system, flat roofs with parapet embattlements, arcades with segmental arches, and towers topped with red tile roofs and curve linear parapets. The portion of the hotel constructed in 1912 and 1913 was viewed as only an initial phase of development by Dr. A.J. Chandler, the owner, and Arthur B, Benton, the architect: "The hotel building will be of reinforced concrete construction and will have all the latest improvements in hotel buildings. Many of the rooms will be provided with private sleeping balconies. The portion which is to be built at once includes 35 guest rooms, but plans for the entire structure of about 200 rooms are outlined and so arranged that construction of additional wings and stories can proceed without interfering in any way with the hotel business". The original portion of the hotel is Z-shaped with the north wing placed on the corner of the block north to south, (68 feet by 136 feet) extending west and the south wing placed right up to the southeast corner of the block, (68 feet by 119 feet) extending east. The connecting wing (measuring 51 feet by 85 feet) ts slightly higher but compatible. In plan and elevation the building reflects the original Intention of extending wings to the north and construction of at least one additional floor, with the unusual parapet embattlements really nothing more than the base for the next story. Major additions never occurred because additional rooms were gained by constructing clustered "Bungalows," eventually numbering 30 to the west of the main hotel building. The open spaces formed by the building mass to the northeast and southwest became a patio and a garden respectively. The patio was framed on the north and east by a pergola constructed of Tuscan columns and heavy timber trellis work. The pergola also extended around the east and south facades of the south wing, but only the north portion remains, enclosed as office space. The main image of the building is one of continuous but varied solid and void juxtapositions, with all voids topped by semicircular or segmental arches. On the ground floor this is expressed in the continuous Inset arcade along the south and west sides of the patio leading to the hotel entry. The segmental arches have square piers with beveled corners and corbelled imposts at the spring line. A passageway connects through the building to the west garden and originally connected south through the middle of the south wing to the street. As originally constructed the exterior of the hotel was concrete gray in color with either the raw structure, expressing both its wooden framework and simple Mission Revival detailing, or the Portland cement stucco, used over brick to infill some areas of the structural grid, visible. The most progressive and interesting features of the structural system are the monolithic cast-in-place floor and ceiling slabs, which feature elongated and repetitive arched coving, expressive of the Mission Revival. These were originally painted, on the interior, with Indian and Spanish American motifs.

== National Register of Historic Places ==
In January 1982, James W. Garrison (Historical Architect), James W. Woodward (Architectural Historian), Cindy Myers (Historical Archaeologist), Sylvia Bender-Lamb (Historical Geographer) submitted the hotel to the Arizona State Historic Preservation Office citing national significance of Architecture and Community Planning. On March 1, 1982, the Arizona State Historic Preservation Officer, Ann Pritzlaff, submitted the nomination form to the National Park Service and on April 27, 1982, was entered into the National Register of Historic Places. The San Marcos Hotel was entered into the NRHP citing architectural and community planning significance.

=== Architectural significance ===
==== Stylistic treatment ====
The hotel is an example of integrated Mission Revival design in Arizona where stylistic qualities are expressed throughout the building and not simply applied as ornamentation.

==== Method of construction ====
The hotel is one of the earliest reinforced cast-in-place concrete structures in Arizona.

==== Community planning ====
The hotel is the only building constructed entirely within the original planning and aesthetic concept of Chandler as planned "City Beautiful".

=== Community planning significance ===
==== Dr. A.J. Chandler ====
Dr. Alexander John Chandler, the first veterinary surgeon in the Arizona Territory, gradually acquired 18,000 acres of land where he raised cattle, sheep, ostriches, and alfalfa. On May 17, 1912, Dr. Chandler opened the townsite office. The town consisted of only three buildings at the time: the townsite office, a dining hall, and the Morrison Grocery. Dr. Chandler hired Arthur Burnett Benton to design the hotel and served as President of the San Marcos Hotel Corporation even through the 1930s when he sold the hotel due to The Depression

==== Will H. and Grace Perley Robinson ====
Will and Grace Robinson were hired by Dr. Chandler as exterior and interior managers, respectively, after having worked at the Ingleside Inn in Phoenix for five years. Mrs. Robinson was credited as the San Marcos' hostess and Mr. Robinson supervised the construction of the hotel's original golf course. Mr. Robinson's study of Native Americans in the United States informed and was reflected by the hotel's decorative scheme. Many artifacts from his personal collection, in fact, were placed throughout the hotel. The Robinsons retired from the hotel in 1932 after 19 years.

==== Arthur Burnett Benton ====
Arthur Burnett Benton was the American Architect credited with designing the hotel. Having designed structures in Riverside, California and Santa Barbara, California, Benton was hired by Dr. Chandler to design the San Marcos hotel which is the only Benton design in Arizona.

==== Myron Hunt ====
Myron Hunt was a Los Angeles architect hired by Dr. Chandler in 1924 to oversee additions to the hotel and the design of the sixteen bungalows west of the hotel. Hunt is credited with designing several hotels along the Pacific Coast and the Rose Bowl (stadium) in Pasadena, California. Respecting the design concepts and structural systems of Arthur Benton before him, Hunt was sensitive to working out the additions to the hotel.

==== Winter Resort Development ====
When the San Marcos Hotel was built in 1913, Arizona had two other winter resorts in operation: the Castle Hot Springs (Arizona) Hotel and the Ingleside Inn. The Castle Hot Springs hotel was outside of the Salt River Valley and therefore inaccessible to the broader tourist and the Ingleside Inn was a private club and though these hotels were in operation, the San Marcos Hotel was designed as a luxurious winter resort for the wealthy. The hotel served as the prototype of the southwestern winter resort with little competition until the late 1920s when the Wigwam in Litchfield Park, Arizona, Jokake Inn, the Biltmore, and the Camelback in Phoenix, Arizona were built. Dr. Chandler's foresight in resort development and planning in the Arizona desert, provided the Salt River Valley a potential for growth at the time statehood was granted.

== Timeline of the San Marcos Hotel ==
Date	Event
May 1912	Contract for construction awarded to Los Angeles firm of Sears and Galbreath
Aug 1912	Weaver Construction Company of Los Angeles now in charge. Shipping delays hold up progress. All of town waiting.
Oct 1912	All materials on hand. Real work commences.
Dec 1912	Up to third floor
Jan 1913	Interior work begins as all is now under cover. Finest electrical wiring.
Feb 1913	Planting lawn to south. Pouring concrete columns for pergola—each over one ton. Interior materials—doors, windows, casings, frames, counter, etc.—all from L.A.
Mar 1913	As much as possible run by electricity: vacuum cleaner, meat chopper, coffee grinder, dishwasher, stoves, warming plates. All wiring underground. 1,500 electric lights.
Jul 1913	$50,000 spent on interior furnishing. Color schemes by Mrs. Chandler. Interior designer William Loftus of Los Angeles. Many items from Eastern showings.
Aug 1913	Mrs. William Robinson named manager.
Sep 1913	Work on 100-acre golf links begins. Putting greens adjacent to town near railroad depot. Will have water hazards, unusual in Arizona. Harry Collis and Will Robinson, designers. Located at the end of Commonwealth Street
Nov 1913	Formal opening of the hotel. 500 in attendance. Newspaperman's day precedes public viewing. Social elite in attendance. Excursion train and automobiles. Buffet supper and dancing.
Mar 1914	Country club formed to promote golf links. 9 holes with sand and oil greens. Also cooperate in upkeep of course. Open to locals.
Apr 1914	Crude oil used instead of coal or wood in hotel: cheaper and less injurious.
Jun 1914	San Marcos Summer Club for area residents. Collapsible motion picture screen at the south end of roof—said to be the largest in the southwest. Nominal membership plus credentials. Roof garden parties twice a week with motion pictures, dancing and food.
Jul 1914	Bermuda grass seeded on golf course. Move hole #1 east of Halstead Lumber Co. on Commonwealth Canal. Relocate Mexicans living there. Benches to be put in shade for spectators.
Sep 1914	Block to west to become parking, walks, flower gardens. Remove unsightly buildings. Vines will be planted to cover newspaper office.
Nov 1914	Tent houses near Chandler Arizonan will be replaced by bungalows. Korean houseboys return for another season.
Dec 1914	Cashman contracts to do tennis courts. Croquet grounds to go in space on north.
Oct 1915	Bill Huggett now permanent guide for hotel.
Mar 1916	Two-story hotel on Alabama, planned by Will Robinson and Harry Collis as annex to San Marcos. To be called the Saguaro Clubhouse.
Sep 1916	8 bungalows to be built. Martin and Gillis of Los Angeles successful contractors; designed by Reginald D. Johnson, one of California's most distinguished architects. Just west of the hotel. To be built in ellipse form with sunken gardens, walks, etc. pool at center. Play field and wading pool for children at far west edge. Teahouse at northeast of putting green and tennis court. Cottages will have bath, living room, bedrooms, porch, red tile roof white stucco, green shutters. Park designed by Paul Thiene, designer of San Diego Exposition grounds.
1920	H. W. Easton becomes manager.
Dec 1923	Steam heat throughout hotel
Mar 1928	Dedication of hotel taxi airport. 80 acres adjoining municipal limits of Chandler. Operated by hotel, but open to all planes.
May 1928	Close of most successful season to date – 18th year. Announcement of presidential candidacy by Frank Lowden of Illinois at San Marcos. Championship concrete tennis courts.
Nov 1928	New golf course laid out by Harry Collis and William Watson of Los Angeles. Sprinkler system for watering.
Feb 1931	Additional cottages constructed, designed by Phoenix architect.

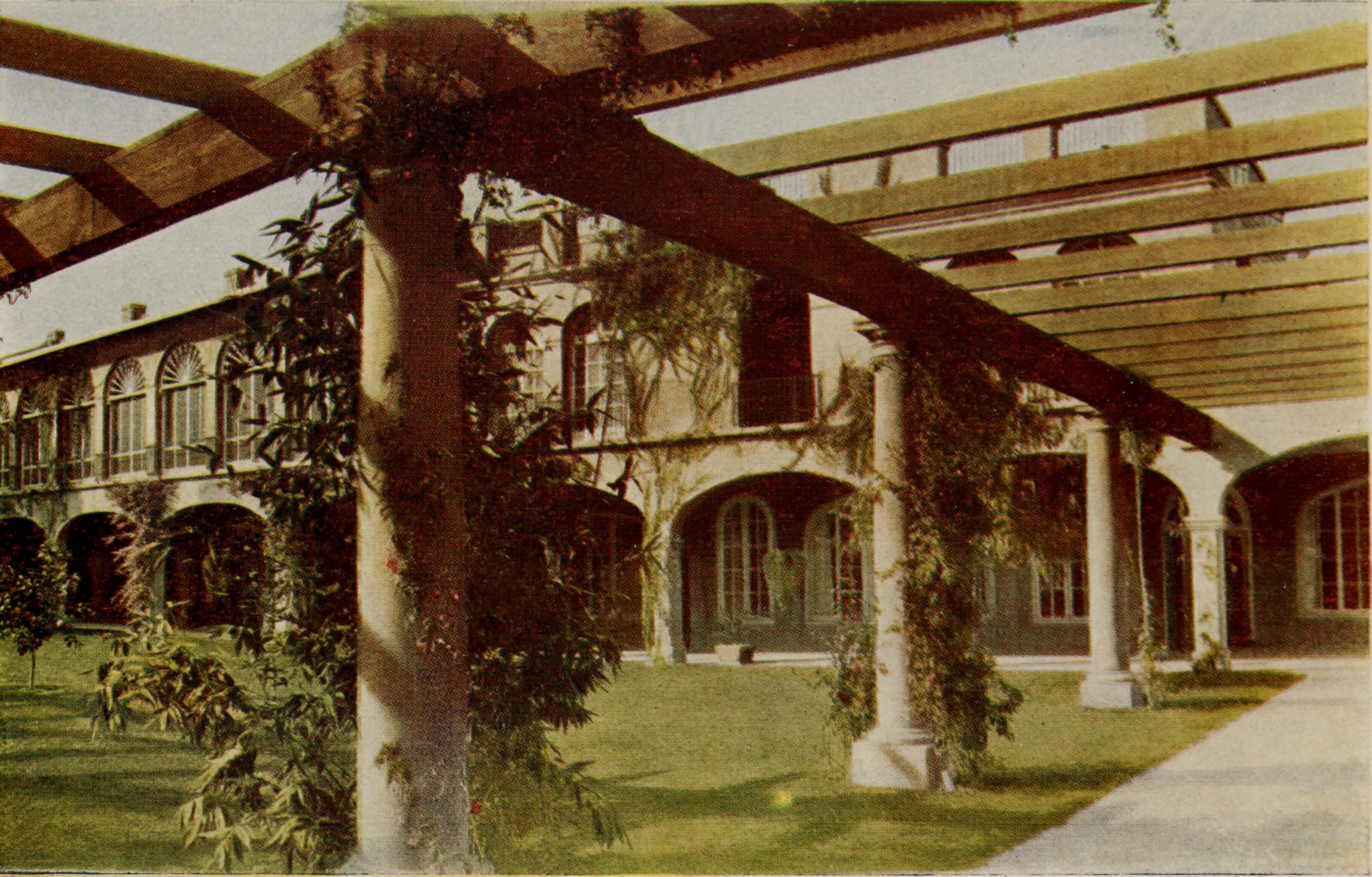

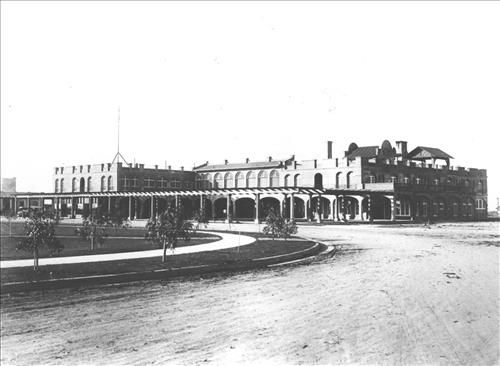

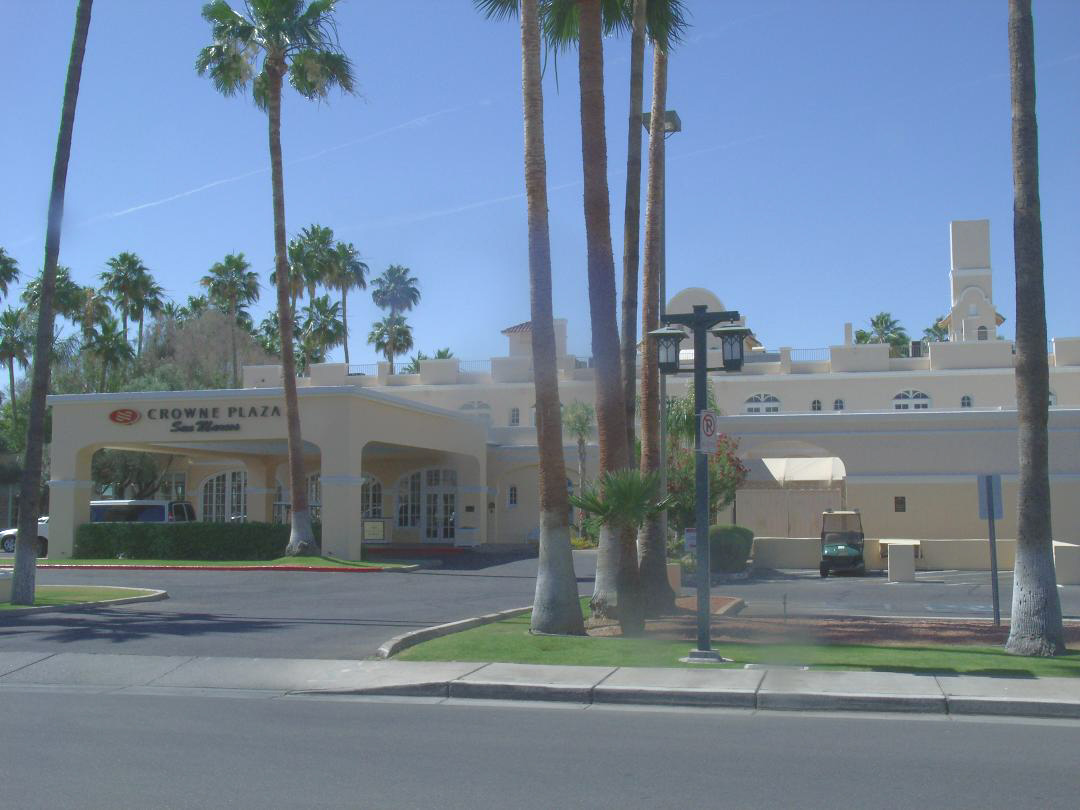
