= WCOM =

WCOM may refer to:

- WCOM-FM, a radio station (90.7 FM) licensed to serve Kendall, New York, United States
- WCOM-LP, a radio station (103.5 FM) licensed to serve Chapel Hill, North Carolina, United States
- WCGP, a radio station (89.3 FM) licensed to serve Silver Creek, New York, which held the call sign WCOM-FM from 2010 to 2023
- WMFD-TV, a television station (channel 12/virtual 68) licensed to serve Mansfield, Ohio, United States, which held the call sign WCOM-TV from 1987 to 1989

== See also ==
- MCI Inc., successor to WorldCom, whose stock symbol used to be WCOM
- Woman's Club of Mesa (WCOM)
- Woman's Club of Minneapolis (WCOM)
