= McCullough–Price House =

Historic house in Arizona, United States

- U.S. National Register of Historic Places
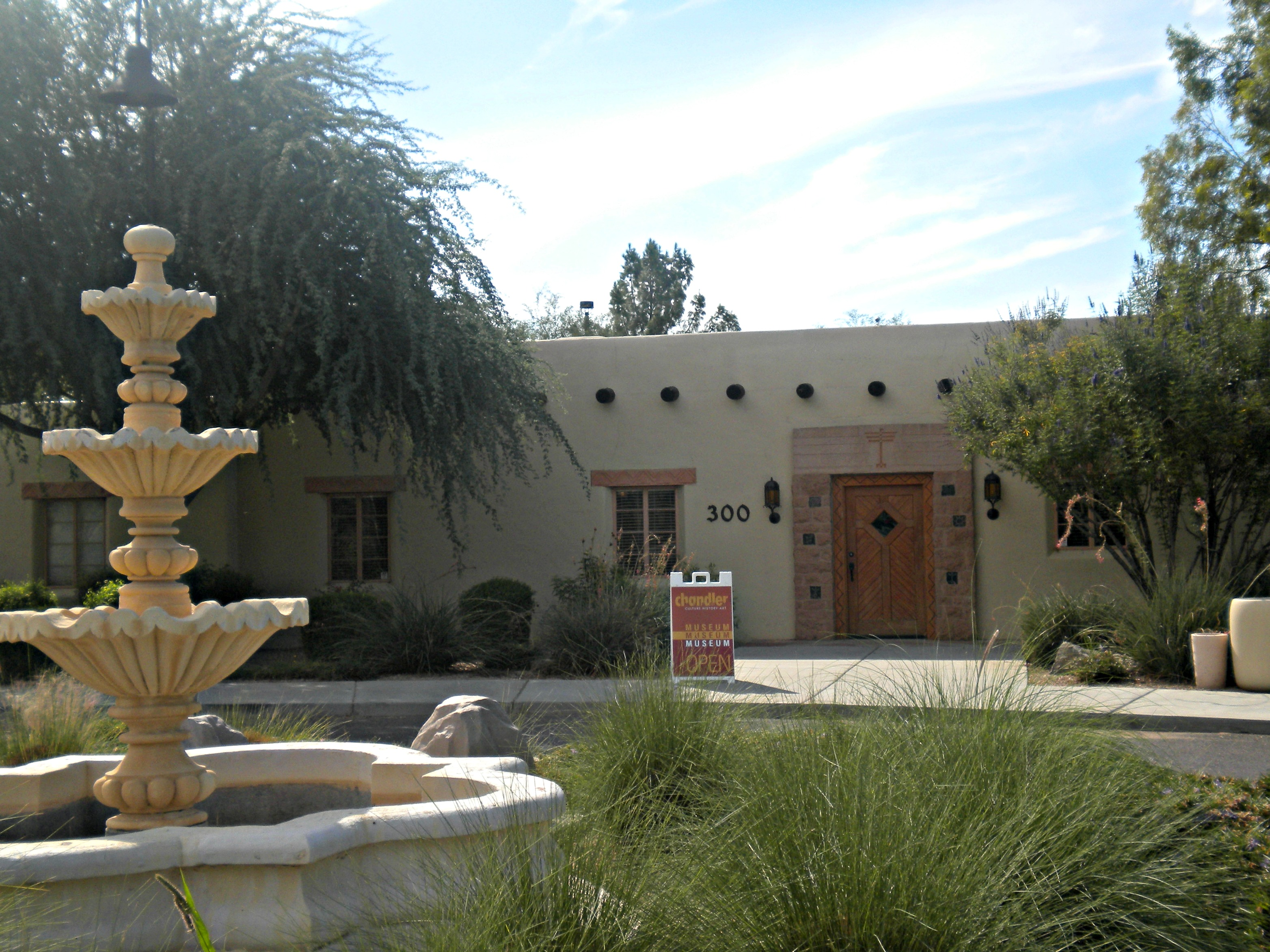

- Location within Arizona Location within the United States
- Interactive map showing the location of McCullougu Price House Museum
- Location: 300 S. Chandler Village Drive, Chandler, Arizona (Note: The street address was created in conjunction with the opening of Chandler Fashion Center. It is not original.)
- Coordinates: 33°17′52.404″N 111°54′8.604″W
- Area: 1.5 acres (0.61 ha)
- Built: 1938
- Architect: Lescher & Mahoney; Mougeot, J.W.
- Architectural style: Pueblo Revival
- NRHP reference No.: 09000311
- Added to NRHP: May 20, 2009

The McCullough–Price House is a pueblo revival home in Chandler, Arizona built in 1938. The house is a part of the Chandler Museum.

== History ==
It was built as a winter residence for William D. McCullough of Detroit in 1938, but it was acquired by Arthur and Louise Price in 1950. (Louise Price was the niece of Dr. A. J. Chandler, who founded the city named after him.) In 2001, their daughter, Suzanne Price Propstra, donated the home to the city. By this time, it had been vacant and had become run down. Meanwhile, around the pueblo, major development was occurring, as Chandler Fashion Center was under construction (to open in October 2002). The city began to renovate the property into a state-recognized visitors center which opened in 2007 after $850,000 had been spent on improvements. But financial troubles and "fail[ure] to connect with an audience" (according to the city museum administrator Jody Crago) forced its closure in 2009. That same year, it was listed on the National Register of Historic Places.

It reopened in 2011 as an archive research center focusing on local history, office space for museum staffers (moving from the museum in downtown Chandler) and satellite exhibition space.
