= Oshrin Hospital =

Geography
- Location: 2100 East Speedway Blvd. Tucson, Arizona, United States
- Coordinates: 32.235°N 110.940°W

Organization
- Type: Sanitarium

Services
- Beds: 152

History
- Founded: 1922
- Closed: July 1, 1971

Links
- Lists: Hospitals in Arizona

Oshrin Hospital, also known as Oshrin Indian Hospital, Tucson Indian Hospital, and the Barfield Sanatorium, was a sanatorium located in Tucson, Arizona. The hospital was located at 2100 E. Speedway Blvd. The hospital was opened in 1922 and closed in 1971.

== History ==
Prior to opening as a medical facility, the land was owned by V.S Griffith. In 1921, the hospital was originally opened as a convalescent home ran by L. A. Craven. This property was sold to Karl F. Barfield for $2,650 in July 1922.

The hospital shifted operations and opened as the Barfield Sanatorium by Barfield in 1922. In 1928, the hospital expanded to include two more cottages for the price of $16,800. The contract was awarded to W. T. Reed of Tucson. By 1930, the sanatorium could accommodate 35 patients.

In 1946, the Sanatorium was sold by Barfield to Albert S. Oshrin, who renamed it Oshrin Hospital. The hospital was sold for $130,000. At the time of the sale, the hospital had 22 beds and 10 buildings.

By 1952, the hospital expanded to have 50 beds and employed about 45 people. In the same year the hospital was renovated for $25,000, which included a new kitchen. Arthur Thompson was hired as the manager of the sanatorium.

Under the ownership of Oshrin, the hospital shifted to treating Native American patients, mainly of Hopi and Navajo descent. This contract was supported by the Indian Health Service and the United States Public Health Service. This shift was made in response to the large number of Native American patients with tuberculosis needing treatment in the Southwest, particularly from Phoenix and other areas of Tucson. Patients were also transferred to Oshrin from as far away as California, Oklahoma, and Washington. At the time, the death rate for Native Americans with tuberculosis was 10 times higher than the national average. On the Navajo reservation in the 1950s, TB made up 23% of all deaths. There was estimated to be 4,500 Hopi and Navajo members suffering from TB in 1952, though this number is contested due to lack of proper disease tracking. By the 1960s, the ratio of Native Americans with TB was 270 per 100,000 compared to 25 per 100,000 in non-Natives.

In the early morning of May 29, 1954, a 21-year-old patient named Sam Woody assaulted and attempted to rape a 23-year-old patient named Florence Begay. Prior to the assault, nurses at the sanatorium had locked Woody into his cottage after he had attempted to enter the woman's ward. Woody broke free of his confinement by cutting away one of the window screens in his room. Woody then broke into Begay's cottage as she was sleeping and assaulted her with a brick. Begay was in critical condition following the attack, and had to receive 50 stitches to her wounds. Both Begay and Woody were Navajo. Woody spoke little English and had to have an interpreter translate the court proceedings. Woody eventually pled guilty to aggravated battery and was sentenced to 1 to 2 years of prison.

In August 1955, during heavy storms in the area, a palm tree on hospital grounds was struck by lightning twice. Due to the significance of lightning in Navajo culture, many patients wanted to leave the sanatorium. In response, the sanatorium brought in a Navajo medicine man named Mark Belone to perform a ceremonial blessing on hospital grounds. Belone used the hospital intercom to cleanse the grounds and blessed each patient individually. After the ceremony, none of the patients left.

By 1956, the hospital had expanded to accommodate 69 patients and had 75 beds. At the time the hospital had 24 male and 45 female patients. In July of the same year, a $80,000 expansion of the hospital was announced. This expansion aimed to add 32 beds. The expansion was completed in fall, with the hospital expanding to 107 beds. A ceremony blessing the new wards was performed by Tannes Betah and Hosten Nez in October 1956. With the expansion, the hospital also opened admission for any Native American patients, not just individuals from the Hopi and Navajo tribe. Walter T. Altmann was named administrator of the hospital in September of the same year. He remained administrator until the hospital closed in 1971. By 1957, the hospital had 73 patients and 47 employees.

By 1960, patients came from a variety of tribes; the Navajo, Hopi, Tohono Oʼodham, Hualapai, Shoshone, Ute, Apache, Pima, Paiute, Mohave, and Maricopa.

On April 17, 1964, the body of an unidentified man was found burning behind the South Pacific Hospital in downtown Tucson. A paper was found on the body with documentation from Oshrin Hospital and containing the name Raymond Johnson. He stood at about 5'0" and weighed about 120 pounds. He was found wearing green denim pants and dark colored boots. Due to the fire, the medical examiner was unable to determine the race, eye color, and hair color of this man. As of 2025, this man remains unidentified.

In 1965, the hospital began accepting children, with the pediatirics ward opening in May. In the same year, the hospital was accredited by the American Hospital Association. In the same year, Charles D. Grimes was appointed the recreation director for the hospital in March. In 1966, the hospital had 90 patients, 13 of them being children. At this point in time, the hospital had admitted 866 patients in total. By 1968, the patient number had risen to 125. By 1967, the hospital had had 152 beds. In 1970, the hospital had 130 patients from 14 different Indigenous tribes. Approximately 80 of these patients were bed bound.

By early 1970, the hospital began to head towards shutdown. In the late 1960s, the hospital had already begun shifting away from care of TB patients to skilled nursing. On closure, only 18 of the 110 patients were infected with TB. Advancements in medicine had improved the prospects of people infected with TB. Developments such as the BCG vaccine helped prevent the spread of TB. The hospital saw a drop in Navajo patients as more health centers were being built on the reservation. Closure of the hospital was announced in May 1971.

== Closure ==
The hospital closed on July 1, 1971. A total of 100 staff members were laid off. On closure, nine of the most severely ill patients were transferred to the Arizona State Tuberculosis Sanatorium in Tempe. A majority of other patients were sent to nursing homes. The hospital was the last privately contracted sanatorium dedicated to the care of Native Americans left in the United States.

After the closure, Albert Oshrin petitioned the Tucson Planning and Zone Commission to demolish the hospital and rezone the land for real estate developments. Initial plans was for the land to be occupied by a 17-story office building and a 200-room motel. The office buildings were intended to be occupied by medical professionals from the University of Arizona College of Medicine. The cost of this development was estimated to be $10 million. After his initial plans were rejected, Oshrin downgraded his development to an eight-story apartment building and offices. This plan was rejected in 1973 after heavy neighborhood pushback.

After closure, the property saw a number of tenants. Initially, the hospital was converted to apartments aimed towards students at the University of Arizona. In early 1973, a New Age church utilized the property for lectures and classes. In 1974, the property was used as a Montessori school named Apple Castle Children's Center. In the same year the Church of Scientology set up their Tucson headquarters on the property.

In 1976, the United States Postal Service bought the property. In 1977, several former hospital buildings were demolished to build a new post office, which was opened on May 22, 1978. This post office replaced two older locations, the University Station and the Speedway Station. The building remains a USPS location to this day named the Sun Station.

Albert Oshrin died of cardiovascular issues at the Tucson Medical Center on June 30, 1979, at the age of 64. Walter T. Altmann, hospital administrator from 1959 to 1971, died on August 1, 2001. Libby McNeill, the hospital's occupational therapist from 1956 to 1971, died on December 23, 1996.

== Patient life ==
The average stay for each patient was about 18 months to two years, with some patients staying as long as four years. The hospital took in patients of various ages, originally just adults before shifting to admitting children by the mid-1960s. Visitors were permitted at the hospital, though no one below the age of 16 was allowed in to prevent the spread of TB.

Patients under 18 were kept away from adult patients, as some of them had a more severe version of tuberculosis called primary tuberculosis. Kindergarten, elementary school and high school education was conducted on hospital grounds in a school room at the hospital. K-18 education was oversaw by the Tucson Public School system and the Bureau of Indian Affairs.

Many younger patients could speak English, but some older patients were unable to. It's estimated that about 25% of patients could not speak English by the mid-1960s. Staff resorted to interpreters and sign language to communicate with non-English speaking patients.

In 1956, a project was started to exchange Polaroid photos and tape recordings of patients with loved ones living elsewhere in the state. The idea for this project was proposed by Albert Oshrin. While similar programs had been successfully used in California, this program was the first of its kind in Arizona. This project was enacted as many older patients could not read or write and therefore had trouble keeping in touch with family and friends. It also aimed to curb homesickness and prevent patients from leaving before their treatment was completed. The project was headed by Kenneth Hale with assistance from his wife Sara.

Each patient room had a TV and a radio. The hospital featured a recreation room, which featured designs and art work from each tribe that had members there. It also had a small garden on the grounds that was tended to by patients. Some recreational events included bingo, movie nights, and barbeques.

The hospital offered occupational therapy programs such as painting, woodworking, mosaic making, silversmithing, bead work, rug weaving, basket weaving, linen making, leather crafting, and doll making. About half the patients were able enough to participate in occupational therapy programs. Patient work was sold, with part of the money going back to the patients and the other part going to fund the hospital. Any item sold was sterilized by ultraviolet light to limit the spread of TB. Each activity within the occupational therapy program was designed to be performed in bed and to have limited strain on each patient. Patient work was also frequently shown and sold at art competitions and fundraisers. In 1956, the occupational therapy program was headed by Libby McNeill, who remained at the hospital until its closing in 1971. By the 1960s, the hospital had expanded its programs to offer recreational programs, health and academic education, and vocational rehabilitation, and job training in addition to occupational therapy. Before discharge, patient were referred to the Arizona State Department of Vocational Rehabilitation for testing and further vocational training.

The hospital published a monthly newspaper for patients. The first iteration was called the Oshrin Talking Thunderbird Newsletter, while the second iteration was called Smoke Signals. Smoke Signals was published until the hospital closed in 1971. In 1961, the editor of the paper was Eugene Johnson.

The hospital had a chapel where various religious rites were held. Church servies were offered weekly to Mormon, Catholic, Lutheran, and Protestant faiths. The hospital offered a chaplain.

Patient's diet was tailored to each patients medical needs and individual preferences. Fish was served to Catholic patients who were not permitted to eat meat on Fridays. In the late 1950s, the weeks menu was chosen at random by a visitor to the hospital. Cultural dietary preferences of patients from different tribes were taken into account.
