= List of hospitals in Arizona =

This is a list of hospitals in Arizona (U.S. state). There are hospitals in all but one county of Arizona. The largest number of hospitals are in the Phoenix metropolitan area.

== Hospitals ==
The American Hospital Directory lists 145 hospitals in Arizona, which had a population of 7,151,502 in 2020. In 2020, these hospitals had 13,296 staffed beds. The largest hospital, based on beds, is the Banner University Medical Center in Phoenix, with 712 beds. There is a hospital run by the Mayo Clinic in Phoenix. The Arizona Department of Health maintains a list of trauma centers in Arizona.

=== Phoenix metropolitan area ===
There are 66 hospitals in the Phoenix metropolitan area.

Hospitals in the Phoenix metropolitan area
Name	Type	Trauma center	City	County	Beds	Opened–closed	Coordinates	References
Abrazo Arizona Heart Hospital	Cardiology		Phoenix	Maricopa	59	1998	33.48127°N 112.04012°W	
Abrazo Arrowhead Campus			Glendale	Maricopa	262	1988	33.65481°N 112.20112°W	
Abrazo Central Campus (formerly Phoenix Baptist Hospital)			Phoenix	Maricopa	216	1963	33.52510°N 112.10227°W	
Abrazo Scottsdale Campus (formerly Paradise Valley Hospital)			Phoenix	Maricopa	120	1983	33.63936°N 111.99841°W	
Abrazo West Campus (formerly West Valley Hospital)		Level I	Goodyear	Maricopa	179	2003	33.46188°N 112.35290°W	
Arizona State Hospital	Psychiatric hospital		Phoenix	Maricopa	159	1887	33.45532°N 112.02866°W	
Aurora East Hospital	Psychiatric hospital		Tempe	Maricopa	138		33.36450°N 111.93948°W	
Aurora West Hospital	Psychiatric hospital		Glendale	Maricopa	100		33.58088°N 112.18934°W	
Arizona Spine and Joint Hospital			Mesa	Maricopa	23	2002	33.38046°N 111.73470°W	
Avenir Behavioral Health Center at Surprise	Psychiatric hospital		Surprise	Maricopa	32		33.63444°N 112.38114°W	
Banner Baywood Medical Center		Level III	Mesa	Maricopa	340	1984	33.41129°N 111.68900°W	
Banner Behavioral Health Hospital	Psychiatric hospital		Scottsdale	Maricopa	124		33.48302°N 111.91867°W	
Banner Boswell Medical Center (formerly Boswell Memorial Hospital)		Level IV	Sun City	Maricopa	525	1970	33.60309°N 112.28325°W	
Banner Cardon Children's Medical Center (formerly Cardon Children’s Medical Center)	Children's Hospital		Mesa	Maricopa		2009	33.39023°N 111.87811°W	
Banner Casa Grande Medical Center (formerly Casa Grande Regional Medical Center)		Level IV	Casa Grande	Pinal	141	1984	32.88134°N 111.70994°W	
Banner Del E Webb Medical Center		Level III	Sun City West	Maricopa	404	1988	33.65971°N 112.37295°W	
Banner Desert Medical Center (originally Desert Samaritan, aka "Desert Sam")		Level I	Mesa	Maricopa	615		33.38992°N 111.87726°W	
Banner Estrella Medical Center		Level IV	Phoenix	Maricopa	317	2005	33.47820°N 112.25743°W	
Banner Gateway Medical Center			Gilbert	Maricopa	286	2007	33.38442°N 111.72296°W	
Banner Goldfield Medical Center			Apache Junction	Maricopa	20	June 14, 2013	33.39441°N 111.56717°W	
Banner Heart Hospital	Cardiology		Mesa	Maricopa	108	November 2000	33.41128°N 111.68582°W	
Banner Ironwood Medical Center		Level IV	Queen Creek	Maricopa	86	November 1, 2010	33.21481°N 111.56499°W	
Banner MD Anderson Cancer Center	Oncology		Gilbert	Maricopa	177	September 26, 2011	33.38439°N 111.72638°W	
Banner Ocotillo Medical Center			Chandler	Maricopa	124	November 2, 2020	33.28516°N 111.85736°W	
Banner Rehabilitation Hospital West	Rehabilitation Hospital		Peoria	Maricopa	56		33.59950°N 112.26164°W	
Banner Thunderbird Medical Center (originally Thunderbird Samaritan Medical Center)		Level I	Glendale	Maricopa	595	1983	33.60935°N 112.18003°W	
Banner – University Medical Center Phoenix (formerly Good Samaritan Medical Center)		Level I	Phoenix	Maricopa	720	1911	33.46467°N 112.05856°W	
Barrow Neurological Institute	Neurological		Phoenix	Maricopa	144	1961	33.48194°N 112.07886°W	
City of Hope, Phoenix (formerly Cancer Treatment Centers of America)			Goodyear	Maricopa	38			
ClearSky Rehabilitation Hospital of Avondale	Rehabilitation Hospital		Avondale	Maricopa		2022	33.46325°N 112.29468°W	
Copper Springs Hospital	Psychiatric hospital		Avondale	Maricopa	144		33.46538°N 112.28774°W	
Copper Springs East Hospital	Psychiatric hospital		Gilbert	Maricopa	72	August 24, 2020	33.28211°N 111.75001°W	
Chandler Regional Medical Center			Chandler	Maricopa	429	1961	33.29680°N 111.87424°W	
Cobalt Rehabilitation (TBI) Hospital	Rehabilitation Hospital		Surprise	Maricopa	40	2015	33.63934°N 112.34129°W	
Dignity Health Arizona General Hospital			Phoenix (Laveen)	Maricopa	16		33.38069°N 112.16700°W	
Dignity Health Arizona Specialty Hospital			Chandler	Maricopa			33.33398°N 111.89124°W	
Dignity Health East Valley Rehabilitation Hospital	Rehabilitation Hospital		Chandler	Maricopa	50	October 18, 2016	33.31616°N 111.74409°W	
Dignity Health East Valley Rehabilitation Hospital - Gilbert	Rehabilitation Hospital		Gilbert	Maricopa		2022	33.31613°N 111.74407°W	
Dignity Health St. Joseph's Hospital and Medical Center		Level I	Phoenix	Maricopa	595	1895	33.48203°N 112.07993°W	
Dignity Health St. Joseph's Westgate Medical Center		Level IV	Glendale	Maricopa	24	May 14, 2014	33.54194°N 112.27493°W	
Dignity Health Mercy Gilbert Medical Center			Gilbert	Maricopa	197		33.28710°N 111.75195°W	
Encompass Health Rehabilitation Hospital of East Valley	Rehabilitation Hospital		Mesa	Maricopa	70		33.38017°N 111.70985°W	
Encompass Health Rehabilitation Hospital of Scottsdale	Rehabilitation Hospital		Scottsdale	Maricopa	60		33.58329°N 111.87286°W	
Encompass Health Valley of the Sun Rehabilitation Hospital	Rehabilitation Hospital		Glendale	Maricopa	75		33.60767°N 112.20378°W	
HonorHealth Deer Valley Medical Center (formerly John C Lincoln Deer Valley Hospital)		Level I	Phoenix	Maricopa	204		33.66628°N 112.11589°W	
HonorHealth John C. Lincoln Medical Center		Level I	Phoenix	Maricopa	239	1965	33.56944°N 112.07061°W	
HonorHealth Rehabilitation Hospital	Rehabilitation Hospital		Scottsdale	Maricopa	50		33.56100°N 111.89037°W	
HonorHealth Scottsdale Osborn Medical Center (formerly Scottsdale Healthcare Osborn)		Level I	Scottsdale	Maricopa	303	1962	33.48859°N 111.92312°W	
HonorHealth Scottsdale Shea Medical Center (formerly Scottsdale Healthcare Shea)			Scottsdale	Maricopa	427		33.58017°N 111.88499°W	
HonorHealth Scottsdale Thompson Peak Medical Center (formerly Scottsdale Healthcare Thompson Peak)			Scottsdale	Maricopa	120		33.67079°N 111.92202°W	
HonorHealth Sonoran Crossing Medical Center (formerly John C. Lincoln Sonoran Health)			Phoenix	Maricopa	79	September 2020	33.78548°N 112.13027°W	
Mayo Clinic Arizona (Phoenix)			Phoenix	Maricopa	368	June 1987	33.6585°N 111.9560°W	
Mountain Vista Medical Center		Level III	Mesa	Maricopa	178		33.39139°N 111.61116°W	
Oasis Behavioral Health Hospital	Psychiatric hospital		Chandler	Maricopa	146	2014	33.33999°N 111.84749°W	
Phoenix Children's Hospital	Children's Hospital	Level I Pediatric Trauma	Phoenix	Maricopa	433	1983	33.47895°N 112.04104°W	
Phoenix Indian Medical Center			Phoenix	Maricopa	133		33.49694°N 112.04892°W	
Phoenix Memorial Hospital			Phoenix	Maricopa		1934	33.43556°N 112.08123°W	
Quail Run Behavioral Health	Psychiatric hospital		Phoenix	Maricopa	116		33.67756°N 112.11385°W	
Reunion Rehabilitation Hospital Peoria	Rehabilitation Hospital		Peoria	Maricopa	40	April 4, 2023	33.60689°N 112.26180°W	
Reunion Rehabilitation Hospital Phoenix	Rehabilitation Hospital		Phoenix	Maricopa	48		33.45422°N 112.04623°W	
St. Luke's Behavioral Health Center (Hospital closed Nov. 2019, except Behavioral Health)	Psychiatric hospital		Phoenix	Maricopa	127		33.45328°N 112.04270°W	
Tempe St. Luke's Hospital			Tempe	Maricopa	86		33.41253°N 111.94110°W	
United States Air Force Luke Air Force Base 56th Medical Group Clinic			Luke Air Force Base	Maricopa	0			
Valleywise Behavioral Health Center Maryvale (formerly Abrazo Maryvale Campus, Maryvale Hospital Medical Center, closed on Dec. 18, 2017)	Psychiatric hospital		Phoenix	Maricopa	192	1961–2017	33.50279°N 112.17042°W	
Valley Hospital	Psychiatric hospital		Phoenix	Maricopa	122		33.48284°N 112.00565°W	
Valleywise Health Medical Center		Level I	Phoenix	Maricopa	645		33.45729°N 112.02677°W	
Veterans Health Administration Carl T. Hayden Medical Center Phoenix	Veteran Hospital		Phoenix	Maricopa		1987	33.49676°N 112.06690°W	

=== Hospitals outside of Phoenix ===
There are 44 other hospitals outside of the Phoenix metropolitan region. Greenlee County does not have a hospital.

Hospitals outside of Phoenix
Name	Type	City	County
Banner Payson Medical Center		Payson	Gila
Banner – University Medical Center South		Tucson	Pima
Banner – University Medical Center Tucson		Tucson	Pima
Benson Hospital		Benson	Cochise
Bullhead Community Hospital		Bullhead City	Mohave
Carondelet St. Joseph's Hospital		Tucson	Pima
Cobre Valley Regional Medical Center		Globe	Gila
Copper Queen Community Hospital		Bisbee	Cochise
Diamond Children's Medical Center	Children's Hospital	Tucson	Pima
Flagstaff Medical Center		Flagstaff	Coconino
Florence Community Healthcare		Florence	Pinal
Havasu Regional Medical Center		Lake Havasu City	Mohave
HealthSouth Rehabilitation Hospital of Southern Arizona	Rehabilitation Hospital	Tucson	Pima
Holy Cross Hospital		Nogales	Santa Cruz
Hopi Health Care Center		Polacca	Navajo
Hu Hu Kam Memorial Hospital		Sacaton	Pinal
Kingman Regional Medical Center		Kingman	Mohave
La Paz Regional Hospital		Parker	La Paz
Little Colorado Medical Center (formerly Winslow Memorial Hospital)		Winslow	Navajo
Mount Graham Regional Medical Center (MGRMC)		Safford	Graham
Northern Cochise Community Hospital		Willcox	Cochise
Northwest Medical Center		Tucson	Pima
Oro Valley Hospital		Tucson	Pima
Page Hospital		Page	Coconino
Prescott VA Medical Center		Prescott	Yavapai
Sage Memorial Hospital		Gando	Apache
San Carlos Apache Tribe Healthcare Corporation		Peridot	Gila, Graham
Sierra Tucson		Tucson	Pima
Sierra Vista Regional Health Center		Sierra Vista	Cochise
Southeast Arizona Medical Center		Douglas	Cochise
Southeastern Arizona Behavioral Health Services		Nogales	Santa Cruz
St. Mary's Hospital		Tucson	Pima
Summit Healthcare Regional Medical Center		Show Low	Navajo
Tsehootsooi Medical Center (formerly Fort Defiance Indian Hospital)		Fort Defiance	Apache
Tuba City Regional Health Care Corporation		Tuba City	Coconino
Tucson Heart Hospital	Cardiology	Tucson	Pima
Tucson Medical Center		Tucson	Pima
Tucson VA Medical Center		Tucson	Pima
Verde Valley Medical Center		Cottonwood	Yavapai
Western Arizona Regional Medical Center		Bullhead City	Mohave
White Mountain Regional Medical Center		Springville	Apache
Wickenburg Regional Hospital		Wickenburg	Maricopa
Winslow Indian Healthcare Center		Winslow	Navajo
Yavapai Regional Medical Center		Prescott	Yavapai
Yuma Regional Medical Center		Yuma	Yuma

=== Tribally operated 638 health clinics ===
Tribally operated 638 health clinics include the following:

638 designated health clinics in Arizona
Name	City
Ak-Chin Health Clinic	Maricopa
Clarence Wesley Health Center	Peridot
Dilkon Health Clinic	Dilkon
Fort Mojave Indian Health Center	Mohave Valley
Gila Crossing Health Clinic	Laveen
Leupp Health Clinic	Leupp
LeChee Health Center	Page
Nahata Dziil Health Center	Sanders
Sacred Peaks Health Center	Flagstaff
Wassaja Memorial Health Center	Fountain Hills

== Former hospitals ==
Hospital	County	City	Bed count	Trauma center	Founded	Closed	Notes
Anson's Rest Home	Pima County	Tucson, Arizona					
Carter’s Hotel Rest Sanatorium (also known as Smith Sanatorium)	Pima County	Tucson, Arizona	50		1912	1925	
Comstock Children's Hospital	Pima County	Tucson, Arizona				1966	
Fairview Sanatorium	Pima County	Tucson, Arizona	30		1926	1942	
Hillcrest Sanatorium	Pima County	Tucson, Arizona					
Old Pueblo Sanatorium	Pima County	Tucson, Arizona			November 1929		
Oshrin Hospital (formally Barfield Sanatorium)	Pima County	Tucson, Arizona	125		1922	July 1, 1971	
Reardon Sanatorium	Pima County	Tucson, Arizona			1930		
St.Luke’s In The Desert	Pima County	Tucson, Arizona			1917		
Southern Methodist Hospital (formally Whitwell Hospital and the Tucson Arizona Sanatorium)	Pima County	Tucson, Arizona	83		1906	1938	
