= Banner Desert Medical Center =

- Banner Health

Geography
- Location: 1400 South Dobson Road, Mesa, Arizona, United States
- Coordinates: 33.3908865°N 111.877183°W

Organization
- Type: Teaching

Services
- Emergency department: Level I trauma center
- Beds: 615

Helipads
- Helipad: FAA LID: 66AZ
Number	Length		Surface
Number	ft	m	Surface
H1	40 x 40	12 × 12	concrete
H2	40 x 50	12 × 15	asphalt-concrete

History
- Former names: Mesa Southside District Hospital; Desert Samaritan Medical Center
- Opened: 1973 (53 years ago) in Mesa, Arizona, United States

Links
- Website: www.bannerhealth.com/locations/mesa/banner-desert-medical-center
- Lists: Hospitals in Arizona

Banner Desert Medical Center, formerly Desert Samaritan Medical Center, or “Desert Sam," is a 615-bed non-profit, short-term acute care hospital located in Mesa, Arizona (southeast suburban Phoenix) adjacent to the border with Tempe, providing tertiary care and healthcare services to the East Valley portion of the greater Phoenix area (along with its sister facilities, Banner Baywood Medical Center/Banner Heart Hospital, located on the east side of Mesa, and Banner Gateway Medical Center in Gilbert). It is designated by the Arizona Department of Health Services (ADHS) as a Level I trauma center. It is part of the locally based, regional Banner Health system of non-profit hospitals and clinics.

== History ==
In 1910, Mesa was the “small town Americana” trading center of a vast rural area east of Phoenix. Its residents had to travel into Phoenix for any serious medical care. One of the field surgeons for the construction site of Roosevelt Dam, sensing an opportunity, rented out a private residence in what is now downtown Mesa and opened a hospital. At least one other private clinic was operated in Mesa during this period.

In the aftermath of World War I, cotton was one of the “5 C’s” anchoring the young state's agriculturally-based economy, and that of Mesa in particular. The relatively high cotton futures prices provided a financial foundation for a new and expanded hospital. The homestead of the LeSueur family, one of the pioneer Mormon families of Mesa, and located at Main Street and Hibbert, was purchased for a site on which to build a facility. Temporary hospital operations were established in the LeSueur residence, a two-story structure which looked like a mix of Queen Anne and prairie architectural styles. $150,000 in loans were secured, but by the time construction was ready to begin in 1919, cotton prices severely plummeted and the hospital organizers could no longer afford the loan payments. The city of Mesa bought the LeSueur property at auction and leased it to the hospital's board. The Woman's Club of Mesa and the city together paid off the balance due on the property. In 1923, the facility was reorganized as the Southside District Hospital, with new trustees and a new charter.

The LeSueur home was demolished in 1934 with a new hospital wing built on the site as a WPA project and opened in 1935. Another wing was constructed in 1942 as a wartime project necessitated by the opening of Williams Air Force Base (now Phoenix-Mesa Gateway Airport).

In the years after World War II, the Phoenix area, including Mesa, experienced dramatic growth, with the cotton fields giving way to suburban residential subdivisions as well as retail, manufacturing and warehouse facilities. In December 1958, a new three-story, $700,000 north wing was dedicated for Southside District Hospital (the building was later converted into a Maricopa County service facility and eventually renovated for use by Benedictine University for their downtown Mesa campus).

Despite this, as the 1960s progressed and the area continued its dramatic growth and expansion, the need for expanded medical facilities in the East Valley was still readily apparent. In the early spring of 1968, officials of Southside and Phoenix-based Good Samaritan Hospital began talks leading up to a merger, the creation of Samaritan Health System, and eventual construction of a new 200-plus-bed flagship hospital facility serving Mesa and Tempe. Samaritan began major planning of this hospital in 1969; the primary architects were the Houston-based firm Caudill Rowlett Scott and Phoenix-based Weaver and Drover (now DWL Architects), who designed the facility in the Brutalist architectural style considered state-of-the art for that era. In April 1973 Southside was officially closed and replaced by the $18 million, 275-bed Desert Samaritan Hospital near Southern Avenue and Dobson Road. The Arizona National Guard assisted with transferring Southside's 40 patients the five-mile distance from the old facility to the new one, as part of a training exercise. The campus was further expanded and altered on the site over the succeeding years, but patients and visitors can still see hints of the original 1973 structure throughout the campus.

Banner Health was created in the fall of 1999 through a merger between Samaritan Health System and North Dakota-based Lutheran Health Systems, which operated a hospital complex in East Mesa, opened in 1983, which would be renamed Banner Baywood and Banner Heart Hospital. (Lutheran also operated a medical center in northwest Mesa which opened in 1964, closed in 2007 and converted into office space for Banner Health.) Desert Samaritan was renamed Banner Desert Medical Center not long thereafter.

Banner Children's at Desert (formerly Cardon Children's Medical Center, so named after a $10 million donation from a prominent local family), a 248-bed pediatric facility on the Banner Desert campus, opened as the most recent standalone expansion of the campus (a seven-story pediatric patient tower) in November 2009 at a cost of $356 million. There is an associated Ronald McDonald House.

In February 2021, a $400 million expansion project was announced, to include adding 24 adult acute care patient beds by summer 2021, and building a new women's tower, adjacent to the pediatric patient tower, to be ready by 2023; an expansion of the intensive care unit (ICU) will be ready by the first quarter of 2024. Part of the $400 million will also go towards doubling the size of Banner Gateway Medical Center in neighboring Gilbert, a sister facility which Banner Health originally opened in 2007, as a response to the closure of the former Mesa Lutheran and the ongoing suburban growth of the East Valley.

== Health services ==
Health services offered at Banner Desert and Banner Children's at Desert include: clinical laboratory, diagnostic imaging, emergency room, inpatient care to support the medical and surgical specialties and programs, lung testing, noninvasive heart tests, maternity care, gynecologic surgery and an Organ transplant center.
