= Alexander J. Chandler =

Arizona pioneer (1859–1950)

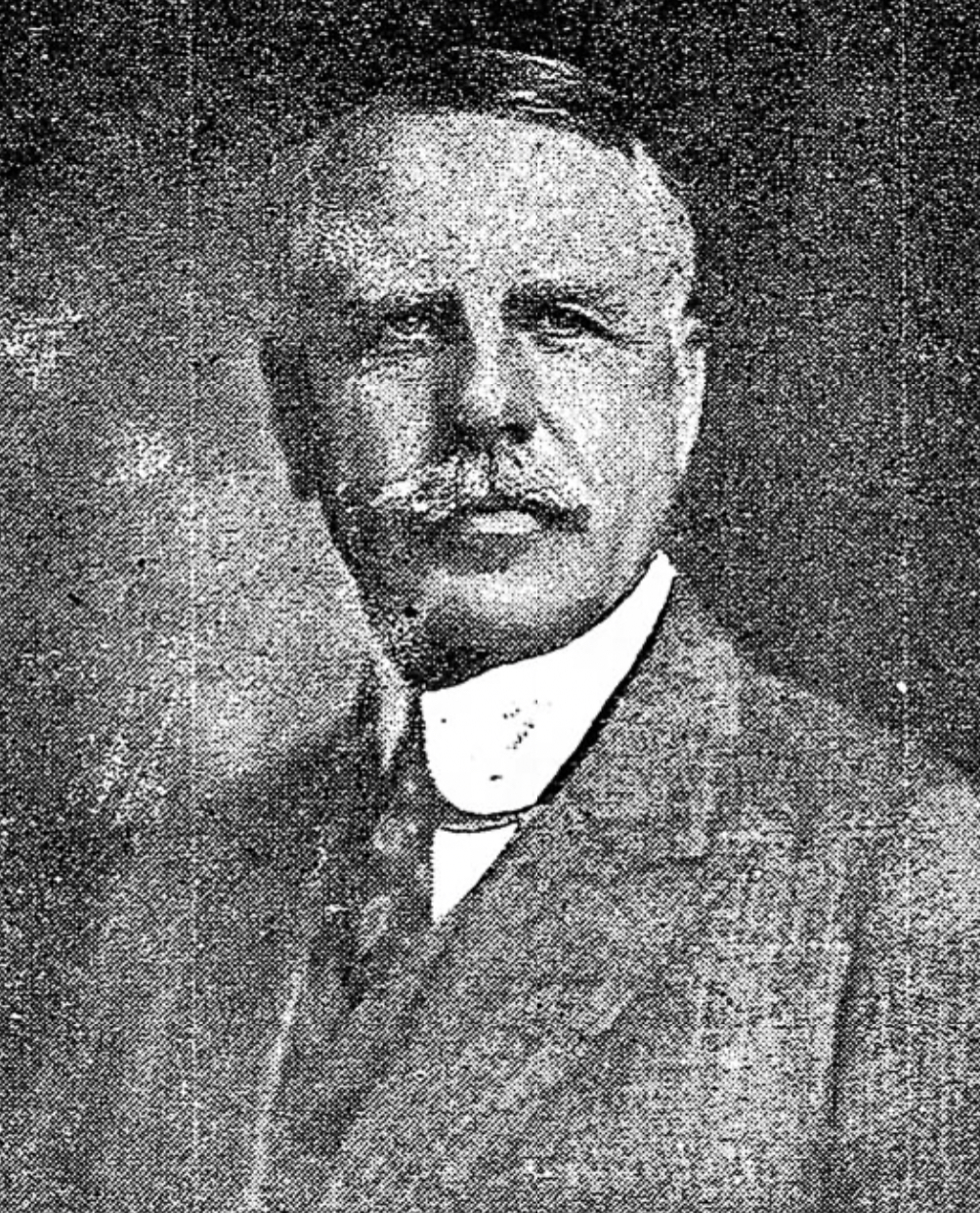
- Alexander J. Chandler in 1920
- Born: July 5, 1859; Coaticook, Quebec, Canada
- Died: May 8, 1950 (aged 90); Chandler, Arizona
- Occupations: Veterinarian; Real Estate Developer; Entrepreneur; Rancher

Alexander J. Chandler (1859–1950) was a Canadian-American who was the first veterinary surgeon in the Arizona territory and the founder of the city of Chandler.

== Early life ==
Alexander John (A.J.) Chandler was born on July 15, 1859, in Coaticook, Quebec, Canada.

Chandler attended and graduated the Montreal Veterinary College. In 1882, he moved to Detroit, Michigan where he worked for the D.W. Ferry Seed Company. In 1887, he moved to Prescott in the Arizona Territory after being hired by the Arizona Livestock Sanitary Board and Governor C. Meyer Zulick to investigate cattle disease threatening the area's cattle. Chandler enacted mandatory checks of all migrating cattle, especially from Texas, at the border but was disturbed at the sight of many emaciated cattle. Thirty days after starting the job, Chandler resigned from his post as the territory's veterinarian. Soon after, he started his own practice and moved south to Phoenix.

== Chandler, Arizona ==
In 1891, Chandler bought eighty acres of land from the federal government located in the Salt River Valley south of Mesa. Chandler studied irrigation engineering which was relatively new at the time. He was instrumental in building an early system of canals in the dry and arid Arizona desert, which proved vital for agriculture in the area. Chandler entered into a contract with the city of Mesa to manage their canal and eventually was able to unite all the canals south of the Salt River, similar to what William John Murphy did with the Arizona Canal.

By 1900, Chandler had acquired and owned an 18,000-acre ranch. The Salt River Project Charter only granted each landowner enough water to irrigate only about 160 acres. As a result of the land water restrictions, Chandler used many dummy land owners that mortgaged their land to him and financial backing of D.W. Ferry to acquire his land.

In 1912, Chandler, with the help of planners and architects, subdivided his ranch and drew up a map for his new townsite. He then advertised nationally the sale of his land in a town named Chandler Ranch. On May 17, 1912, Chandler opened the townsite office and began sell the parcels of his new town. Trains on the newly completed Arizona Eastern Railroad brought three hundred speculators who spent $50,000 for land. These buyers were required to build on their land within one year.

A.J. Chandler envisioned an elegant town square with a landscaped central park that the town's businesses would develop around, with covered walkways in front of the buildings. By 1913 businesses had been built along the west and south side of the park, including the Bank of Chandler and the Eastern Railroad depot. Graded dirt roads encircled the park.

But agriculture was the main economic driver in Chandler's early days with cotton, grains, and alfalfa as primary crops. Farmers also raised cattle, sheep, and ostriches whose feathers were used to adorn popular women's fashions. Cotton became the most common and profitable crop in Chandler, especially during World War I. During the war, the Goodyear Tire Company leased 8,000 acres south of town from the Chandler Improvement Company, a real estate company established by A.J. Chandler, and built the town of Goodyear.

In May 1920, the citizens voted to incorporate and become the Town of Chandler. Chandler agreed to serve as the first mayor until one could be elected. The town elected a mayor and council soon after their incorporation.

During the Great Depression the Bank of Chandler collapsed and Chandler lost his San Marcos Hotel to creditors. Frank Lloyd Wright and Chandler were good friends and had planned about fourteen projects in Chandler but due to the depression, the projects never came to fruition. He soon retired and lived on the grounds of the hotel in a small cottage.

== Other endeavors ==
Alexander Chandler was a prominent rancher and farmer with his land as well. He was known to have ostriches for a time, having created the world's only known "ostrich drive." In 1910, Chandler purchased Pan American Ostrich Company's entire stock of ostriches. He then attempted to drive the ostriches like cattle from the company in Avondale to his land in what is now Chandler, a journey of about 27 miles. He also grew cotton, being the first known grower in the region to grow Egyptian cotton. In 1899, David Fairchild, with the United States Department of Agriculture, sent Chandler several bushels of long-staple cotton seeds from Egypt. That same year he began growing it on his land in Mesa. However, Chandler was unable to find pickers to harvest the cotton and it was plowed under. He also grew long staple cotton, abundant in Arizona for its uses.

A.J. Chandler married three times, but never had any children of his own. He married Julia Pope, Charlotte Boyd, and Rosa Bowling.

== Death and legacy ==
Chandler died on May 8, 1950, in his titular town.

== See also ==
- List of mayors of Chandler
