= Carondelet St. Joseph's Hospital =

- Tenet Healthcare
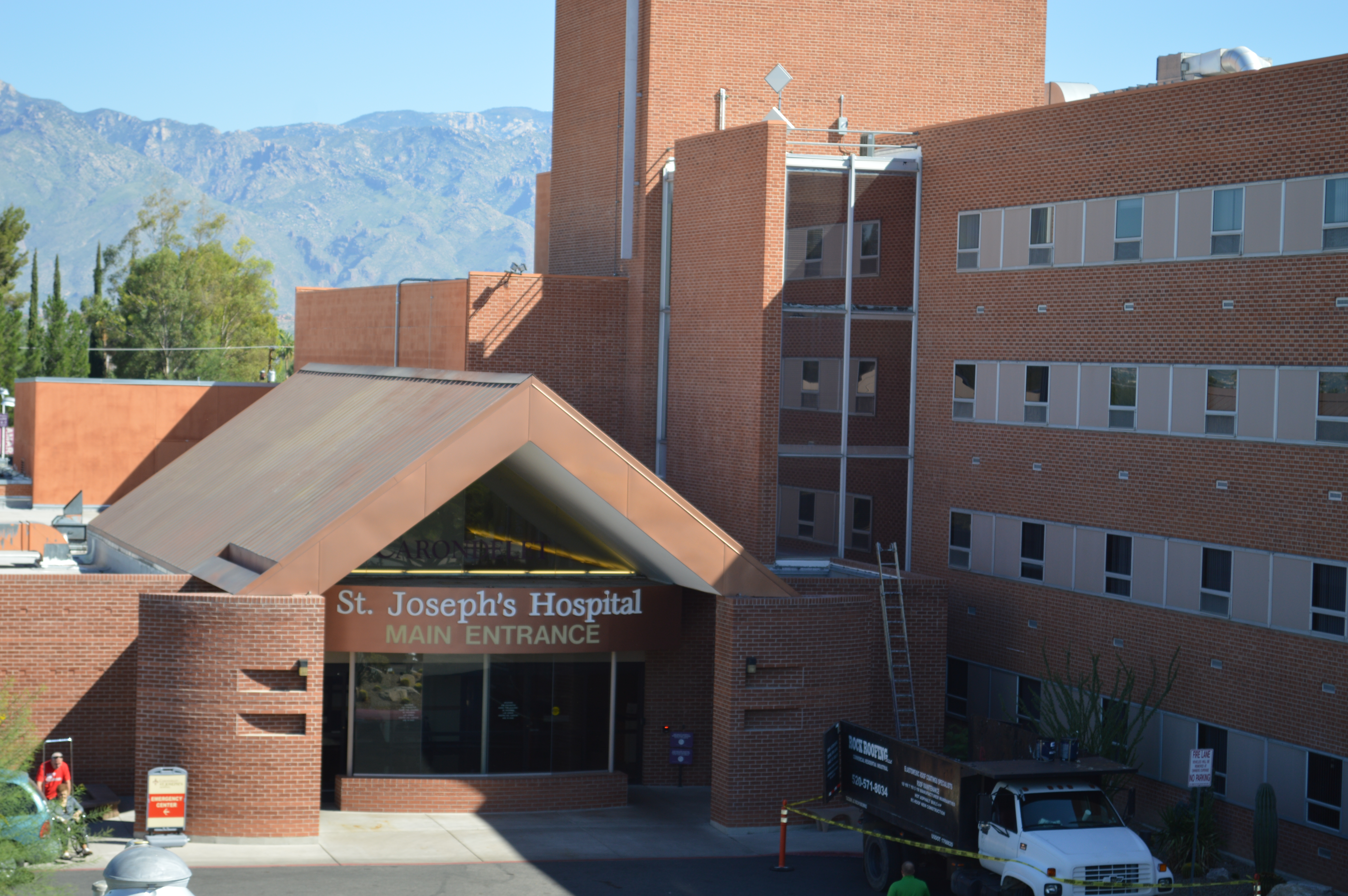
- Carondelet St. Joseph's Hospital's front entrance

Geography
- Location: Tucson, Pima County, Arizona, United States
- Coordinates: 32°13′36″N 110°51′19″W

Organization
- Care system: Tenet Healthcare
- Type: Privately Owned
- Affiliated university: None

Services
- Emergency department: Yes
- Beds: 449

History
- Founded: 1962

Links
- Website: www.carondelet.org
- Lists: Hospitals in Arizona

Carondelet St. Joseph's Hospital, also known as St. Joseph's Hospital and Medical Center, is a private, for-profit, 449-bed acute-care hospital on the east side of Tucson, Arizona. St. Joseph's Hospital is a level 1 trauma center and is part of Carondelet Health Network, owned by Tenet Healthcare, and has sister hospitals in Arizona St. Mary's Hospital in Tucson, Marana Hospital in Marana and Holy Cross Hospital in Nogales.

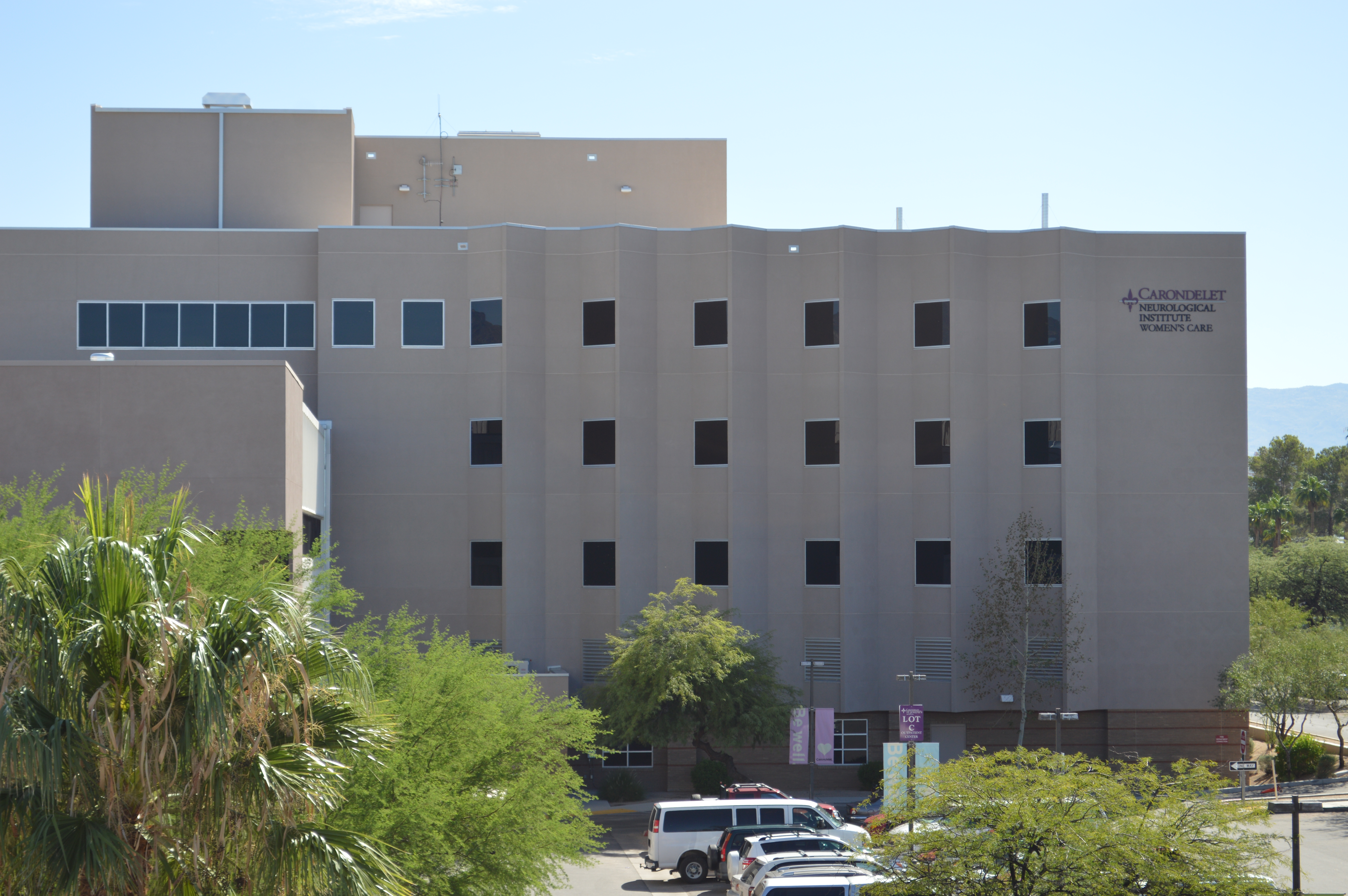
The Carondelet Neurological Institute/Women's Care center, part of the hospital.

The hospital provides services in the following specialties:

- Neurology
- Neurosurgery
- Neuro Endovascular
- Cardiovacular
- Orthopedics
- Level 1 Trauma Care
- Ophthalmology
- Maternity care
- Urology and Gynecology
- Neonatal Intensive Care
- Neuro Critical Care
- Outpatient Rehabilitation
- Robotic Surgery
- Colorectal Surgery

== History ==
St. Joseph's Hospital, 350 N. Wilmot Road, Tucson, was dedicated on May 1, 1961, 81 years to the day that the first patient was admitted to the sister hospital, St. Mary's, on the westside of Tucson.

The $3 million facility was funded in part 8,000 Tucsonans who contributed to a Joint Hospital Drive in 1957.

St. Joseph's Hospital continues to meet the needs of Tucson's growing east side. Originally to be called St. Mary's Hospital East, St. Joseph's Hospital has undergone many transformations. This includes the Regional Eye Center, Women's Pavilion, and North Americas most advanced Neurological Institute.

The Arizona Department of Health Services granted Level I Trauma Center status to Carondelet St. Joseph’s Hospital effective Sept. 20, 2020, which means staff can provide critical care for patients with life-threatening injuries. The hospital began working toward this designation in November 2019 with the opening of new trauma bays — which are specially equipped rooms — as well as a trauma intensive care unit.

St. Joseph's Hospital officially became the second Level 1 trauma center in Tucson, joining Banner UMC. It was also only the 13th hospital in the state to receive this status.

At Carondelet St. Joseph's Hospital, the staff consists of medical specialists and supporting staff who operate in many forms of surgery, including orthopedic trauma surgery, ophthalmology, neurosurgery, cardiovascular/vascular surgery, general surgery, facial surgery, hand surgery, plastic surgery, and other forms of surgery.

== Utilization ==
- 18,474 Discharges
- 81,081 Patient Days
- 4.39 Average Length of Stay in days
- 156,841 Outpatient Visits (Includes emergency visits and outpatient surgeries)
- 77,563 ER Visits
- 5,416 Inpatient Surgeries
- 11,748 Outpatient Surgeries
- 2,909 Newborn Births

== Awards ==
This hospital has been recognized for Patient Safety Excellence Award™ and America’s 50 Best Hospitals for Outpatient Prostate Care Award™.
