= Tuba City Regional Health Care Corporation =

Geography
- Location: 167 Main Street, Tuba City, Arizona, United States
- Coordinates: 36.13611036903724°N 111.23650156624922°W

Organization
- Type: General

Services
- Standards: Joint Commission
- Emergency department: Level III trauma center
- Beds: 76

Helipads
- Helipad: Yes, GPS code: 36.136160,-111.235320
Number	Length		Surface
Number	ft	m	Surface
Helipad 1			concrete/asphalt
Helipad 2			concrete/asphalt

History
- Former names: Indian Health Services, Tuba City
- Opened: 1975

Links
- Website: www.tchealth.org
- Lists: Hospitals in Arizona

Tuba City Regional Health Care Corporation manages a hospital, 12 clinics, and mobile clinics in Tuba City, Arizona. The hospital and clinics serve primarily Native Americans (Navajo, Hopi, and Southern Paiute people) in Arizona. The hospital was part of the Indian Health Service until 2002 when management was shifted to a corporation run by a local board of community members.

== History ==
The hospital was constructed in 1975 as part of the Indian Health Service. There were 75,000 patients in its service area of 6,000 square miles in 2011. The hospital management was transferred to the non-profit Tuba City Health Care Corporation in 2002. As a 638-site, the hospital is operated under the Indian Self-Determination and Education Assistance Act of 1975. In 2010, an ambulatory medical center and outpatient care service were opened on the hospital campus.

Services provided by the hospital include: allergy, audiology, cardiac rehabilitation, CT scan, Dentistry, Dermatology, Diabetes prevention, Ear, nose and throat care, an elderly clinic, Emergency and trauma services, eye clinic, healthy living center, general surgery, infusion and wound center, Intensive care unit, Internal medicine, labor and delivery, OBY/GYN, Meth and suicide prevention, mental health, MRI, mobile health, Native American medicine, Obstetrics, Oral surgery, Orthopedics, Pediatrics care, Pharmacy, Physical therapy, Podiatry, public health nursing, Radiology, respiratory therapy, and a women's clinic.

The corporation employs 1,200 employees and is the largest employer in an eighty-mile radius. The nearest medical facility is in Flagstaff, Arizona. During the 2020 COVID-19 pandemic in the United States, the hospital played significant role in providing treatment for patients in the area. The pediatric ward was converted to COVID-19 patient care and community support was used to make PPE for use in the hospital. Acute shortages in nursing staff during the pandemic were augmented by nursing staff from the University of California and the U.S. Department of Veterans Affairs.
