= Chandler, Arizona =

City in Arizona, United States

- City
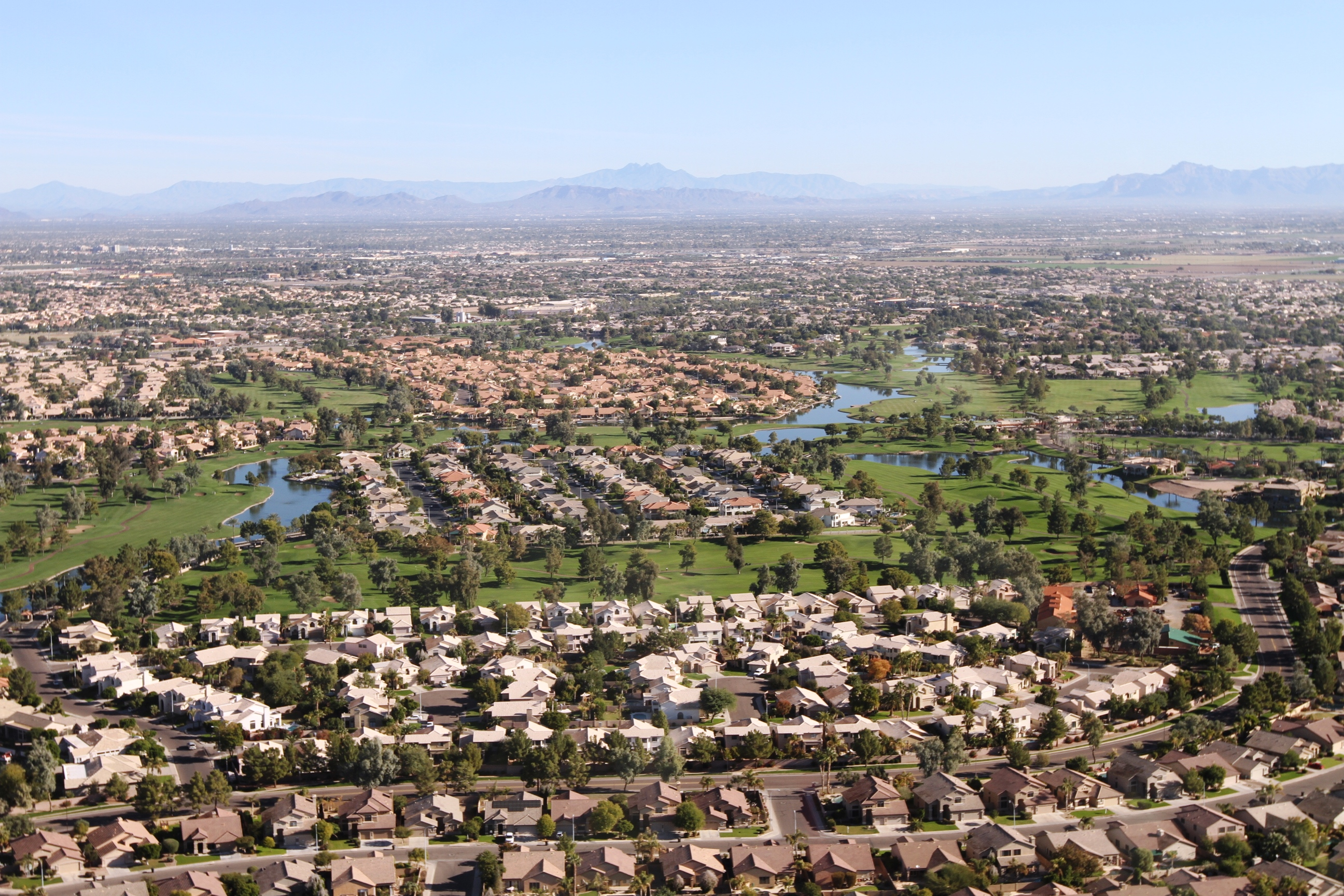
- Aerial view of Chandler

- Flag Seal
- Interactive map of Chandler, Arizona
- Location within Arizona Location within the United States
- Coordinates: 33°18′N 111°50′W
- Country: United States
- State: Arizona
- County: Maricopa
- Founded: May 17, 1912

Government
  - Type: Council-Manager
  - Mayor: Kevin Hartke

Area
  - City: 65.55 sq mi (169.77 km^{2})
  - Land: 65.48 sq mi (169.58 km^{2})
  - Water: 0.069 sq mi (0.18 km^{2})
- Elevation: 1,210 ft (370 m)

Population (2020)
  - City: 275,987
  - Estimate (2025): 278,748 ▲
  - Rank: US: 79th AZ: 4th
  - Density: 4,215.1/sq mi (1,627.45/km^{2})
  - Metro: 4,948,203
  - Demonym: Chandlerite
- Time zone: UTC−7 (MST (no DST))
- ZIP Codes: 85224-85226, 85244, 85246, 85248-85249, 85286
- Area code: 480
- FIPS code: 04-12000
- GNIS feature ID: 2409433
- Website: www.chandleraz.gov

Chandler is a city in Maricopa County, Arizona, United States. It is the fourth-most populous city in Arizona, after Phoenix, Tucson, and Mesa. Chandler is a suburb within the Phoenix metropolitan area and is considered to be a part of the East Valley. As of the 2020 census, its population was 275,987, up from 236,123 at the 2010 census. Chandler is a commercial and tech hub for corporations like Intel, Northrop Grumman, Wells Fargo, PayPal and Boeing.

== History ==
In 1891, Alexander J. Chandler, a Canadian and the first veterinary surgeon in the Arizona Territory, settled on a ranch south of Mesa and studied irrigation engineering. By 1900, he had acquired 18,000 acres (73 km^{2}) of land and began drawing up plans for a town-site on what was then known as the Chandler Ranch. The town-site office opened on May 16, 1912.

The 1912 town-site was bounded by Galveston Street to the north, Frye Road to the south, Hartford Street to the west, and Hamilton Street to the east. By 1913, the town center featured the Hotel San Marcos, which also had the first grass golf course in the state. Chandler High School was established in 1914. Chandler was incorporated on February 16, 1920 by the Maricopa County Board of Supervisors, after 186 residents petitioned them

Most of Chandler's economy was sustained during the Great Depression (though the Depression was to blame for the cancellation of a second San Marcos hotel), but the cotton crash a few years later had a much deeper impact on the city's residents. A. J. Chandler lost his San Marcos hotel to creditors as a result. Later, the founding of Williams Air Force Base in 1941 led to a small surge in population, but Chandler still only held 3,800 people by 1950.

By 1980, the population had grown to 30,000, and it has since paced the Phoenix metropolitan area's high rate of growth, with suburban residential areas and commercial use areas swallowing former agricultural plots. The population has nearly doubled in the last twenty years. Some of this growth was fueled by the establishment of manufacturing plants for communications and computing firms such as Microchip, Motorola and Intel.

== Geography ==
According to the 2020 census, Chandler has a total area of 65.55 square miles (169.8 km^{2}), of which 0.07 square miles (0.18 km^{2}), or 0.11%, are listed as water. The center of the city, along Arizona State Route 87, is 22 miles (35 km) southeast of Downtown Phoenix.

Chandler is in proximity to/borders the San-Tan mountain range. The San-Tan mountains are in the jurisdiction of the Gila River Indian Community.

Chandler is divided into three parts: North Chandler, West Chandler and South Chandler, each being divided by the Loop 202 (Santan Freeway) and Loop 101 (Price Freeway).

=== Climate ===
Chandler has a subtropical hot desert climate (Köppen: BWh) with extremely hot summers and mild winters.

Climate data for Chandler, AZ
Month	Jan	Feb	Mar	Apr	May	Jun	Jul	Aug	Sep	Oct	Nov	Dec	Year
Record high °F (°C)	89 (32)	95 (35)	99 (37)	106 (41)	118 (48)	116 (47)	119 (48)	115 (46)	113 (45)	107 (42)	97 (36)	86 (30)	119 (48)
Mean daily maximum °F (°C)	67 (19)	71 (22)	77 (25)	85 (29)	94 (34)	104 (40)	106 (41)	104 (40)	99 (37)	89 (32)	75 (24)	67 (19)	87 (30)
Daily mean °F (°C)	54 (12)	58 (14)	63 (17)	70 (21)	78 (26)	87 (31)	92 (33)	90 (32)	85 (29)	74 (23)	61 (16)	54 (12)	72 (22)
Mean daily minimum °F (°C)	41 (5)	45 (7)	49 (9)	54 (12)	61 (16)	70 (21)	77 (25)	76 (24)	70 (21)	59 (15)	47 (8)	40 (4)	57 (14)
Record low °F (°C)	15 (−9)	19 (−7)	24 (−4)	30 (−1)	37 (3)	43 (6)	54 (12)	51 (11)	40 (4)	30 (−1)	22 (−6)	17 (−8)	15 (−9)
Average precipitation inches (mm)	1.01 (26)	1.03 (26)	1.19 (30)	0.33 (8.4)	0.17 (4.3)	0.06 (1.5)	0.89 (23)	1.14 (29)	0.89 (23)	0.81 (21)	0.77 (20)	0.98 (25)	9.20 (234)
Source: The Weather Channel

== Demographics ==
Historical population
Census	Pop.	Note	%±
1930	1,378		—
1940	1,239		−10.1%
1950	3,799		206.6%
1960	9,531		150.9%
1970	13,763		44.4%
1980	29,673		115.6%
1990	89,862		202.8%
2000	176,581		96.5%
2010	236,123		33.7%
2020	275,987		16.9%
2025 (est.)	278,748	▲	1.0%
U.S. Decennial Census

=== 2020 census ===
Chandler, Arizona – Racial and ethnic composition Note: the US Census treats Hispanic/Latino as an ethnic category. This table excludes Latinos from the racial categories and assigns them to a separate category. Hispanics/Latinos may be of any race.
Race / Ethnicity (NH = Non-Hispanic)	Pop 2000	Pop 2010	Pop 2020	% 2000	% 2010	% 2020
White alone (NH)	121,168	145,724	147,119	68.62%	61.72%	53.31%
Black or African American alone (NH)	5,821	10,580	15,564	3.30%	4.48%	5.64%
Native American or Alaska Native alone (NH)	1,628	2,715	3,850	0.92%	1.15%	1.39%
Asian alone (NH)	7,345	19,119	32,710	4.16%	8.10%	11.85%
Pacific Islander alone (NH)	222	365	571	0.13%	0.15%	0.21%
Some Other Race alone (NH)	301	369	1,237	0.17%	0.16%	0.45%
Mixed Race or Multi-Racial (NH)	3,037	5,443	12,679	1.72%	2.31%	4.59%
Hispanic or Latino (any race)	37,059	51,808	62,257	20.99%	21.94%	22.56%
Total	176,581	236,123	275,987	100.00%	100.00%	100.00%

As of the 2022 American Community Survey estimates, there were 280,684 people and 106,712 households. The population density was 4,276.2 inhabitants per square mile (1,651.1/km^{2}). There were 113,092 housing units at an average density of 1,722.9 per square mile (665.2/km^{2}). The racial makeup of the city was 56.0% White, 13.4% Asian, 7.6% Black or African American, 4.4% some other race, 1.0% Native American or Alaskan Native, and 0.1% Native Hawaiian or Other Pacific Islander, with 17.5% from two or more races. Hispanics or Latinos of any race were 21.2% of the population. Chandler has the largest percentage of Asians in Arizona.

Of the 106,712 households, 34.4% had children under the age of 18 living with them, 24.2% had seniors 65 years or older living with them, 50.7% were married couples living together, 7.4% were couples cohabitating, 18.3% had a male householder with no partner present, and 23.6% had a female householder with no partner present. The median household size was 2.61 and the median family size was 3.12.

The age distribution was 23.8% under 18, 8.9% from 18 to 24, 27.9% from 25 to 44, 26.4% from 45 to 64, and 13.0% who were 65 or older. The median age was 37.0 years. For every 100 females, there were 105.8 males.

The median income for a household was $98,664, with family households having a median income of $116,362 and non-family households $66,304. The per capita income was $50,247. Out of the 279,322 people with a determined poverty status, 7.6% were below the poverty line. Further, 9.3% of minors and 7.6% of seniors were below the poverty line.

In the survey, residents self-identified with various ethnic ancestries. People of German descent made up 13.0% of the population of the city, followed by Irish at 10.1%, English at 8.5%, American at 5.7%, Italian at 4.5%, Polish at 1.9%, Scottish at 1.7%, French at 1.6%, Arab at 1.5%, Sub-Saharan African at 1.5%, Norwegian at 1.2%, Dutch at 1.1%, Swedish at 1.0%, French Canadian at 0.6%, Russian at 0.6%, Scotch-Irish at 0.5%, and Greek at 0.5%.

== Economy ==
Computer chip manufacturer Intel has two locations in Chandler. Other high-technology manufacturing firms have partnerships with Chandler, their operations employing approximately 25% of non-government workers in 2007.

Since 2003, more than 2,900 jobs and investments totalling $3 billion have been created along the Price and Santan freeways, in the Price Road Corridor. The 1,300,000-square-foot (120,000 m^{2}) Chandler Fashion Center, opened in 2001.

Companies headquartered in Chandler include Keap, Microchip, and Rogers. Bashas' headquarters is in a county island surrounded by Chandler.

=== Top employers ===
According to the City of Chandler Economic Development Division, leading employers in the city are:

#	Employer	# of Employees
1	Intel	12,000
2	Wells Fargo	5,500
3	Chandler Unified School District	4,900
4	Bank of America	3,600
5	Chandler Regional Medical Center / Dignity Health	2,500
6	Northrop Grumman	2,150
7	Chandler–Gilbert Community College	1,900
8	City of Chandler	1,800
9	Microchip Technology (HQ)	1,700
10	NXP Semiconductors	1,700
11	PayPal	1,500
12	Insight Enterprises	1,400
13	Microchip Technology	1,500
14	Verizon	1,400
15	Bashas' (HQ and Distribution Center)	1,100

== Arts and culture ==
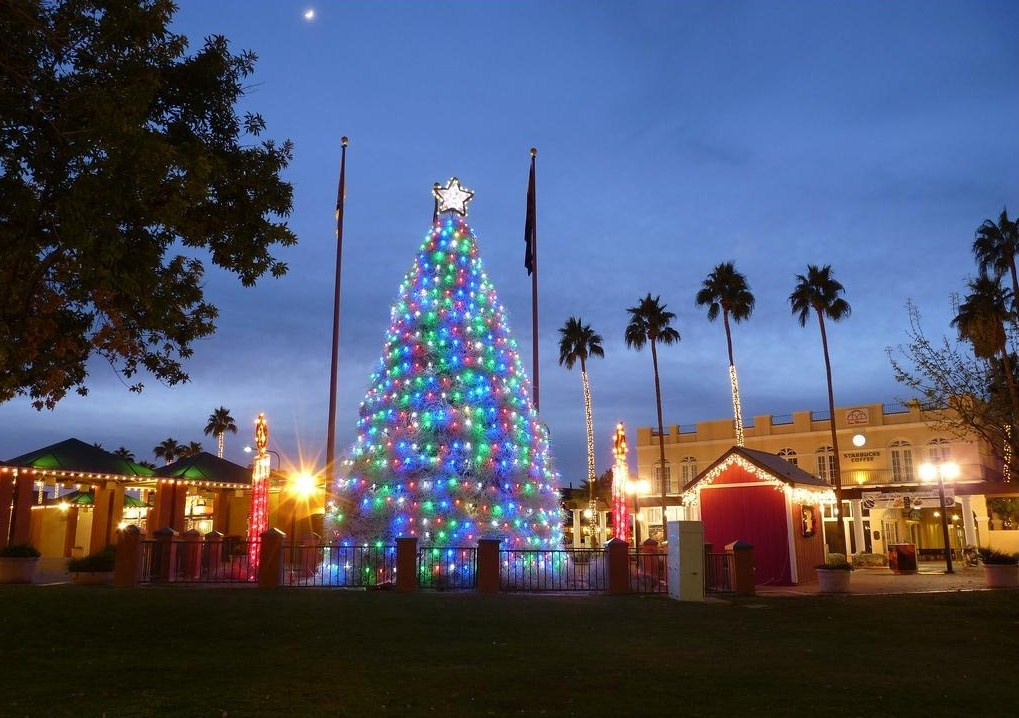
A.J. Chandler Park in downtown Chandler contains a tumbleweed Christmas tree during the holidays.

Chandler holds an annual Ostrich Festival at Tumbleweed Park to commemorate when ostrich farms in the area produced plumes for women's hats during the 1910s.

Chandler also holds an annual ceremony to light a tree made from tumbleweeds; a ceremony founded in 1957 when Chandler sought an alternative way to decorate the city during the Christmas holidays.

Venues, galleries and museums include:

- Chandler Center for the Arts, a 1,500-seat regional performing arts venue, which is shared by the City of Chandler and the Chandler Unified School District.
- The Vision Gallery, a fine arts gallery featuring regional artists.
- The Arizona Railway Museum, located at Tumbleweed Park.
- The Chandler Museum, located near Chandler Fashion Center.

Several sites in Chandler are listed on the National Register of Historic Places, including the McCullough–Price House and the San Marcos Hotel.

The Chandler Public Library serves Chandler and the greater East Valley. The main library is in Downtown Chandler, with three branches elsewhere in the city: Sunset, Basha (shared with Basha High School), and Hamilton (shared with Hamilton High School).

== Parks and recreation ==
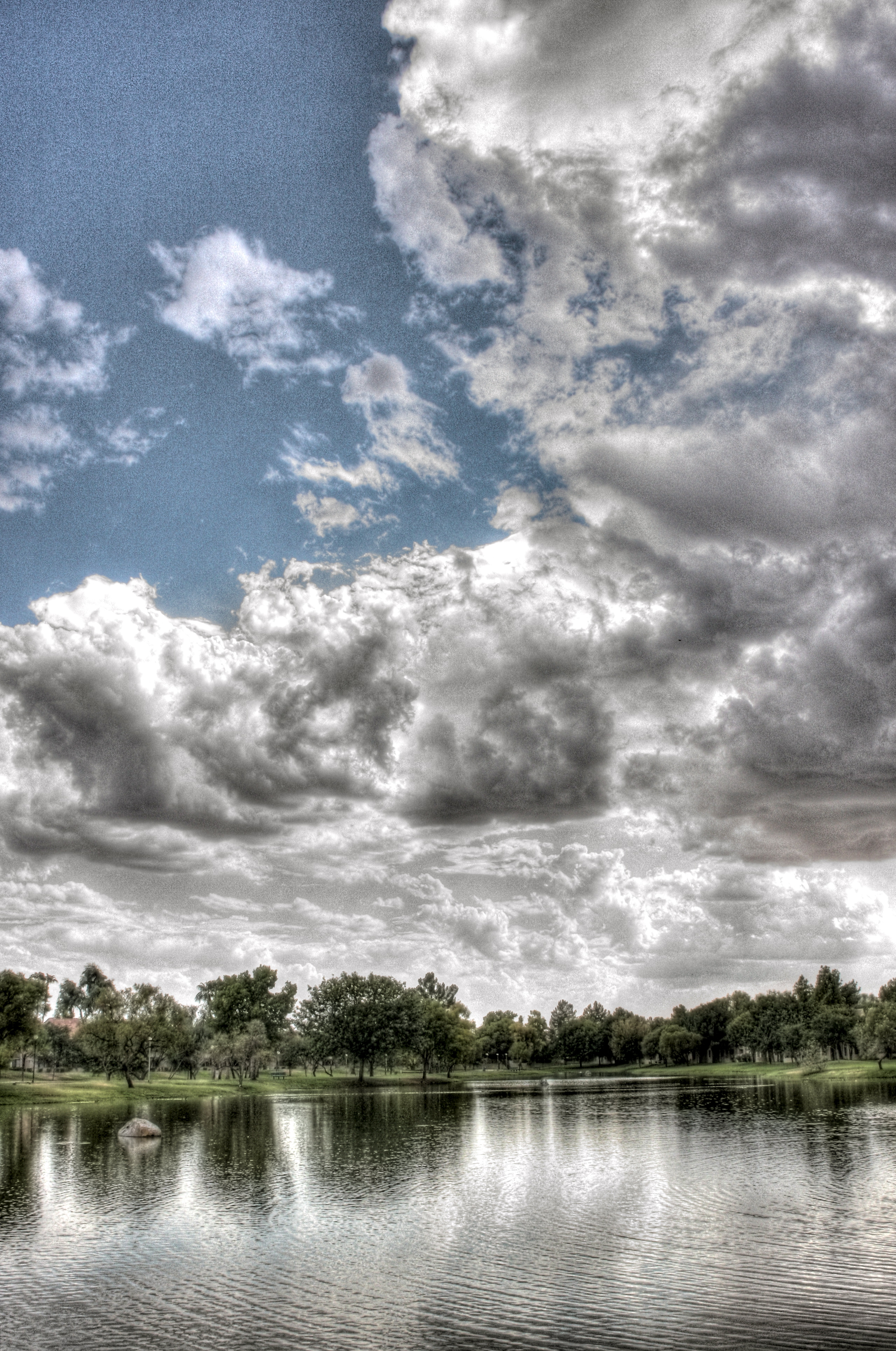
Lake at Village of Gila Springs subdivision, Chandler

Tumbleweed Park hosts the annual Ostrich Festival, the Fourth of July Fireworks Festival and the annual Day of Play. It features a recreational center with equipment suited for fitness.

Hamilton Aquatic Center is a shared-use aquatic facility, located within Hamilton High School's campus.

Nozomi Aquatic Center is a shared-use aquatic facility which includes a 25-yard (23 m), eight-lane competition pool.

Veterans Oasis Park is located at the city's highest point, at 1,311 feet (400 m). It includes a nature center, a fishing lake, wildlife preserve and designated horse and walking trails.

== Government ==
=== City government ===
Chandler is represented by a mayor, a vice mayor and five city council members. The vice mayor is elected by the city council from among its members. The mayor, vice mayor and council members represent the entire city and are not elected from districts or wards.

Kevin Hartke, a Republican, was elected to his second term as mayor in 2023.

=== Federal representation ===
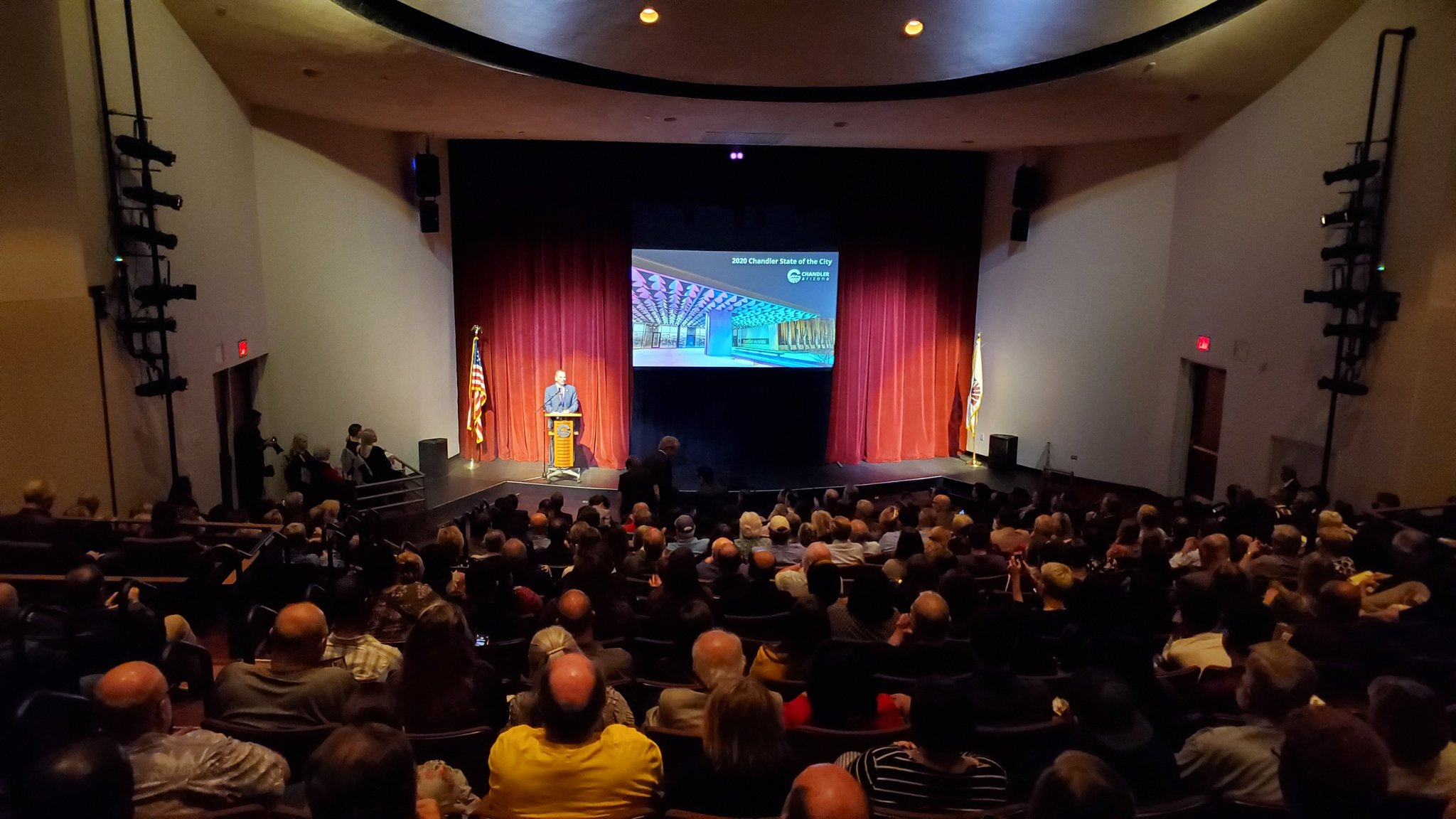
Kevin Hartke presenting the State of the City in 2020

The north central section of the city and the western "leg" of the city are within Arizona's 4th congressional district, served by Representative Greg Stanton, a Democrat. The rest of Chandler is within Arizona's 5th congressional district, served by Representative Andy Biggs, a Republican.

=== State representation ===
Chandler's western "leg" and a small, narrow portion of the adjacent northern part of the city are within Arizona's 18th Legislative District, served by Representatives Denise Epstein and Nancy Gutierrez, and Senator Priya Sundareshan, all Democrats. The rest of the city is in Arizona's 17th Legislative District, served by Representatives Julie Willoughby and Jeff Weninger, and Senator J. D. Mesnard (all Republicans).

== Education ==
=== Elementary and secondary ===
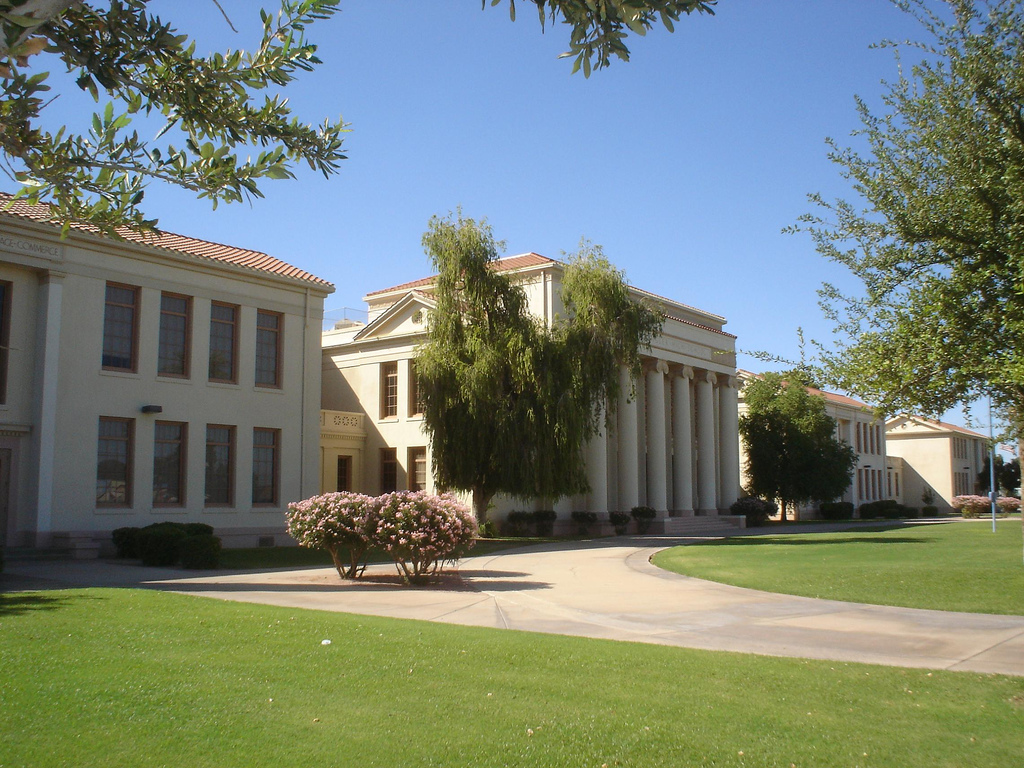
Chandler High School, built 1921

Chandler is served by the Chandler Unified School District, Kyrene School District, Tempe Union High School District, Mesa Public Schools, and Gilbert Public Schools. Catholic and charter schools include Basis Schools and Seton Catholic Preparatory.

=== Post-secondary ===
Post-secondary educational institutions located in Chandler include: The University of Arizona Chandler, International Baptist College, and the two-year Chandler-Gilbert Community College, which serves 13,000 students.

== Infrastructure ==
=== Transportation ===
Chandler Municipal Airport is a two-runway general aviation facility. Stellar Airpark is a privately owned municipal airport open to the public. Chandler is also along two single-track branch lines of the Union Pacific Railroad.

Chandler is served by three limited access highways:

- Loop 202, the Santan Freeway, which divides North and South Chandler.
- Loop 101, the Price Freeway, which was fully completed in 2001.
- Interstate 10, which runs through the city's westernmost border.

=== Arizona Avenue (historic State Route 87) ===
A single-story commercial strip featuring mid-century architectural elements along Arizona Avenue.

Arizona Avenue is a major north–south thoroughfare in Chandler, Arizona, and historically formed part of State Route 87 (SR 87). The roadway passes through the city's historic downtown and serves as a commercial corridor.

During Chandler's early development, Arizona Avenue terminated at the town plaza. By the late 1930s, increasing automobile and truck traffic had created difficulties around the plaza. In 1940, the state proposed routing State Route 87 along Arizona Avenue, dividing the original town plaza to accommodate the highway. The proposal initially faced opposition from residents concerned about the alteration of the town's central park.

Arizona Avenue continues to feature commercial development from different periods of Chandler's growth, including older roadside retail properties, automobile-oriented businesses, and neighborhood shopping centers.

=== Healthcare ===
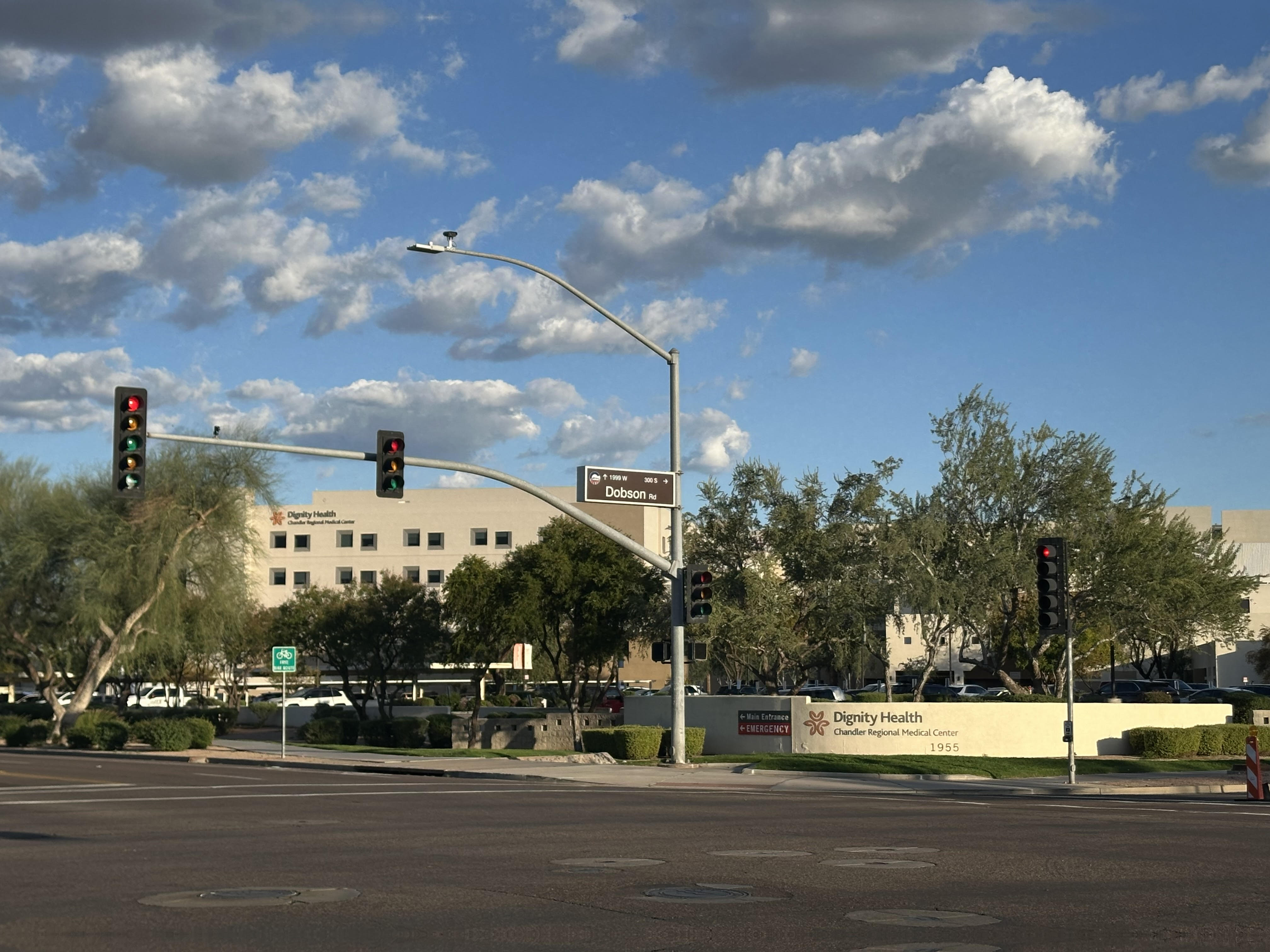
Chandler Regional Medical Center, operated by Dignity Health

Hospitals in Chandler include Chandler Regional Medical Center, and Banner Ocotillo Medical Center. Valleywise Health maintains the Valleywise Health Community Health Center in Chandler.

== Sister cities ==
Chandler has two sister cities:

- (Republic of Ireland) Tullamore, County Offaly, Ireland
- Tainan, Taiwan

== See also ==
- Pueblo de Los Muertos
- Firebird Motorsports Park
