= Woman's Club of Mesa =

Historic women's club in Arizona

- Mesa Woman's Club
- U.S. National Register of Historic Places
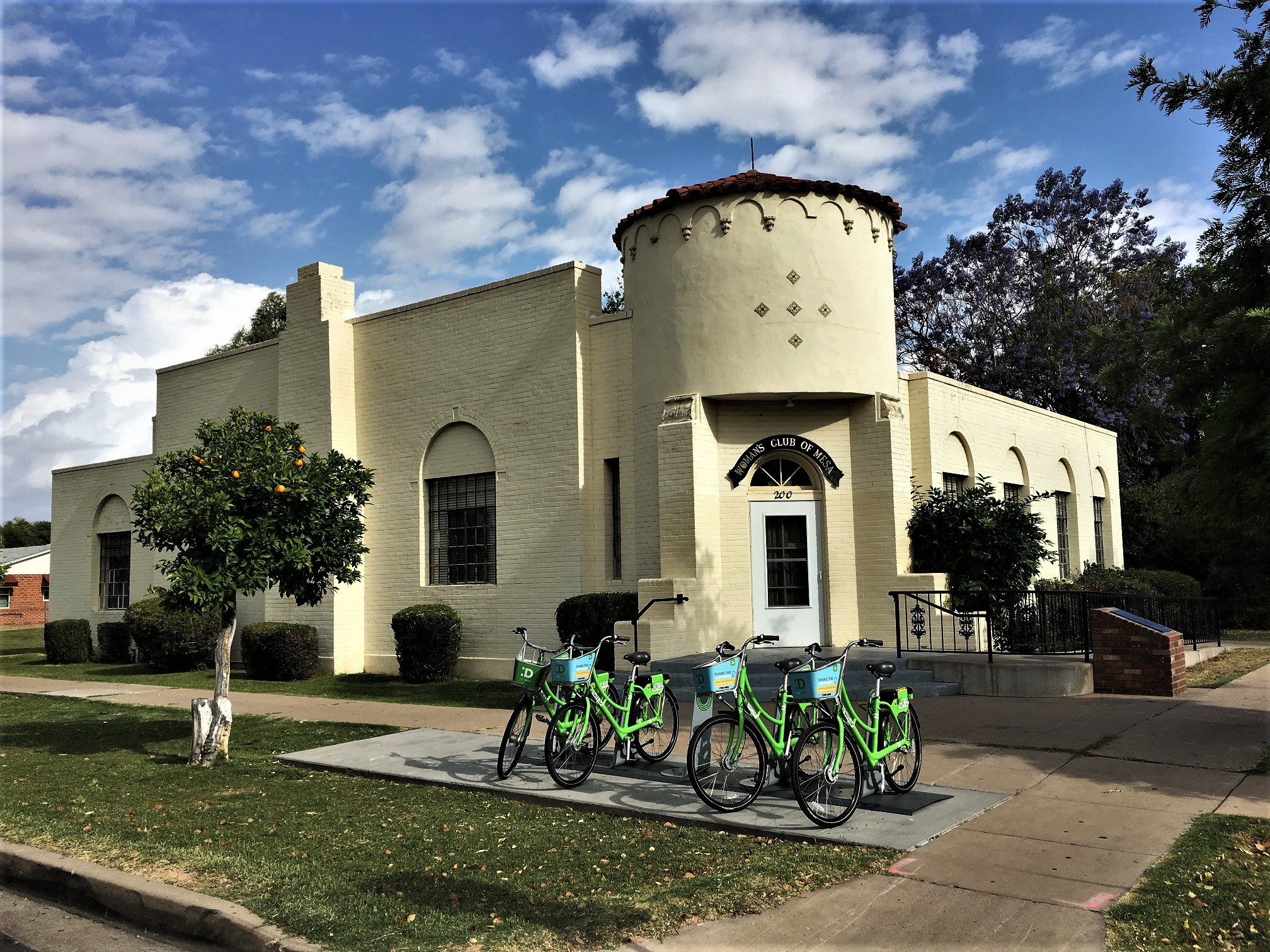
- The front entrance of the clubhouse with turret

- Location within Arizona Location within the United States
- Location: 200 North Macdonald, Mesa, Arizona 85201
- Coordinates: 33°25′11″N 111°50′04″W
- Built: 1931
- Built by: Joseph Nesbitt
- Architect: Henry C. Grote
- Architectural style: Spanish Colonial Revival
- NRHP reference No.: 91000995
- Added to NRHP: August 5, 1991

The Woman's Club of Mesa was a women's club in Mesa, Arizona. Their former clubhouse building is listed on the National Register of Historic Places and is now the Guild of the Vale.

== History ==
The General Federation of Women's Clubs of Arizona was established in 1901 and the Woman's Club of Mesa was founded in 1917 by 53 women. The group focused on social events, educational speakers, funding city parks, giving scholarships to students, and feeding hungry school children.

In 1923 after cotton prices crashed, the club and the city paid off the balance due on the property for Mesa's first hospital, preventing it from closure. Going forward, the club set aside time for "hospital sew days" where members would bring their sewing machines to the clubhouse and sew and create medical supplies.

A number of improvements were made to the clubhouse over the years. In 1931, the junior members raised money for hardwood flooring. In 1937, a swamp cooler was added which was replaced with central air conditioning in 1989. The year before, in 1988, a wheelchair ramp was installed.

In 1990 when the club became inactive, they donated their building to the General Federation of Women's Clubs of Arizona to serve as a headquarters. The building was subsequently sold to the Guild of the Vale, a for profit business running the facility as an event venue.

== Architecture ==
The 1931, Phoenix architect Henry C. Grote designed the clubhouse in a Spanish Colonial Revival style. Joseph Nesbitt, whose wife was a member of the club, was selected as the builder after submitting a very low quote of only $10,580. The one-story building is rectangular except for the kitchen in the rear.

The exterior of the building is painted white brick with a simple cornice detail running along the top of all the facades. Above each window is a Roman arch with articulated impost blocks and plain tympanum panels.

The most prominent architectural feature is a stucco turret with inlaid tiles in a diamond pattern. Under the turret, the main entrance which is surrounded by a corbel arch with brick columns topped with a bracket-like medallions. Above the door is a sign shaped like a banner and a semi-circular fanlight window. The roof of the turret has mission tiles made of terra cotta.

The interior is dominated by a large open hall with a stage but also includes a kitchen, restrooms, storage room, and a backstage area. The walls are lathe and plaster with coved ceilings. Arabesque plaster detailing flank the fireplace, stage, and entry room.

== See also ==
- List of women's clubs
- National Register of Historic Places listings in Maricopa County, Arizona
