= Tucson Medical Center =

Hospital in Tucson, Arizona

Coordinates: 32°15′09″N 110°52′46″W

Tucson Medical Center (TMC)
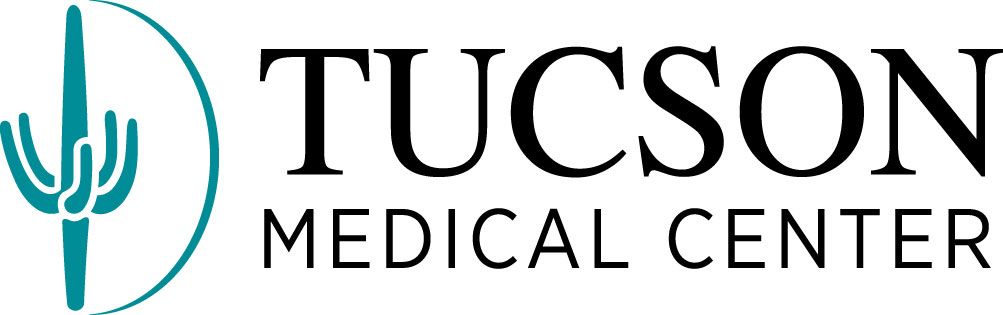
- Type: Non-profit healthcare
- Industry: Healthcare, hospitals
- Founded: 1944
- Headquarters: Tucson, Arizona,
- Key people: Mimi Coomler (President & CEO)
- Services: Primary, secondary, ambulatory clinics
- Website: www.tmcaz.com

Tucson Medical Center (TMC) is a locally governed nonprofit regional hospital in Tucson, Arizona. The medical center is a part of healthcare network TMC Health, the fourth largest healthcare network in Arizona with four affiliated hospitals. TMC is licensed for 568 beds with more than 37,000 annual discharges. Annual revenues are more than $791 million for the city's largest hospital. The medical center is also a member of the Mayo Clinic Network. TMC is consistently ranked a top hospital in Arizona.

== History ==
In the 1920s, the Desert Sanatorium began operating as a tuberculosis treatment center and health retreat at the site that would eventually become Tucson Medical Center. The Sanatorium was primarily frequented by those diagnosed with tuberculosis, and seeking treatment in the dry, warm air of Arizona. Heliotherapy was often used as treatment for these patients. Three of the original buildings can still be found on the medical center's campus today, and have received designations on the National Register of Historic Places. Presently, these buildings primarily serve as administrative office space.

In the summer of 1943, the sanatorium closed after facing numerous hardships — the Great Depression, a loss of clientele, and a shortage of nurses brought on by World War II. The community, recognizing the need for a hospital, organized to raise money to reopen the building as a general hospital. Tucson Medical Center opened on November 9, 1944, admitting its first patient. The center has grown significantly to meet the needs of the surrounding city as it has also seen much population growth.

== Clinical services ==
The midtown facility is licensed by The Joint Commission to provide emergency and inpatient services, TMC for Children, a general pediatric facility located inside TMC, has both pediatric and newborn intensive care, a wellness program and an onsite pediatric emergency department. It does not have psychiatric hospitalization services.

== Outpatient clinics ==
The Joint Commission also licenses the following TMC and TMC Health services:

- TMC Health Cancer Care
- TMC Endocrinology
- TMC Hospice
- TMC Integrative Pain Management
- TMC Infusion Clinic
- TMC Outpatient Therapy
- TMC Pulmonary Associates
- TMC Rheumatology
- TMC Rincon
- TMC Sleep Diagnostics Laboratory
- TMC Women's Imaging Center

== Awards and recognition ==
- U.S. News & World Report routinely ranks TMC as one of the Arizona's top hospitals, and in 2024-2025 ranked Tucson Medical Center No. 5 in Arizona and No. 2 in Tucson. Additionally, it ranked TMC as high performing in AAA repair, heart attack, aortic valve surgery and heart failure; stroke; leukemia and blood cancer; knee and hip replacements; pulmonology/lung surgery and chronic obstructive pulmonary disease.
- TMC is on The American Stroke Association's Target: Stroke Honor Roll Elite for treating 85% or more of eligible stroke patients in 60 minutes or less in addition to meeting current Gold Get With The Guidelines-Stroke status. The hospital is also recognized for having more than 10 years recognition of Gold plus achievement in Get With The Guidelines-Stroke. The ASA also recognizes TMC with the Target: Type 2 Diabetes Honor Roll.
- TMC is certified as a Comprehensive Stroke Center by the Accreditation Commission for Health Care (ACHC), formerly the Healthcare Facilities Accreditation Program (HFAP).
- TMC designated an Accredited Chest Pain Center by the American College of Cardiology.
- TMC is listed by Thomson Reuters as one of the nation's 50 Top Cardiovascular Hospitals for 2011 – the only hospital in Southern Arizona to make the list.
- TMC's electronic medical record is one of the few to reach the top level, Stage 7, on the HIMSS Analytics Database, which tracks hospital EMRs from Stages 0–7.
