= Salt River Valley =

Landform in Arizona

Coordinates: 33.3811546°N 112.3129333°W

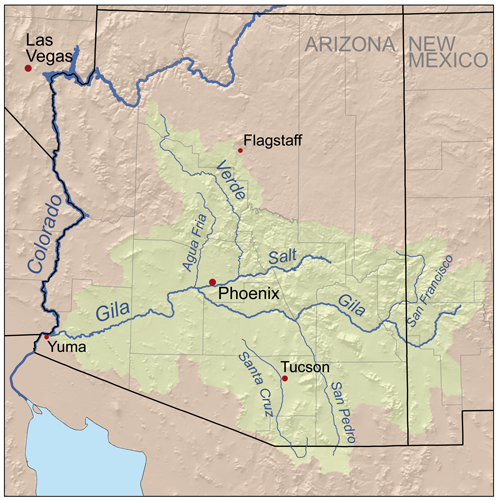
Map of the Gila River watershed.

The Salt River Valley is an extensive valley on the Salt River in central Arizona, which contains the Phoenix Metropolitan Area.

Although this geographic term still identifies the area, the name "Valley of the Sun" popularly replaced the usage starting in the early 1930s for purposes of boosterism.

A common dust for testing air filter efficiency was derived from top soil dust from the Salt River Valley, referred to as Arizona Dust. The dust was found to include small abrasive particles.

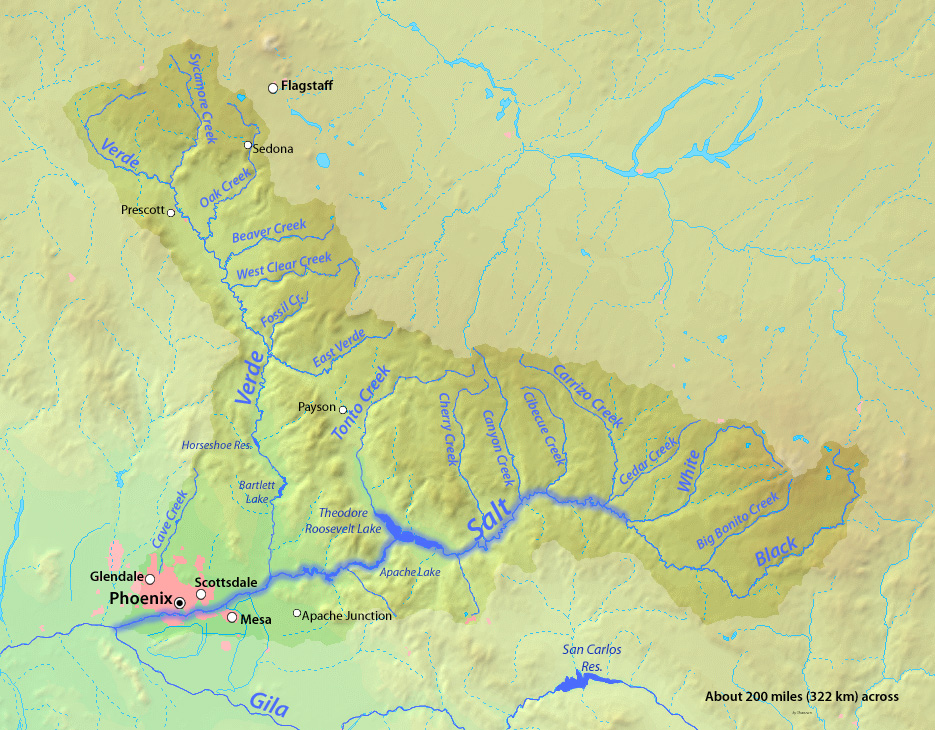
Graphic of the "Salt River Drainage", the Mogollon Rim, and the Arizona transition zone (central-west region)
