= Betty Clements =

American physician (1918–1965)

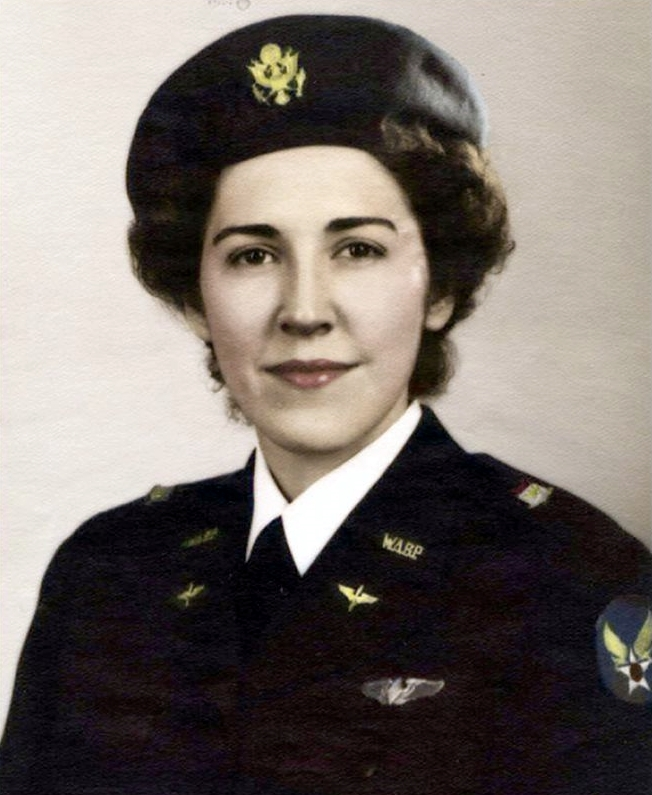
- Clements in uniform, c. 1943
- Born: Grace Elizabeth Clements; April 14, 1918; Elmwood, Nebraska, U.S.
- Died: July 17, 1965 (aged 47); Phoenix, Arizona, U.S.
- Education: University of Nebraska (BS, MD)
- Known for: First woman trainee at the Mayo Clinic to practice neurology; Co-founder Barrow Neurological Institute
- Medical career
- Profession: Physician
- Field: Neurology
- Institutions: Mayo Clinic
- Awards: Congressional Gold Medal (posthumous, 2010)

Grace Elizabeth "Betty" Clements (April 14, 1918 – July 17, 1965) was an American physician, who after serving in the Women Airforce Service Pilots (WASP) during World War II, became the first woman neurology resident at the Mayo Clinic in Rochester, Minnesota, to devote herself to the practice of neurology after residency. She later co-founded the Barrow Neurological Institute.

Clements gained a Regents Scholarship to study education at the University of Nebraska and earned a place on the University's Mortar Board. After graduating in 1939 she was appointed Supervisor of Physical Education for Girls in the McCook Public Schools and at McCook Junior College. She earned her private pilot's license in 1942, following which she was accepted into the WASP program. As a WASP during World War II, she arrived at Utah's Wendover Air Force Base, stepped out of her airplane, and surprised officers greeting her by being a woman. She was part of a team that flew missions associated with the confidential Manhattan Project.

After being honorably discharged from the WASP, she transferred to the American Red Cross training school for hospital workers, and until April 1946 was posted in the Philippines. There, during her spare time she cared for people with leprosy at the Tala Leprosarium, and subsequently organised essential supplies to be transferred there from Nebraska.

She died from cancer in 1965 and in 2010 was posthumously awarded the Congressional Gold Medal.

== Early life and education ==
Grace Elizabeth Clements, commonly known as Betty, was born on April 14, 1918, to Guy L. and Marie Clements in Elmwood, in the midwestern state of Nebraska. Her brothers were Dwight and Gary, and she grew up knowing the children of author Bess Streeter Aldrich. Having achieved the highest average grade in her class following just three years at high school, she gained a Regents Scholarship to study education at the University of Nebraska and earned a place on the University's Mortar Board. After graduating in 1939 she was appointed Supervisor of Physical Education for Girls in the McCook Public Schools and at McCook Junior College.

== World War II ==
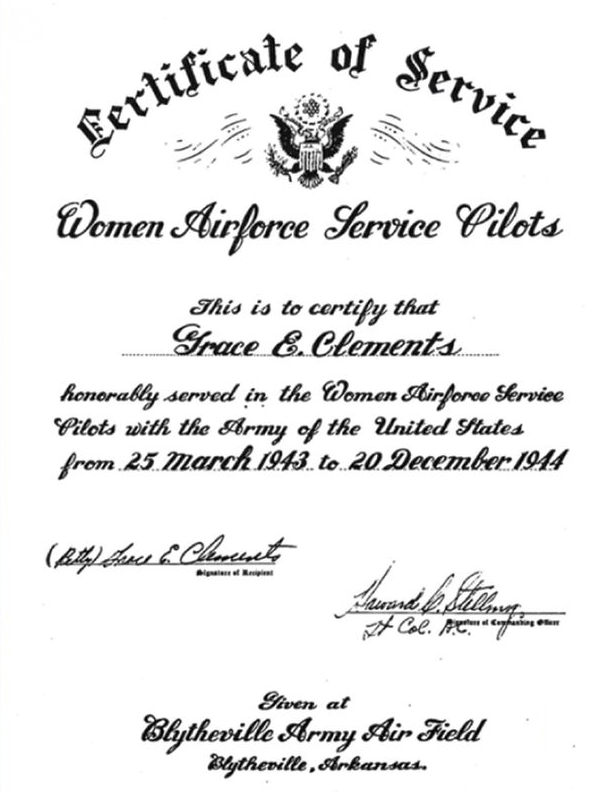
Betty Clements Women Airforce Service Pilots certificate of service

In 1939, with the onset of World War II and whilst still a teacher, Clements commenced flying lessons. In 1941 she moved to Hastings, Nebraska. There, she supervised the Hastings Public School System and taught at Hastings College until 1943, the year following the issue of her private pilot's license. She joined the Army Air Forces Training Command in February 1943. The following month she was accepted into the Women Airforce Service Pilots (WASP) program led by Jacqueline Cochran. Clements described her seven months' training with the WASPs as "usual cadet training except minimum of formation, no gunnery". (Note: Taken from notes at a speech Clements delivered in Rochester in 1954.)

In 1943 she was removed from training for secret missions associated with the Manhattan Project when senior officers realized she was a woman. Her name had been recorded as G. E. Clements, and her profile was found to fit the criteria required by Colonel Paul Tibbets Jr. at Utah's Wendover Air Force Base, for secret missions associated with the Manhattan Project. Unknowing at the time that she was a woman, she was mistakenly selected and surprised the officers who came to greet her at Wendover. Being a WASP, she could not be posted to overseas missions and had to stay on home-ground tasks transferring aircraft from factory to base, towing gunnery targets, and completing engineering flights. During her time at the base, she reported dodging FBI agents, and feeling "frightened to death" to speak of the time even after the war.

Following honorable military discharge from the WASP in December 1944, she transferred to the American Red Cross training school for hospital workers at the American University in Washington, D.C., in March 1945.

== Post–World War II ==
Until April 1946 Clements was posted in the Philippines and worked at a psychiatric hospital and a general hospital. During her spare time she cared for people with leprosy at the Tala Leprosarium. When she returned to the US, she arranged for essential supplies to be sent to the Philippines from Nebraska. Via a friend, Joey Guerrero, food was smuggled to American GIs across Japanese lines.

In 1946, Clements gained admission to study medicine at the University of Nebraska and qualified in 1952, the year after submitting her thesis titled "Recent Trends in Segregation Regulations for Control of Hansen's Disease in the United States". On July 1, 1952, she began her internship at St. Joseph's Hospital, Phoenix, Arizona. A year later she was appointed resident in internal medicine at St. Joseph's, but changed to the specialty of neurology. In October 1954 she gained a fellowship in neurology at the Mayo Graduate School of Medicine, and completed it at the end of 1957, before traveling to England to train for around three months at the National Hospital, London. In her 1956 article "Therapeutic Exercises in Management of Paralysis Agitans" published in The Journal of the American Medical Association, she noted the importance of continuing physical activity and cognitive activities when treating Parkinson disease. Clements became noted for being the first woman neurology resident at Mayo Clinic to devote herself to the practice of neurology after residency.

== Later life ==
In 1958, Clements returned to Phoenix to establish the Barrow Neurological Institute. In addition, she held posts at the Banner Good Samaritan Medical Center, Phoenix Memorial Hospital, Arizona State Hospital, and the Veterans Administration Hospital. She contributed to several societies including the American Academy of Neurology, and the Royal Society of Medicine in London, and she continued to fly. She never married and had no children. In 1960, she was diagnosed with spreading cancer.

== Death and legacy ==
Clements died from cancer on July 17, 1965. In 2010 she was posthumously awarded the Congressional Gold Medal.

== Publications ==
- Clements, B. G. (1957). "Auras of pain and pleasure". Electroencephalogy Clinical Neurophysiol. 9: 571.
- Clark, E. C.; Clements, B. G.; Erickson, D. J.; Maccarty, C. S.; Mulder, D. W. (November 10, 1956). "Therapeutic exercises in management of paralysis agitans". Journal of the American Medical Association. 162 (11): 1041–1043. doi:10.1001/jama.1956.02970280021008. ISSN 0002-9955. PMID 13366704.
