= Phoenix Children's Hospital =

Hospital in Arizona, US, founded 1983

Phoenix Children's
- Children's Healthcare of Arizona, Inc.
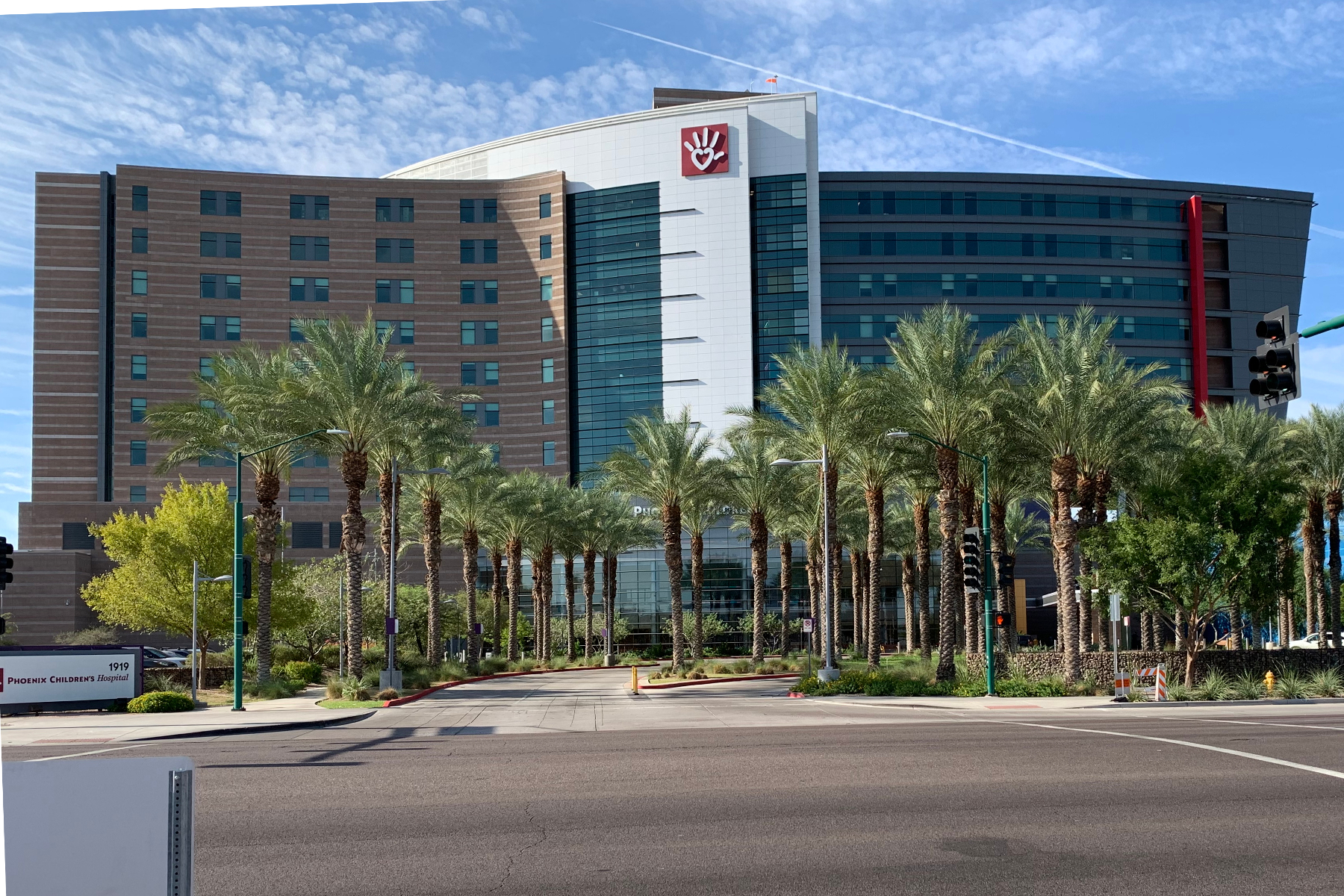
- Exterior view of the main entrance.

Geography
- Location: 1919 E. Thomas Rd., Phoenix, Arizona, United States
- Coordinates: 33.478909°N 112.041576°W

Organization
- Care system: Private
- Type: Specialized
- Affiliated university: University of Arizona College of Medicine – Phoenix

Services
- Emergency department: Level I Regional Pediatric Trauma Center
- Beds: 533 staffed beds

Helipads
- Helipad: FAA LID: AZ99
Number	Length		Surface
Number	ft	m	Surface
H1	46 x 46	14 × 14	aluminum deck
H2	40 x 40	12 × 12	roof

History
- Opened: 1983

Links
- Website: www.phoenixchildrens.org
- Lists: Hospitals in Arizona

Phoenix Children's Hospital is a freestanding pediatric acute care children's hospital located in Phoenix, Arizona. The hospital's main Thomas Campus has 533 pediatric beds and is affiliated with the University of Arizona College of Medicine – Phoenix. Phoenix Children's also partners with Valleywise Health (formerly the Maricopa Integrated Health System) for a 3-year pediatric residency training program. The hospital provides comprehensive pediatric specialties and subspecialties including inpatient, outpatient, emergency, trauma, and urgent care to infants, children, teens, and young adults 0–21 throughout Arizona and the surrounding states. The hospital sometimes also treats older adults that require pediatric care. Phoenix Children's Hospital also features a Level 1 Pediatric Trauma Center, the only in the state.

The hospital is one facility within Phoenix Children's statewide pediatric health system. Additional locations include Phoenix Children's Arrowhead Campus, Phoenix Children's Avondale Campus, Phoenix Children's Hospital–East Valley at Dignity Health Mercy Gilbert Medical Center, four pediatric specialty and urgent care centers, 11 community pediatric practices, 20 outpatient clinics, two ambulatory surgery centers and seven community-service-related outpatient clinics. Phoenix Children's Care Network includes more than 1,175 pediatric primary care providers and specialists who deliver care across more than 75 subspecialties.

== History ==
Phoenix Children's Hospital was founded in July 1980 with the idea to provide pediatric care for the region. The hospital officially opened in 1983 as an independent children's hospital that was physically located within Good Samaritan Hospital. With 124 dedicated pediatric beds, it operated there for nearly 20 years. In September 1985 the hospital performed the first pediatric liver transplant in Arizona. A year later the hospital expanded to take over all of Good Samaritan's pediatric services adding 24 beds with the acquisition, again expanding in 1993 adding another 24 beds for a total of 172 pediatric beds.

In 1999, the hospital purchased a 22-acre plot that was originally occupied by the Phoenix Regional Medical Center for construction of a new freestanding children's hospital. In September 2000, demolition of the old hospital began to make way for the construction on a new freestanding hospital to cope with the large increase in demand for pediatric care.

Phoenix Children's opened as Arizona's only freestanding specialized pediatric hospital in May 2002 with 230 pediatric beds, and the only pediatric emergency department in Arizona.

In spring 2008, the hospital opened a new $23 million Neonatal Intensive Care Unit (NICU), which was one of the largest of its kind in the country.

In 2011, an 11-story tower was opened as the centerpiece of a 37-acre campus including the original East Building, two medical office buildings, a Central Energy Plant, three parking structures, an administration building and a Ronald McDonald House.

In 2016, Phoenix Children's was designated by the Arizona Department of Health Services as the only pediatric Advanced Life Support (ALS) Base Hospital in the state.

In 2017 Phoenix Children's unveiled a new $40 million, 42,300 square foot, 75-room Emergency Department, and nine bay Level 1 Trauma facility to allow more children to be seen more efficiently.

In the spring of 2021, a building collaboration between Dignity Health and Phoenix Children's will be opening on the campus of Mercy Gilbert Medical Center. The new building will be named the Women's and Children's Pavilion and feature a 60-bed Level III NICU, 24 bed pediatric inpatient unit, 24 bed pediatric emergency department, 18 pre-op rooms, 6 operating rooms, and 12 Post-Anesthesia Care Units.

In March 2021, Phoenix Children's announced the building of a freestanding emergency department and specialty clinic in Avondale, Arizona, providing West Valley families convenient access to top-ranked care. The emergency department was opened in July 2023. The campus includes a 71,250-square-foot multi-specialty clinic and an emergency department with 40 triage, treatment, and resuscitation patient rooms.

In May 2021, Phoenix Children's announced the building of an Arrowhead Campus, a freestanding, 3-story hospital in Glendale, Arizona. The Arrowhead Campus opened in August 2024. The campus includes 175,000 square-foot space designed to support inpatient care, an emergency department, an outpatient surgery center, and a multi-specialty clinic with 30 emergency beds, 24 inpatient rooms, and six operating rooms. In July 2025, the campus expanded to 48 inpatient rooms.

In February 2022, Phoenix Children's became a founding partner and official healthcare provider at Bell Bank Park, a $280 million multi-purpose sports and entertainment complex in southeast Mesa, Arizona. Phoenix Children's is opening a 3,915-square-foot facility to offer sports medicine and urgent care at the park.

In May 2024, Phoenix Children's opened a new 44,000-square-foot Level IV NICU, the only one in the state of Arizona. The newly opened 11th floor of the tower adds 48 private NICU beds to the hospital.

== Services ==
In 2013, Modern Healthcare listed Phoenix Children's as one of the largest children's hospitals in the country. Phoenix Children's employs more than 220 pediatric specialists with more than 1,000 pediatric specialists on its Medical Staff and more than 1,000 FTEs on its nursing staff. This represents the largest pediatric group in the state of Arizona. The hospital also works in collaboration with Dignity Health and Mayo Clinic to provide more robust care in specialties related to cardiology, neurology, hematology/oncology and organ transplant.

The hospital has six Centers of Excellence: Barrow Neurological Institute at Phoenix Children's Hospital, Phoenix Children's Heart Center, Center for Pediatric Orthopedics, Center for Cancer and Blood Disorders, Level One Pediatric Trauma Center, and the Neonatal Intensive Care Unit.

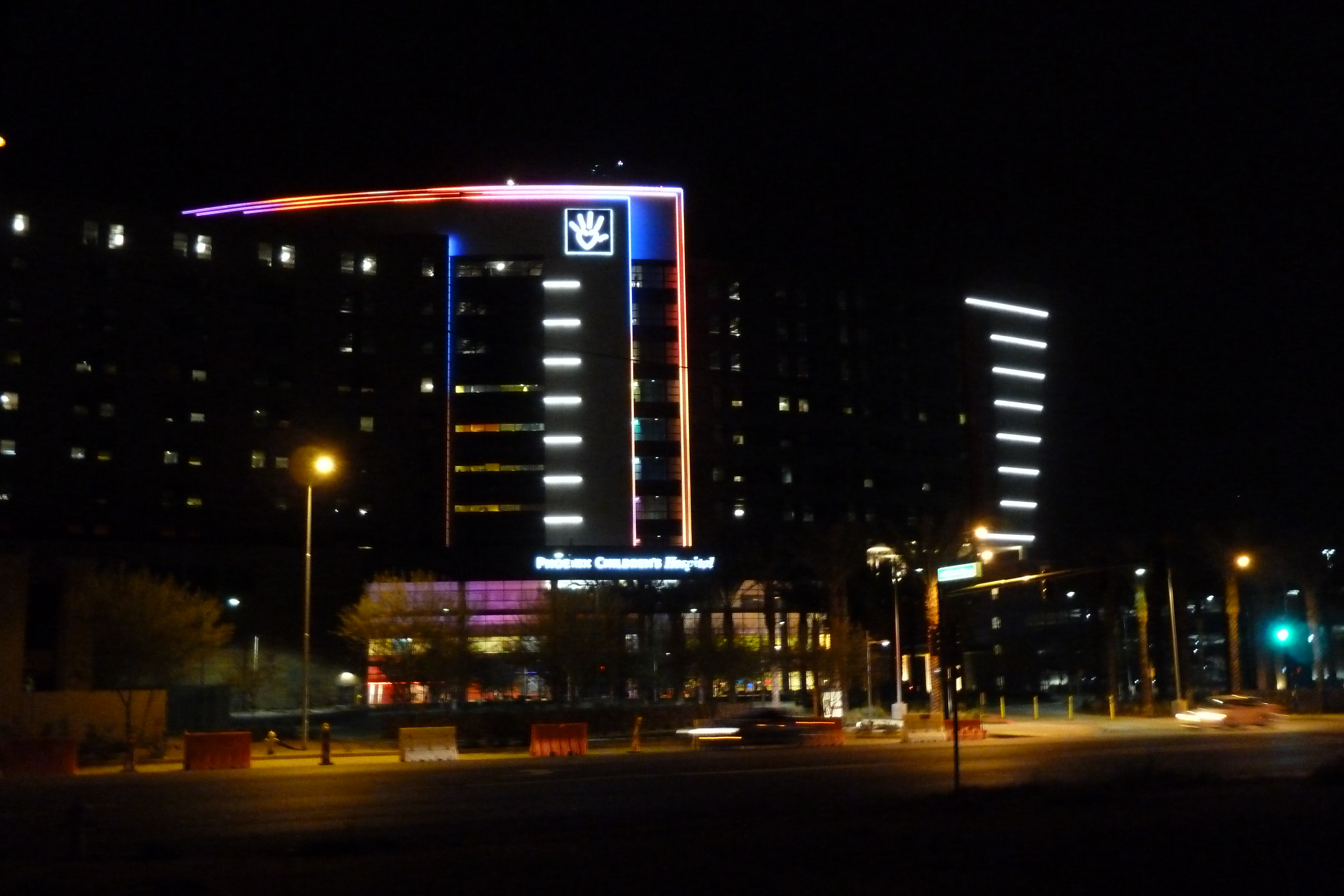
Phoenix Children's Hospital patient tower at night.

=== Barrow Neurological Institute ===
The Barrow Neurological Institute at Phoenix Children's hospital, also called Barrow at Phoenix Children's, is the neurological and neurosurgery Center of Excellence at Phoenix Children's Hospital in Phoenix, Arizona. It is one of six Centers of Excellence at the hospital. The institute is located on the main campus of Phoenix Children's Hospital with satellite clinics across central Arizona.

Barrow at Phoenix Children's offers comprehensive inpatient and outpatient neurological care and services to infants, children, and teens with neurological-related problems. It performs treatment, education, and research and is the largest pediatric neuroscience center in the Southwest. The institute is led by neurosurgeon Jason S Hauptman, MD PhD and neurologist Angus Wilfong MD.

As part of Phoenix Children's Hospital, Barrow at Phoenix Children's is also affiliated with the University of Arizona College of Medicine-Phoenix, providing the pediatric training for medical students there. Phoenix Children's partners with Maricopa Integrated Health System for a combined medical/pediatric residency program.

Each year, Barrow at Phoenix Children's hosts a number of educational conferences and opportunities for medical professionals, including an annual Children's Neuroscience Symposium and weekly Grand Rounds. The Division of Developmental Pediatrics trains physicians to diagnose autism in children through the Early Access to Care – AZ Program, which increases the accessibility of services for children with autism and other developmental disorders.

== Awards ==
Phoenix Children's has been rated by U.S. News & World Report as a Best Children's Hospital for 15 consecutive years as of 2025 and is ranked in 6 specialties listed by the report. It was also named among the Healthiest 100 Workplaces in America by Healthiest Employers every year from 2021 through 2024.

2025-2026 U.S. News & World Report Rankings for Phoenix Children's
Specialty (Pediatric)	Rank (In the U.S.)	Score (Out of 100)
Gastroenterology & GI Surgery	#28	75.7
Neurology & Neurosurgery	#38	75.3
Diabetes & Endocrinology	#47	59.3
Nephrology	#39	74.2
Cardiology & Heart Surgery	#44	71.3
Behavioral Health	Top 50	N/A

Phoenix Children's recently achieved accreditation as an Adult Congenital Heart Disease (ACHD) Comprehensive Care Center from the Adult Congenital Heart Association (ACHA), a nationwide organization dedicated to education, advocacy and research to improve the lives of those born with heart defects.

== Ownership/leadership ==
Children's Healthcare of Arizona, Inc., an Arizona 501(c)(3) non-profit corporation, is the parent holding corporation for the majority voting member interest in Phoenix Children's Hospital. It manages the majority voting member interest in Phoenix Children's Hospital and provides strategic planning, policy and oversight functions.

Phoenix Children's is also an independent, Arizona 501(c)(3) non-profit organization, governed by a community board of directors.

Robert L. Meyer served as president and CEO from 2002 until his retirement in 2025, during much of the hospital system's growth. As of October, 2025, John R. Nickens IV was appointed as president and Chief Executive Officer.

== See also ==
- List of children's hospitals in the United States
