= Arthur Korf =

American soldier (1917–2015)

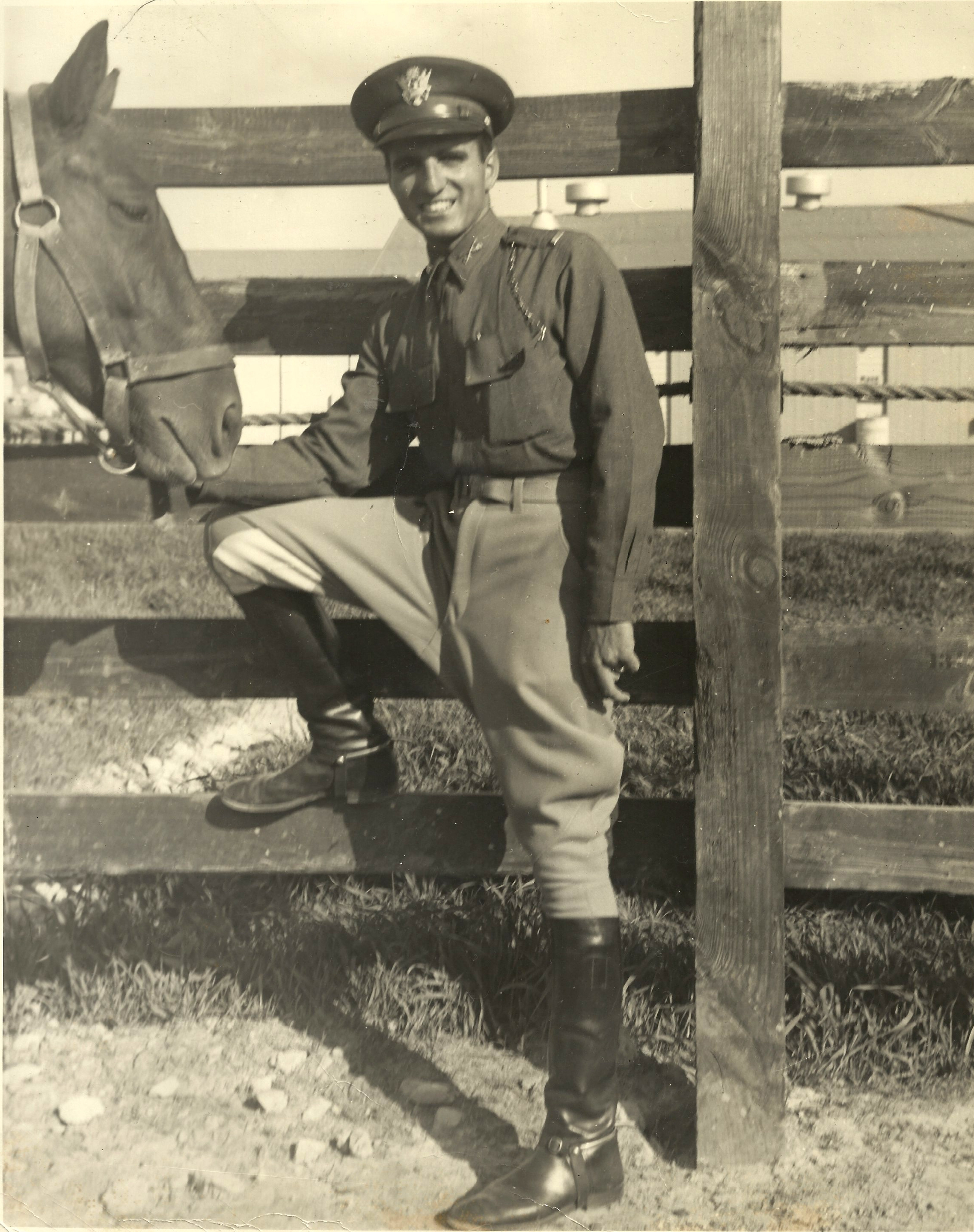
Korf

Arthur Korf (October 8, 1917 – October 22, 2015) was an American soldier. He served in World War II in the United States Army, and went on to become a successful businessman as a franchise owner of McDonald's restaurants. He served during the Battle of the Bulge as a Captain with the 84th Division under Alexander R. Bolling. He was awarded two Bronze Star Medals for his valor in battle. After the war, Korf became a successful businessman as an early franchiser of McDonald's, where he eventually served as Chairman of the Franchisee Advisory Board. Korf was also a philanthropist, serving on the board of directors of the Barrow Neurological Institute and St. Joseph's Hospital and Medical Center in Phoenix, Arizona.

== Early life and education ==
Arthur Korf was born on October 8, 1917, in Kenosha, Wisconsin, the only child of Lithuanian immigrants David and Rose Korf. While growing up in Kenosha, Korf's family helped start the Beth Hillel Temple of Kenosha. Korf also assisted with the family business, a women's clothing store named Korf's Sixth Avenue. At the age of fifteen, he entered the Culver Military Academy and graduated in 1936 as a second lieutenant in the horse cavalry.

== Career ==
After graduation from Culver, Korf briefly enrolled at the University of Wisconsin Madison, but discontinued his studies in 1940 to enlist in the U.S. Army. After completing basic training at Fort Riley, KS, he was selected to attend command and general staff school at Fort Leavenworth, KS. He was eventually promoted to Captain of the 84th Mechanized Reconnaissance Troop and assigned to Special Staff of 84th Infantry as Reconnaissance Troop Commander. The 84th Mechanized was part of the 84th Infantry, known as the Railsplitters.

The 84th Infantry Division embarked for the European theater from Camp Howze, Texas on September 20, 1944. They arrived in England on October 1 for additional training, then landed in Omaha Beach, Normandy, just five months after the famous D-Day invasion. The division entered combat on November 18 with an attack on Geilenkirchen, Germany, (Operation Clipper) as part of the larger offensive in the Roer Valley, north of Aachen. The 84th then turned their focus on Belgium to help stem the German winter offensive otherwise known as the Battle of the Bulge.

Battling in winter snow, sleet, and rain, the division attacked German positions and by mid-January, the 'Bulge' had subsided. The 84th Infantry continued to defeat German troops throughout the spring and crossed the Rhine river on April 1. The Railsplitters drove from Lembeck toward Bielefeld in conjunction with the 5th Armored Division, crossing the Weser River to capture Hanover. It was in Hanover when the 84th liberated two satellite camps of the Neuengamme Concentration Camp: Ahlem (a.k.a. Hannover-Ahlem) and Salzwedel. As such, the 84th is officially recognized as a "Liberating Unit" by both the U.S. Army's Center of Military History and the Holocaust Memorial Museum. The 84th eventually made its way to the Elbe River, making contact with a Soviet armed forces in early May 1945, the first American troops to do so. The division remained on occupation duty in Germany after VE-day, returning to the United States on January 19, 1946, for demobilization.

== Business activities ==
Upon returning home from the war, Korf resumed working for his family's clothing store, helping run the business and expanding it to a store in Waukegan, Illinois. By the end of the 1950s, he began to seek out other business ventures and became acquainted with McDonald's hamburgers. He liked soon decided to become a franchisee of what was at that time a small company.

In 1961, Korf and a partner, Richard Frankel, opened a McDonald's in Spartanburg, SC and then another in Asheville, NC. A few years later, Korf would sell his family's clothing stores in order to open some of the first McDonald's stores in Arizona. Over the next twenty years, Korf would expand his holdings to ten McDonald's restaurants in the greater Phoenix area.

By the 1970s, Korf had become a member of the Board of Directors of McDonald's, serving as Chairman of the Franchisee Advisory Board. During his tenure, he advocated the introduction a breakfast menu to McDonald's restaurants. At that time, such an idea was considered far fetched and risky as no fast food restaurant had tried it. Eventually, it would become an overwhelming success that would redefine the fast food industry.

Korf would eventually sell all of his McDonald's franchises and retire in order to focus on philanthropy and his family.

== Philanthropy ==
Arthur Korf was on the board of directors of the Barrow Neurological Institute for 30 years. He was also on the board of directors of St. Joseph's Hospital and Medical Center in Phoenix for 15 years.

== Personal life ==
Upon returning home from World War II, Korf met Edyth Lees and the two married on Oct. 29, 1947 in Buncombe County, North Carolina. They settled in Kenosha, where they had three children, Karen, Kristina, and David.

On October 22, 2015, Arthur F. Korf died at his residence in Scottsdale, Arizona, at the age of 98.
