= Curtis Dickman =

American Neurosurgeon

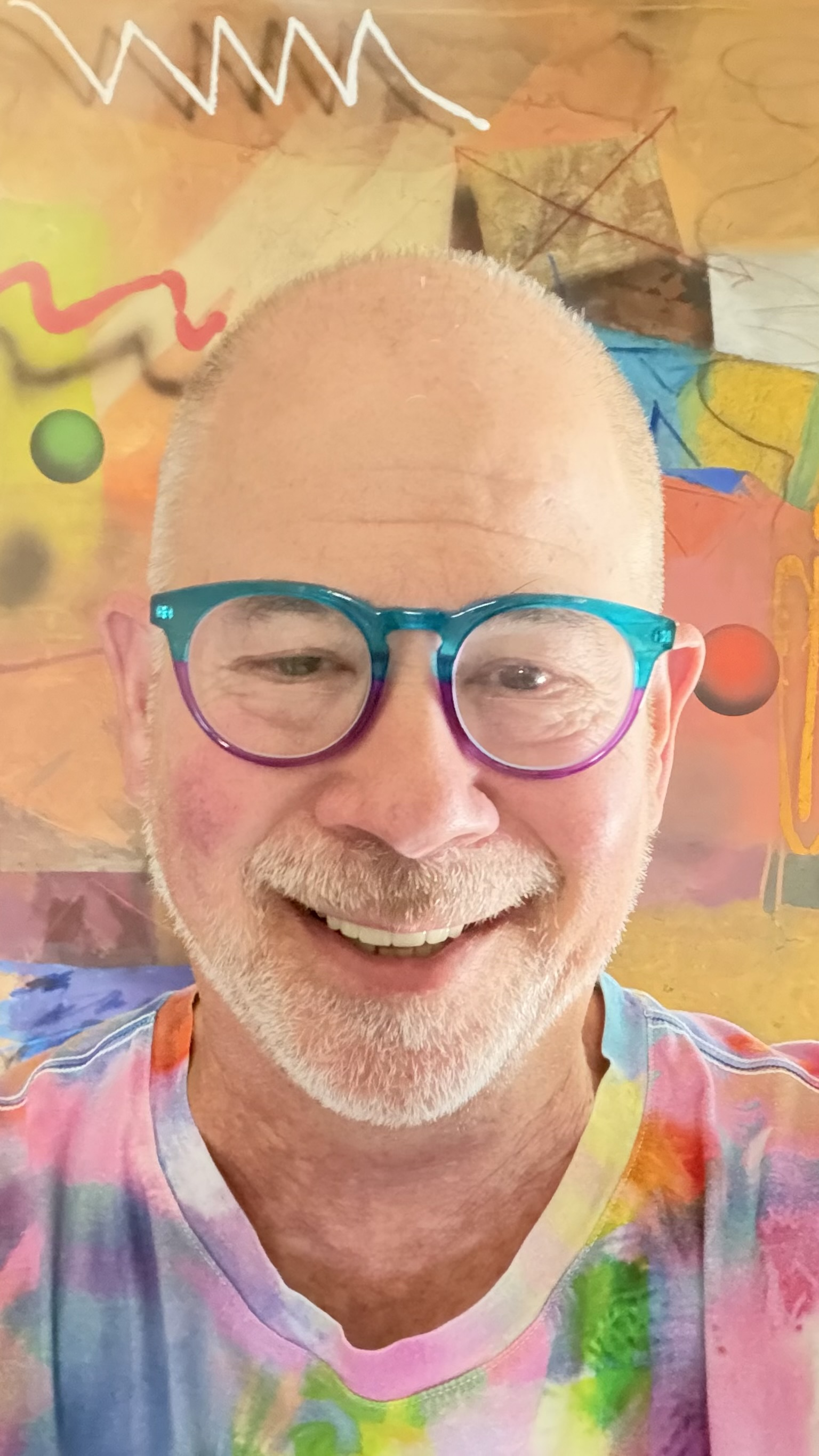
- Born: New York
- Education: University of Arizona; Arizona State University
- Awards: "Teacher of the Year" (Barrow Neurological Institute, 1994, 1995, 1998, 2004)
- Scientific career
- Fields: Neurosurgery, Artist
- Workplaces: Barrow Neurological Institute

Curtis Dickman (born August 4, 1959) is an American researcher, author, and retired neurosurgeon.

He was the Founder of the Spinal Biomechanics Research Laboratory, the Director of Spine Research, the Associate Chief of the Spine Section, and the Volker Sonntag Endowed Chair of Spinal Surgery at Barrow Neurological Institute (BNI). He was also the Professor of Neurosurgery at the Barrow Neurological Institute, The University of Arizona, and Creighton University.

== Education and early career ==
Dickman received his B.S. in Psychology from Arizona State University in 1981 and his M.D. from the University of Arizona, Tucson, AZ, in 1985.

Between 1986 and 1992, Dickman received Residency Training in Neurological Surgery at Barrow Neurological Institute. After completing his training, Dickman joined the faculty of the Department of Neurosurgery, specializing in neurosurgery of the spine.

In 1991, he completed a fellowship in Spinal Neurosurgery at the University of Florida.

In 1995, he earned board certification from the American Board of Neurological Surgery and also from the National Board of Medical Examiners.

== Career ==
=== Neurosurgery ===
In the early 1990s, Dickman initiated the development and popularization of endoscopic-assisted spine procedures within neurosurgery. He pioneered the field of thoracoscopic neurosurgery, becoming one of the first neurosurgeons to use endoscopes for treating diseases of the thoracic spine via a minimally invasive method.

In 1998, he treated the baseball pitcher Billy Wagner and made national headlines in 2003 when he helped save an 18-year-old patient Marcos Parra whose skull was ripped from his cervical spine in an automobile accident. Dickman adopted the technique of minimally invasive thoracoscopic spinal discectomy and fusion surgery for Cooper's treatment which gained recognition.

He was as a Scientific Reviewer and Chairman of the Scientific Program Committees of the North American Spine Society (NASS) and the Joint Spine Section of the AANS and CNS (1996). In 2015, Dickman retired from practicing medicine. He writes, produces diverse artwork, and aids humanitarian and philanthropic organizations.

Dickman founded a band, Crosstown Traffic, that helped raise more than $9 million for Arizona charities.

Dickman holds memberships in the American Association of Neurological Surgeons, the American Medical Association, the American Spinal Injury Association, the Arizona Medical Association, the Arizona Neurosurgical Society, the Congress of Neurological Surgeons, the Joint Section of Spinal Disorders and Peripheral Nerves, and the Maricopa County Medical Society.

He also served in numerous national leadership and committee roles, including appointments with the North American Spine Society (CPT Coding, Research and Grants Review, and Scientific Program Committees, including Chair), the Cervical Spine Research Society, and multiple committees and executive positions within the Congress of Neurological Surgeons and the Joint Section of Spinal Disorders and Peripheral Nerves, as well as national committee service for the American Medical Association and the American Association of Neurological Surgeons.

Dickman was an active author, reviewer, and editor of medical scientific literature. He was a senior editor of the journal Spine, and reviewed submissions for the journals Neurosurgery, Journal of Neurosurgery, the Lancet, the New England Journal of Medicine, and other medical journals. He authored 160 publications in peer-reviewed medical journals and edited/published 6 textbooks on spinal surgery.

=== Art ===
Dickman developed a parallel professional career as a contemporary visual artist whose practice centers on perceptual art, opticokinetic effects, and reverse-perspective sculpture, creating interactive mixed-media works that change according to the viewer's position. Based in Paradise Valley, Arizona, he has exhibited widely in Arizona and beyond and was appointed Artist in Residence for the Town of Paradise Valley (2025–2026), presenting a continuous year-long public exhibition at the town complex beginning in October 2025.

His work has been shown at the Barrow Neurological Institute, community and museum-style exhibitions in Phoenix and Scottsdale, and at multiple art galleries. A component of his artistic career is philanthropic practice: for more than a decade he has donated major works to benefit Childhelp, with numerous high-profile live auctions and commissions raising more than $250,000, including large-scale opticokinetic and sculptural works honoring figures such as Muhammad Ali, Sir Elton John, Jewel Pilcher and Keith Richards.

His artworks are held in private and institutional collections and he has created several celebrity portraits including Elton John, Henry Winkler, Claire Holt, and Jewel. Stylistically, Dickman cites the influence of artists such as Salvador Dalí, M. C. Escher, Pablo Picasso, Yaacov Agam, Andy Warhol, and Vincent van Gogh, and positions his practice at the intersection of visual perception, emotional narrative, and neuroscience.

=== Other works ===
Dickman launched Curtis Dickman Fine Art in Paradise Valley, Arizona around 2009 and has since developed a practice focused on vibrant mixed-media works, optical illusions, reverse-perspective constructions, and multimedia sculpture. His work explores perception, healing, and emotional narrative through optical and tactile elements that invite active viewer engagement.

As an author and advocate, Dickman wrote Living With Edwin (2022), a memoir that intertwines his art-therapy journey with experiences of childhood abuse, post-traumatic stress, and recovery, and pays tribute to his father's resilience.

=== Athlete ===
Dickman was active in endurance sports from 1988 through 2005, competing in swimming, cycling, and triathlons as part of his commitment to fitness and personal challenge. He completed multiple Olympic distance triathlons, and the Ironman Europe in Roth, Germany on July 10, 1994.

Dickman has participated in triathlons for more than a decade, and views swimming and cycling exercise as lifelong pursuits, reinforcing his dedication to multisport exercise alongside his professional career. Early involvement in triathlons placed him among a generation of age‑group athletes who embraced long‑course triathlon during its global expansion in the 1990s, when such races were growing in scale and international participation.

== Research ==
Dickman conducted influential research in spinal neurosurgery focused on spinal biomechanics, instrumentation, and minimally invasive techniques, with particular emphasis on the upper cervical spine, thoracic pathology, and complex spinal stabilization.

His work helped define the biomechanical behavior of C1–C2 fixation constructs, cable and wire systems, and transarticular screw techniques, and clarified the effects of procedures such as transoral odontoidectomy on atlantoaxial stability.

He also published clinical and biomechanical studies on lumbar and thoracic pedicle screw fixation vertebral artery injury during cervical surgery, and anatomical suitability of the upper cervical spine for internal fixation.

A major area of his research advanced thoracoscopic and endoscopic approaches to the thoracic spine, including large clinical series and technical studies demonstrating the safety and effectiveness of minimally invasive access for thoracic disc disease, trauma, deformity, and tumor surgery.

In addition to more than 160 peer-reviewed publications, Dickman contributed to major reference works in the field, including Spinal Cord and Spinal Column Tumors: Principles and Practice, Thoracoscopic Spine Surgery, Surgical Anatomy & Techniques to the Spine, and Surgery of the Craniovertebral Junction, which reflect his sustained scholarly leadership in complex spinal and craniovertebral surgery.

== Patents ==
- Plating system for stabilizing a bony segment, 2002, 2004, 2005, 2006
- Intervertebral disc replacement, 2002, 2006, 2007
- Spinal plating and intervertebral support systems and methods, 2006
- Anterior planting system and method, 2003, 2005

== Recent Publications ==
=== Medical Books ===
- Dickman CA, Fehlings M, Gokaslan ZL: Spinal Cord and Spinal Column Tumor. Thieme Medical Publishers
- Dickman CA, Spetzler RF, Sonntag VKH: Surgery of the Craniovertebral Junction. Thieme Medical Publishers, 1998
- Dickman CA, Rosenthal D, Perin N: Thoracoscopic Spine Surgery. Thieme Medical Publishers, 1999.
- Dickman CA, Kim D, Henn J, Vaccaro A: Surgical Anatomy and Techniques to the Spine

=== Medical Scientific Papers (Peer-Reviewed) ===
- Clark, J. C., Oppenlander, M. E., & Dickman, C. A. (2016). "Thoracoscopy: a minimally invasive approach to the anterior thoracic spine." Barrow Q, 26, 13–19.
- Oppenlander, ME; Kalani, MY; Dickman, CA (May 2012). "Spinal and paraspinal giant cervical cavernous malformation with postpartum presentation". J Neurosurg Spine. 16 (5): 447–51. doi:10.3171/2012.1.spine11630. PMID 22360563.
- Gantwerker, BR; Dickman, CA (Jul 2011). "Tandem intercostal thoracic schwannomas resected using a thoracoscopic nerve-sparing technique: case report". Neurosurgery. 69 (1): E225–9. doi:10.1227/neu.0b013e3182191430. PMID 21796067. S2CID 22077021.
- Wait, SD; Fox, DJ Jr; Kenny, KJ; Dickman, CA (Jan 2012). "Thoracoscopic resection of symptomatic herniated thoracic discs: clinical results in 121 patients". Spine. 37 (1): 35–40. doi:10.1097/brs.0b013e3182147b68. PMID 21336237. S2CID 22408101.
- Ponce, FA; Killory, BD; Wait, SD; Theodore, N; Dickman, CA (Mar 2011). "Endoscopic resection of intrathoracic tumors: experience with and long-term results for 26 patients". J Neurosurg Spine. 14 (3): 377–81. doi:10.3171/2010.11.spine09718. PMID 21250809.
- Wait, SD; Killory, BD; Lekovic, GP; Dickman, CA (Aug 2010). "Biportal thoracoscopic sympathectomy for palmar hyperhidrosis in adolescents". J Neurosurg Pediatr. 6 (2): 183–7. doi:10.3171/2010.5.peds09225. PMID 20672941.
- Wait, SD; Killory, BD; Lekovic, GP; Ponce, FA; Kenny, KJ; Dickman, CA (Sep 2010). "Thoracoscopic sympathectomy for hyperhidrosis: analysis of 642 procedures with special attention to Horner's syndrome and compensatory hyperhidrosis". Neurosurgery. 67 (3): 652–6. doi:10.1227/01.neu.0000374719.32137.bb. PMID 20647968. S2CID 21165164.
- Cavalcanti, DD; Martirosyan, NL; Verma, K; Safavi-Abbasi, S; Porter, RW; Theodore, N; Sonntag, VK; Dickman, CA; Spetzler, RF (May 2011). "Surgical management and outcome of schwannomas in the craniocervical region". J Neurosurg. 114 (5): 1257–67. doi:10.3171/2010.5.jns0966. PMID 20617880.
- Chang, SW; Kakarla, UK; Maughan, PH; DeSanto, J; Fox, D; Theodore, N; Dickman, CA; Papadopoulos, S; Sonntag, VK (Apr 2010). "Four-level anterior cervical discectomy and fusion with plate fixation: radiographic and clinical results". Neurosurgery. 66 (4): 639–46. doi:10.1227/01.neu.0000367449.60796.94. PMID 20305488. S2CID 24748646.
- Garrett, M; Consiglieri, G; Kakarla, UK; Chang, SW; Dickman, CA (Mar 2010). "Occipitoatlantal dislocation". Neurosurgery. 66 (3 Suppl): 48–55. doi:10.1227/01.neu.0000365802.02410.c5. PMID 20173527. S2CID 5880094.
- Little, AS; Brasiliense, LB; Lazaro, BC; Reyes, PM; Dickman, CA; Crawford, NR (Mar 2010). "Biomechanical comparison of costotransverse process screw fixation and pedicle screw fixation of the upper thoracic spine". Neurosurgery. 66 (3 Suppl): 178–82. doi:10.1227/01.neu.0000350869.35779.05. PMID 20173568. S2CID 38491599.
- Horn, EM; Feiz-Erfan, I; Lekovic, GP; Dickman, CA; Sonntag, VK; Theodore, N (Feb 2007). "Survivors of occipitoatlantal dislocation injuries: imaging and clinical correlates". J Neurosurg Spine. 6 (2): 113–20. doi:10.3171/spi.2007.6.2.113. PMID 17330577.
- Espinoza-Larios, A; Ames, CP; Chamberlain, RH; Sonntag, VK; Dickman, CA; Crawford, NR (Mar 2007). "Biomechanical comparison of two-level cervical locking posterior screw/rod and hook/rod techniques". Spine J. 7 (2): 194–204. doi:10.1016/j.spinee.2006.04.015. PMID 17321969.
- Hartl R, Theodore N, Dickman CA, Sonntag VKH (2004). "Technique of Thoracic Pedicle Screw Fixation for Trauma. Operative Techniques in Neurosurgery," (7) 1,22-30.
- Annes CP, Smith JS, Preul MC, Crawford NR, Kim GE, Nottmeier E, Chamberlain R, Speiser B, Sonntag VKH, Dickman CA., (2004). "Effect of Recombinant Human Bone Morphogenetic Protein-2 in an Experimental Model of Spinal Fusion in a Radiated Area." Spine(30) 23, 2585-2592
- Karahalios, D.G., Apostolides, P.J., Vishteh, A.G. and Dickman, C.A., (1997). "Thoracoscopic spinal surgery. Treatment of thoracic instability. Neurosurgery Clinics of North America," 8(4), pp. 555–573. doi:10.1016/S1042-3680(18)30300-0
- Romanelli DA, Dickman CA, Porter RW, Haynes RJ, (1996). "Comparison of Initial Injury Features In Cervical Spine Trauma C3-C7: Predictive Outcome with Halo Vest Management." J Spinal Disorders 9 (2): 146-149
- Dickman, C.A., Papadopoulos, S.M., Sonntag, V.K., Spetzler, R.F., Rekate, H.L. and Drabier, J., (1993). "Traumatic occipitoatlantal dislocations." Clinical Spine Surgery, 6(4), pp. 300–313. Dickman, C.A., Hadley, M.N., Browner, C. and Sonntag, V.K., (1989). "Neurosurgical management of acute atlas-axis combination fractures: a review of 25 cases." JournaNeurosurgeryrgery, 70(1), pp. 45–49. doi: 10.3171/jns.1989.70.1.0045
