= Banner University Medical Center Tucson =

Banner - University Medical Center Tucson
- Banner Health

Geography
- Location: 1501 North Campbell Avenue, Tucson, Arizona, United States
- Coordinates: 32°14′25″N 110°56′45″W

Organization
- Type: Teaching
- Affiliated university: University of Arizona

Services
- Emergency department: Level I Adult Trauma Center / Level II Pediatric Trauma Center
- Beds: 649

Helipads
- Helipad: FAA LID: 5AZ4
Number	Length		Surface
Number	ft	m	Surface
H1	40 x 40	12 × 12	mats
H2	40 x 40	12 × 12	mats

History
- Founded: 1971

Links
- Website: www.bannerhealth.com/tucson
- Lists: Hospitals in Arizona

Banner - University Medical Center Tucson (BUMCT), formerly University Medical Center and the University of Arizona Medical Center, is a private, non-profit, 649-bed acute-care teaching hospital located on the campus of the University of Arizona in Tucson, Arizona. BUMCT is the clinical partner of the University of Arizona College of Medicine – Tucson and is Southern Arizona's only trauma center for both adult and pediatric patients. BUMCT is one of two University of Arizona affiliated academic medical centers in Tucson with Banner - University Medical Center South (formerly Kino Community Hospital, University Physicians Healthcare Hospital, and University of Arizona Medical Center - South Campus) being the other such institution. The area's only dedicated children's hospital, Banner Children's at Diamond Children's Medical Center, is located within and adjacent to BUMCT, providing care to infants, children, teens, and young adults aged 0–21.

== History ==
The 8 story hospital was designed by the Tucson architecture firm of Friedman & Jobusch. The $18.2 Million construction contract was awarded to the Del E. Webb Corporation of Phoenix in March 1968. The adjacent School of Medicine completed a year prior was designed and built by the same firms. The 300 bed hospital was completed in late 1971.

When founded in 1971, the hospital was part of the University of Arizona. In the 1980s, it became a separate entity but, in 2010, was reintegrated into the University of Arizona under the name UA Health Network (UAHN).

In July 2009, the Banner - University Medical Center Tucson was designated a Level 1 Trauma Center by the American College of Surgeons.

The 2011 name change to the University of Arizona Medical Center (UAMC) reflected the need to combine all University of Arizona affiliated medical services: University Medical Center, University Physicians Healthcare, and the College of Medicine. In 2015, Banner Health based in Phoenix, Arizona, merged with UAHN and began a 30-year affiliation with the University of Arizona in which the facility was renamed to its present designation.

== Campus ==
As part of the merger between UAHN and Banner Health, the latter committed $500 million towards the construction of a new hospital and nearby outpatient clinic building. Designed by Shepley Bulfinch and built as a joint venture between Sundt and DPR Construction, groundbreaking occurred in early 2016. The $306 million, nine-story hospital tower contains over 200 new patient rooms and 19 new operating rooms. The tower was topped out February 2017 and was completed in the spring of 2019. It is the 5th tallest building in Tucson.

== Notable events ==
On January 8, 2011, Congresswoman Gabby Giffords was shot in an assassination attempt. Having been critically wounded after suffering a single gunshot wound to the head, she and many of the other 18 wounded individuals were promptly evacuated by helicopter to this facility. Giffords underwent emergency surgery by doctor Peter M. Rhee to save her life and many attribute her survival to the swift actions of the university's doctors. After her condition improved, doctors deemed her safe to travel so that she could begin speech, physical, and occupational therapy. Giffords was flown by plane to Houston's Memorial Hermann Medical Center on January 21, 2011, to continue therapy. In total, 6 people died in the shooting, including federal District Court Chief Judge John Roll; Gabe Zimmerman, one of Rep. Giffords' staffers; and a nine-year-old girl, Christina-Taylor Green.

== Graduate medical education ==
Through the University of Arizona College of Medicine, BUMCT hosts nearly 50 residency and fellowship programs across almost every speciality in medicine. Over 600 residents and fellows train at BUMCT and Banner - University Medical Center South (BUMCS) and all physicians who practice at these facilities have University of Arizona faculty appointments.

=== Residency programs ===
Anesthesiology	General Surgery	Ophthalmology	Psychiatry
Dermatology	Internal Medicine	Orthopaedic Surgery	Radiation Oncology
Emergency Medicine	Neurology	Otolaryngology	Radiology
Emergency Medicine/Pediatrics	Neurosurgery	Pathology	Urology
Family Medicine	Obstetrics & Gynecology	Pediatrics	Vascular Surgery

=== Fellowship programs ===
Acute Care	Endocrinology	Interventional Cardiology	Pediatric Pulmonary
Allergy & Immunology	Epilepsy	Maternal Fetal Medicine	Pulmonary and Critical Care Medicine
Anesthesia Critical Care	Gastroenterology	Medical Toxicology	Rheumatology
Anesthesia Pain Management	Gastrointestinal Pathology	Micrographic Surgery and Dermatologic Oncology	Sports Medicine
Behavioral Neurology	Geriatrics	Minimally Invasive Surgery	Stroke and Vascular Neurology
Body Imaging	Hematology and Medical Oncology	Molecular Genetics Pathology	Surgery Critical Care
Cardiovascular Disease	Hematopathology	Nephrology	Vascular and Interventional Radiology
Cardiothoracic Surgery	Hospice and Palliative Medicine	Neuroradiology	Vascular Surgery
Child and Adolescent Psychiatry	Infectious Diseases	Nuclear Medicine	Addiction Medicine
Emergency Medicine Critical Care	Integrative Medicine	Pediatric Endocrinology	Geriatric Psychiatry

== Associated centers and institutes ==
Banner - University Medical Center Tucson serves as the primary clinical partner for the University of Arizona Health Sciences' (UAHS) numerous multidisciplinary institutes and centers for excellence. These programs are a collaboration between the five colleges that comprise the UAHS: the University of Arizona College of Medicine - Tucson, College of Medicine - Phoenix, College of Nursing, College of Pharmacy, and the Mel and Enid Zuckerman College of Public Health.

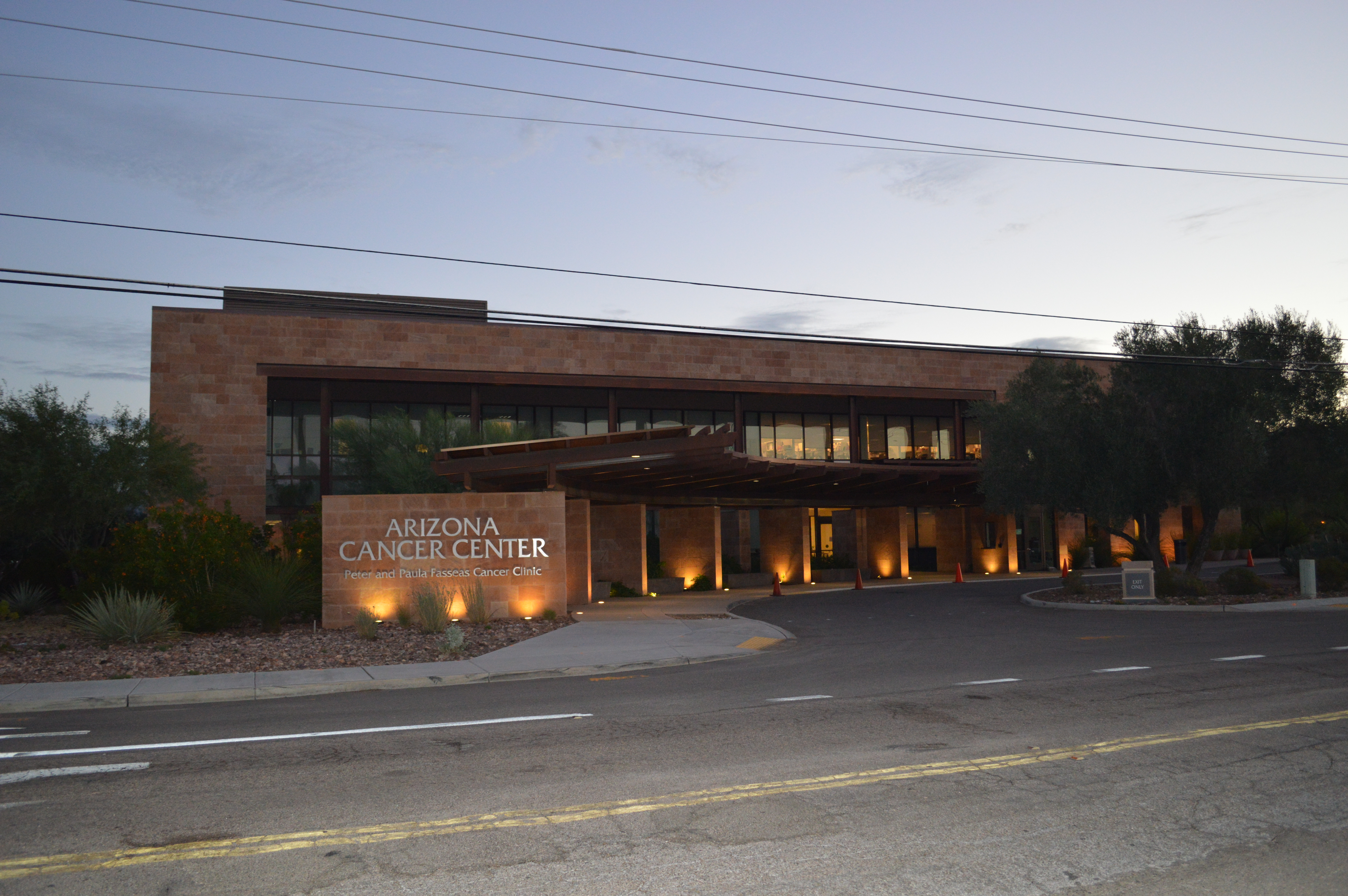
- Arizona Cancer Center - Peter and Paula Fasseas Cancer Clinic
  The University of Arizona Arthritis Center
- The University of Arizona Cancer Center
- Center for Biomedical Informatics and Biostatistics
- Arizona Center for Integrative Medicine
- Arizona Center on Aging
- University of Arizona Liver Research Institute
- Arizona Emergency Medicine Research Center
- Arizona Respiratory Center
- The University of Arizona Steele Children's Research Center
- The University of Arizona Sarver Heart Center
- Valley Fever Center for Excellence
- VIPER Institute

Adjacent and interrelated to BUMCT is the Arizona Cancer Center, an NCI cancer research and treatment facility. The medical center serves as the site of the programs' numerous clinical trials. Besides the hospital, Banner Health, via its University Medicine division, operates two hospital-based physician offices in Tucson, one hospital-based physician office in Green Valley, Arizona, and one medical transplant physician office in Phoenix (for pre- and post-transplant patients).

== Accreditation and recognition ==
- BUMCT is accredited by Joint Commission on Accreditation of Health Care Organizations (JCAHO) and the Council of Teaching Hospitals.
- BUMCT is an American Nurses Credentialing Center (ANCC) Magnet Hospital.
- For 2017, U.S. News & World Report ranked BUMCT #39 for Nephrology, #46 for Geriatrics and high-performing in five other specialties.
- The hospital specializes in multidisciplinary transplant programs and its blood and marrow transplant programs are among the best in the Southwest.
- Since 2005, Banner – University Medical Center Tucson has been listed as one of Solucient's Top 100 Hospitals.
- BUMC Tucson has been consistently ranked among the United States' best hospitals, according to U.S. News & World Report's annual guide to "America’s Best Hospitals."
- HealthGrades, a healthcare rating company, has found BUMC to be one of the best hospitals in Coronary Intervention.
- This hospital is a Great Place To Work Certified Jun 2025- Jun 2026.
