= University of Arizona College of Medicine – Phoenix =

Medical school at the University of Arizona

College of Medicine – Phoenix
- Type: Public medical school
- Established: 2007; 19 years ago
- Parent institution: University of Arizona
- Dean: Fredric E. Wondisford
- Location: Phoenix, Arizona, United States; 33.453°N 112.066°W
- Campus: Urban
- Colors: Cardinal and navy
- Nickname: Wildcats
- Mascot: Wilbur and Wilma T. Wildcat
- Website: phoenixmed.arizona.edu

The College of Medicine – Phoenix is a medical school at the University of Arizona, the State of Arizona's flagship public research university.

The school and its associated research organization is affiliated with several hospitals and medical centers, including Banner - University Medical Center Phoenix, Phoenix Children's Hospital, Mayo Clinic Arizona, the Phoenix VA Health Care System, and St. Joseph's Hospital and Medical Center (home to the Barrow Neurological Institute, the No. 1 neurosurgery residency program in the United States).

For the class of 2028, the school received more than 5,500 applications to fill 130 seats in the MD Program.

== History ==
The College of Medicine at the University of Arizona was founded in Tucson in 1967 with an initial class of 32 students. Now called the College of Medicine - Tucson, it has grown to enroll approximately 120 students annually and has graduated over 4,000 physicians since its inception. By 1983, students at the College of Medicine - Tucson were taking required clerkships in the Phoenix area in internal medicine, pediatrics, neurology, obstetrics and gynecology, and family practice, as well as clinical electives. By 1991 one-third of the College of Medicine - Tucson students spent a portion of their third year in Phoenix. In 1992, a Phoenix program was officially established to allow the school's 3rd and 4th year medical students to complete clinical clerkships at Phoenix-area hospitals.

In 2004, the Arizona Board of Regents approved the expansion of the program, and an agreement was reached to lease buildings in the new Phoenix Biomedical Campus (PBC) to the University of Arizona. On May 20, 2005, Governor Janet Napolitano signed House Bill 2768 appropriating $6 million to the new college. In 2006, the historic buildings of the former Phoenix Union High School completed restoration and were subsequently opened and dedicated. In July 2007, the College of Medicine - Phoenix was formally opened and its inaugural class of 24 students was admitted to begin their studies in August. The next year, the class size increased to 48 per year. In 2012, the Liaison Committee on Medical Education (LCME) granted preliminary accreditation to the college, with full accreditation in 2017. By 2024 the incoming class size was 130, and in 2024 the inaugural graduates of the college's MD/PhD dual-degree program received their degrees. The recruitment and admissions processes for MDs at the two colleges are now separate, but both are part of the University of Arizona.

The Arizona State Legislature allocated funds for the expansion of the biomedical campus in Phoenix, allowing for the construction of the Health Sciences Education Building which opened in 2012. That expansion has helped the university continue to address the critical need for physicians in Arizona. In February 2017, the Biomedical Sciences Partnership Building officially opened, which houses basic and clinical biomedical research on topics including cardiovascular disease, cancer, and neurological and psychiatric disorders. As of October 2024, construction was underway on a new building that will house the University of Arizona Health Sciences Center for Advanced Molecular and Immunological Therapies.
