= The American Journal of Medicine =

- Discipline: Medicine
- Language: English
- Edited by: Joseph S. Alpert

Publication details
- History: 1946–present
- Publisher: Elsevier
- Frequency: Monthly
- Impact factor: 5.928 (2021)

Standard abbreviations
- ISO 4: Am. J. Med.

Indexing
- CODEN: AJMEAZ
- ISSN: 0002-9343 (print); 1555-7162 (web)
- LCCN: med47002270
- OCLC no.: 01480156

Links
- Journal homepage; Online access

The American Journal of Medicine is a peer-reviewed medical journal and the official journal of the Alliance for Academic Internal Medicine. It was established in 1946. The journal is published monthly by Elsevier. It is also known as "the green journal". Elsevier's former sister company Cahners Publishing acquired The American Journal of Medicine's publisher Technical Publishing in 1986.

Joseph S. Alpert, a cardiologist and professor of medicine at the University of Arizona College of Medicine, became editor-in-chief of the journal in 2004, and the editorial office was moved to Tucson, Arizona.

== Abstracting and indexing ==
The journal is abstracted and indexed in:

- BIOSIS Previews
- CINAHL
- Chemical Abstracts
- Current Contents/Clinical Medicine
- Current Contents/Life Sciences
- EMBASE
- Global Health
- Index Medicus/MEDLINE/PubMed
- Science Citation Index
- Scopus
