= H. Winter Griffith =

American physician

Dr. H. Winter Griffith (1926–1993) was an American physician who authored 27 popular medical books. His books include The Complete Guide to Symptoms, Illness, and Surgery and Complete Guide to Prescription and Nonprescription Drugs. Multiple editions have been published, even after his death, and these books are the basis for the health library on the popular web site MDadvice.com . Griffith's books have been renowned as easy for patients to read and understand.

Griffith was a graduate of Emory University medical school. He ran a family medical practice for 20 years, and taught at Florida State University and University of Arizona College of Medicine.

Griffith, during his lifetime, suffered many health problems of his own, including heart disease and cancer. He underwent many treatments, including a heart transplant. He died in 1993 at the age of 67 from bone cancer.

An award, known as the H. Winter Griffith Award, is offered in recognition of an individual's or organization's contribution in patient education materials. It was created in 1990, and includes a $500 prize and a $300 stipend for its recipient.
