= Joseph Alpert =

American cardiologist and academic

Joseph S. Alpert
- Born: 1942; Connecticut, United States
- Citizenship: American
- Education: Yale University (BA); Harvard Medical School (MD)
- Known for: Universal definition of myocardial infarction, Editor-in-chief of the American Journal of Medicine
- Scientific career
- Fields: Cardiology
- Institutions: University of Massachusetts (1978–1992); University of Arizona College of Medicine (1992–present)

Joseph Stephen Alpert (born 1942 in Connecticut) is an American cardiologist and professor of medicine at the University of Arizona Sarver Heart Center. He is also the editor-in-chief of the American Journal of Medicine.

== Education ==
Alpert received his bachelor's degree from Yale University magna cum laude. He later received his medical doctorate from Harvard Medical School, cum laude.

== Career ==
In 1978, Alpert joined the faculty of the University of Massachusetts as professor and chief of the Section of Cardiovascular Medicine. In 1992, he was appointed the Robert S. and Irene P. Flinn Professor of Medicine and Chair of the Department of Medicine at the University of Arizona College of Medicine. He stepped down from this position in 2006 to join the dean's administrative team at this college.

== Research ==
Alpert is known for helping create a universal definition of myocardial infarction, in his capacity as cochair of the Joint European Society of Cardiology-American College of Cardiology Foundation-American Heart Association-World Heart Federation Task Force for the Universal Definition of Myocardial Infarction. He has published more than 700 original research articles, reviews, editorials, and clinical reports as well as writing or editing more than 50 books.
