= Terence Valenzuela =

American physician

Terence D. Valenzuela
- Education: Harvard University; University of Oxford; University of California, San Francisco; University of Arizona
- Occupations: Physician, researcher, educator
- Employer: University of Arizona College of Medicine – Tucson
- Known for: Research on out-of-hospital cardiac arrest, emergency medical services (EMS), and prehospital care
- Title: Professor Emeritus of Emergency Medicine

Terence D. Valenzuela is an American physician, researcher, and educator specializing in emergency medicine and pre-hospital care. He is Professor Emeritus of Emergency Medicine at the University of Arizona College of Medicine – Tucson, and his work has significantly shaped research, policy, and practice in out-of-hospital cardiac arrest (OHCA), EMS system design, and emergency medical services administration.

== Early life and education ==
Valenzuela received his Bachelor of Arts in biology from Harvard University, graduating magna cum laude. As a Rhodes Scholar at the University of Oxford, he pursued studies in biochemistry. He earned his Doctor of Medicine (MD) degree from the University of California, San Francisco in 1980, and later obtained a Master of Public Health (MPH) with an emphasis in epidemiology from the University of Arizona in 1995.

== Academic and professional career ==
After completing medical school, Valenzuela held positions at the University of Washington before joining the University of Arizona, where he has spent the bulk of his professional career. Over several decades, he served in the Department of Emergency Medicine at the University of Arizona College of Medicine – Tucson, earning promotion to tenured professor and ultimately achieving the title of professor emeritus.

Valenzuela served for 34 years as the medical director for the Tucson Fire Department, overseeing medical care provided by paramedics and emergency medical technicians (EMTs), developing policies for prehospital resuscitation, and engaging in quality assurance for OHCA cases. His leadership extended to shaping EMS practices in southern Arizona and linking academic research with operational EMS systems.

He has also contributed to studies of regulatory issues, such as evaluating how ambulance service is regulated in Arizona. For example, in Medical versus Regulatory Necessity: Regulation of Ambulance Service in Arizona, Valenzuela and co-authors examined how statutory criteria for ambulance "need" affect both costs and EMS operations.

== Research contributions ==
Valenzuela's research is distinguished by its focus on prehospital care, especially out-of-hospital cardiac arrest, and by applying public health frameworks to emergency medical systems. He has been instrumental in defining rigorous case definitions for OHCA, analyzing the relationships between time intervals—such as collapse-to-CPR and collapse-to-defibrillation—and survival outcomes, and exploring how minimal training for first responders (for example, basic CPR with AED orientation) can dramatically increase survival to hospital discharge.

His investigations include analyses of manual chest compression techniques in the field, assessment of prehospital interventions such as dispatcher-assisted CPR, evaluation of scene times and their impact on survival, and modeling EMS system performance to assess resource deployment and base station placement.

== Recognition and certifications ==
Valenzuela is a diplomate of both the American Board of Internal Medicine and the American Board of Emergency Medicine. He is a Fellow of the American College of Physicians and the American College of Emergency Physicians. Among his honors are being named the first medical director for the Tucson Fire Department and receiving the Michael K. Copass Excellence in EMS Award.

== Selected publications ==
- Valenzuela, T.D.; Roe, D.J.; Nichol, G. (2000). "Outcomes of rapid defibrillation by security officers after cardiac arrest in casinos". New England Journal of Medicine. 343 (17). Massachusetts Medical Society: 1206–1209. doi:10.1056/NEJM200010263431701.
- Valenzuela, T.D.; Roe, D.J.; Cretin, S.; Spaite, D.W. (1997). "Estimating effectiveness of cardiac arrest interventions: a logistic regression survival model". Circulation. 96 (10). American Heart Association: 3308–3313. doi:10.1161/01.CIR.96.10.3308.
- Kern, K.B.; Valenzuela, T.D.; Clark, L.L.; Berg, R.A.; Hilwig, R.W. (2005). "An alternative approach to advancing resuscitation science". Resuscitation. 64 (3). Elsevier: 261–268. doi:10.1016/j.resuscitation.2004.09.008.
- Valenzuela, T.D.; Spaite, D.W.; Meislin, H.W. (1993). "Emergency vehicle intervals versus collapse-to-CPR and collapse-to-defibrillation intervals: monitoring emergency medical services system performance in sudden cardiac arrest". Annals of Emergency Medicine. 22 (10). Elsevier: 1678–1683. doi:10.1016/S0196-0644(05)81315-2.
- Valenzuela, T.D.; Criss, E.A.; Spaite, D.; Meislin, H.W. (1990). "Cost-effectiveness analysis of paramedic emergency medical services in the treatment of prehospital cardiopulmonary arrest". Annals of Emergency Medicine. 19 (12). Elsevier: 1407–1411. doi:10.1016/S0196-0644(05)81632-4.
- Valenzuela, T.D.; Criss, E.A.; Copass, M.K.; Luna, G.K. (1990). "Critical care air transportation of the severely injured: does long distance transport adversely affect survival?". Annals of Emergency Medicine. 19 (2). Elsevier: 169–172. doi:10.1016/S0196-0644(05)81749-6.
- Valenzuela, T.D.; Spaite, D.W.; Meislin, H.W.; Clark, L.L. (1992). "Case and survival definitions in out-of-hospital cardiac arrest: effect on survival rate calculation". JAMA. 267 (2). American Medical Association: 272–275. doi:10.1001/jama.1992.03480020084038.
- Valenzuela, T.D.; Goldberg, J.; Keeley, K.T. (1990). "Computer modeling of emergency medical system performance". Annals of Emergency Medicine. 19 (12). Elsevier: 1412–1415. doi:10.1016/S0196-0644(05)81633-6.
