= Banner - University Medical Center Phoenix =

Hospital in Phoenix, Arizona, U.S.

- Banner Health

Geography
- Location: 1111 East McDowell Road, Phoenix, Arizona, U.S.
- Coordinates: 33.4644°N 112.0588°W

Organisation
- Type: Teaching
- Affiliated university: University of Arizona College of Medicine – Phoenix

Services
- Emergency department: Level I trauma center
- Beds: 746

Helipads
- Helipad: FAA LID: AZ48
Number	Length		Surface
Number	ft	m	Surface
H1	129 x 69	39 × 21	concrete

History
- Former names: Arizona Deaconess Hospital; Good Samaritan Medical Center
- Opened: 1911 (115 years ago) in Phoenix, Arizona, United States

Links
- Website: www.bannerhealth.com/locations/phoenix/banner-university-medical-center-phoenix
- Lists: Hospitals in U.S.

Banner - University Medical Center Phoenix (BUMCP; formerly Banner Good Samaritan Medical Center or "Good Sam") is a 746-bed non-profit, acute care teaching hospital located in Phoenix, Arizona, providing tertiary care and healthcare services to the Arizona region and surrounding states. Banner - University Medical Center Phoenix is a hospital of the Banner Health System and is one of the flagship facilities of the system. The hospital is affiliated with the University of Arizona Colleges of Medicine in Phoenix and Tucson. The hospital is an American College of Surgeons verified Level 1 Trauma Center and has a rooftop helipad to transport critically ill patients from within the region.

The hospital is ranked on the U.S. News & World Report as the #2 hospital in Arizona after Mayo Clinic Phoenix.

Banner Health was named one of the best places to work in health care according to the Fortune Best Workplaces in Health Care™ list in 2025.

== History ==
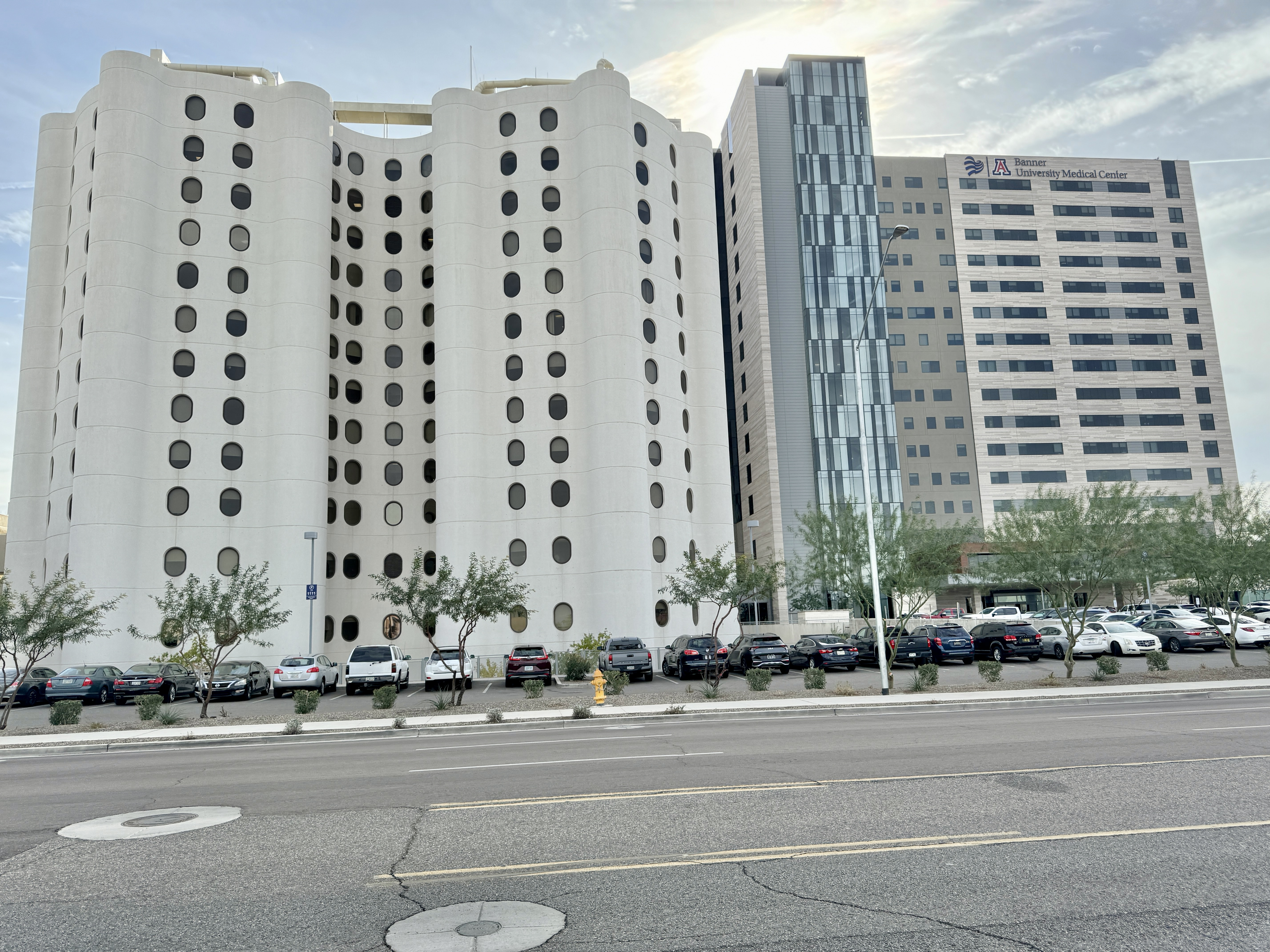
Banner - University Medical Center Phoenix in December 2023

Lulu Clifton, a Deaconess in the Methodist Church from Nebraska, arrived in Phoenix in 1900, against her doctor's advice, to recover from tuberculosis. As she recovered, Clifton saw a need for a hospital in the growing desert town. Clifton, with the help of other prominent Methodists, founded the Arizona Deaconess Hospital in 1911 in a rented apartment building in downtown Phoenix and started a nurse training program.

In 1917, the group acquired land on McDowell Road and 10th Street (a remote area of rural Phoenix at the time) for a permanent hospital structure which, after construction was delayed during World War I, opened to the public in 1923. The modern complex sits on the site to this day. The hospital's name was changed to Good Samaritan Hospital in 1928.

In 1969, transplant surgeons at Banner Good Samaritan performed the first successful kidney transplant in Arizona.

In 1978, Good Samaritan broke ground for a 12-story, 720 bed hospital tower which opened in 1982. This tower, designed by noted Chicago architect Bertrand Goldberg (best known for his iconic Marina City complex), featured his signature ultra-modern architecture, making the tower a Phoenix architectural icon. The expansion also made Good Samaritan the largest hospital in Arizona to date.

Phoenix Children's Hospital was originally opened in 1983 as an independent children's hospital that was physically located within Good Samaritan Hospital. With 124 dedicated pediatric beds, it operated there for nearly 20 years. In September 1985 the hospital performed the first pediatric liver transplant in Arizona. A year later the hospital expanded to take over all of Good Samaritan's pediatric services adding 24 beds with the acquisition, again expanding in 1993 adding another 24 beds for a total of 172 pediatric beds.

In 2015 Banner Good Samaritan Medical Center was renamed to Banner - University Medical Center Phoenix to reflect Banner's merger with the University of Arizona.

=== New construction ===
Banner will invest nearly $1 billion in new clinics and hospital towers in Tucson and Phoenix. Those projects include a $179 million emergency department scheduled to open July 2017, a $239 million patient tower set to open in late 2018, and a $50 million clinical space near the existing BUMCP facility. The 700,000-sq.-ft. Emergency Department and patient tower expansion project includes a three-story podium that accommodates the emergency department relocation, new observation space on the first floor, and new operating rooms and administration on the second floor. The 13-story patient tower will house 256 patient beds as well as two shell floors for future build-out.

== Teaching ==
The medical center hosts third and fourth year medical students from its major affiliated medical school, the University of Arizona College of Medicine - Phoenix. It is also home to several residency training programs sponsored by the College of Medicine. These include Obstetrics and Gynecology, Internal Medicine, General Surgery, Psychiatry, Orthopaedic Surgery, Family Medicine, Neurology, Medicine/Pediatrics, and Oral Maxillofacial Surgery. A number of fellowship programs are also sponsored. In total, over 300 residents and fellows are based at the facility.

== See also ==
- Phoenix Children's Hospital
- Banner Health
- Bertrand Goldberg
- University of Arizona
