= Bradley J. Monk =

American gynecologic oncologist

- Occupations: Gynecologic Oncologist, academician and researcher
- Awards: Fellow, American Cancer Society of Clinical Oncology

Academic background
- Education: B.S., Premedical Zoology; M.D.
- Alma mater: Brigham Young University; University of Arizona College of Medicine – Tucson

Bradley J. Monk is an American gynecologic oncologist, academician and researcher. He is a professor on the Clinical Scholar Track in the Department of Obstetrics and Gynecology at the University of Arizona College of Medicine in Phoenix, Arizona, as well as at the Creighton University School of Medicine in Omaha, Nebraska. He also serves as Director of the Division of Gynecologic Oncology at the St. Joseph's Hospital and Medical Center in Phoenix.

Monk has authored and co-authored over 300 peer-reviewed publications, and has focused his research on gynecologic surgery-complex, cervical cancer, ovarian cancer, and other gynecologic cancers. He has received the Ernst Wertheim Award for his research in cervical cancer. Monk is a fellow of the American Society of Clinical Oncology and the Society of Gynecologic Oncology. He is on the board of directors for the GOG Foundation. He is an Associate Editor for Annals of Oncology.

== Education ==
Monk studied at Brigham Young University and received his bachelor's degree in Premedical Zoology in 1982. He graduated from the University of Arizona College of Medicine-Tucson in 1988, and completed his residency in Obstetrics and Gynecology the University of California, Los Angeles in 1992. Between 1988 and 1995, he completed his fellowship in medical genetics at National Institutes of Health (NIH), and in Gynecologic Oncology at M. D. Anderson Cancer Center Houston and the University of California, Irvine.

== Career ==
Upon completing his residency, Monk held appointment as a Clinical Instructor in the Department of Obstetrics and Gynecology at the University of California, before joining Texas Tech University Health Sciences Center in 1995 as an assistant professor of Obstetrics and Gynecology and Director of Division of Gynecologic Oncology. From 1997 till 1998, he served there as an assistant professor in the Department of General Surgery. He was then appointed as an assistant professor of Obstetrics and Gynecology till 2004, and as a tenured associate professor till 2010 at Irvine Medical Center at University of California. Along with this appointment, he held a brief co-appointment at University of Nevada School of Medicine as a Clinical Assistant Professor from 2001 till 2003. He was then appointed as a professor at Creighton University School of Medicine in 2010, and as Professor in the Department of Obstetrics and Gynecology at University of Arizona College of Medicine in Phoenix in 2012.

Monk held appointment as Gynecologic Oncologist at St. Joseph's Hospital and Medical Center in 2010, and became a Gynecologic Oncologist at Arizona Oncology (US Oncology Network) Biltmore Cancer Center in 2016. He was also appointed by Scottsdale Healthcare and Banner in the Phoenix metropolitan area as a Gynecologic Oncologist.

== Research ==
Monk's research is primarily focused on the prevention and treatment of gynecologic cancers. He was the pioneer to report the activity of anti-vascular growth factor (VEGF) therapy in ovarian cancer and his papers in the New England Journal of Medicine led to the global approval of antiVEGF therapy in recurrent cervical cancer in 2014 and advanced ovarian in 2018. He was also the lead author on the trial of trabectedin in recurrent ovarian cancer.

=== Cervical cancer ===
In his study regarding cervical cancer, Monk reviewed several patients which had uterine sarcoma with cervical involvement, a poor response to preoperative radiation, and a poor response to preoperative radiation. Results of his study indicated that radical hysterectomy after radiation is morbid but might be effective in context of treating patients with small recurrent cervical tumors, cervical cancer that responds poorly to radiation, large cervical tumors, patients unable to undergo brachytherapy for cervical cancer, and uterine sarcomas involving the cervix.

Monk also focused his study on the treatment and prevention of cervical cancer and other HPV-associated malignancies using HPV vaccines, and discussed promises and challenges regarding it. In his paper published in 2007, he demonstrated a methodology for examining the impact of HCII testing in terms of the direct cost of cervical cancer cytological screening.

Monk has been the global leader in systemic therapy in cervical cancer. First in 1999, he contributed to the integration of chemotherapy in treating locally advanced disease with radiation. Then, in 2009 Monk defined the systemic therapy standard of care of recurrent cervical cancer being the combination of a platinum medication and paclitaxel (taxane).

He also investigated the usage of targeted therapies in cervical cancer, and evaluated the antiangiogenesis and endothelial growth factor receptor-related treatments. This led to the global approval of the first targeted therapy in gynecologic cancer. The publication in the New England Journal of Medicine (NEJM) of GOG 240 created a new life prolonging standard treatment for persistent, metastatic and recurrent cervical cancer adding bevacizumab to existing options.

In addition to chemotherapy added to radiation and chemotherapy to treat recurrent cervical cancer and the development of bevacizumab, Monk is also works to advance immunotherapeutic treatments for cervical cancer. He is the committee chair and co-first author for EMPOWER-Cervical 1/GOG-3016/ENGOT-cx9. This phase 3 randomized trial compared cemiplimab to investigator's choice chemotherapy in recurrent/metastatic cervical carcinoma showed a clinically relevant improvement in survival rates. This is the first randomized trial of immune therapy in cervical cancer to meet its primary and secondary endpoints.

In 2020, he together with co-authors, designed the CALLA trial for the purpose of determining the efficacy of the programmed cell death-ligand 1 blocking antibody, durvalumab, with and following concurrent chemoradiotherapy versus concurrent chemoradiotherapy alone in women with locally advanced cervical cancer.

Finally, he also conducted a study regarding the usage of sequential chemotherapy in terms of treating early-stage, post–radical hysterectomy cervical cancer. Most recently, Monk has helped develop antibody drug conjugates such as tisotumab vedotin. This new call of agents has great potential to revolutionize the therapeutic landscape.

=== Ovarian cancer ===
Monk published a paper in 2005 focused the role of pegylated liposomal doxorubicin in context of ovarian cancer. Results of his study showed the effectiveness of pegylated liposomal doxorubicin in relapsed ovarian cancer and the improved cardiac safety of pegylated liposomal doxorubicin in comparison to conventional anthracyclines. He also conducted a study based on the contributions of 19 genes identified in the literature as increasing the risk of hereditary breast and ovarian cancer (HBOC) in a BRCA1 and BRCA2 negative population of patients with a personal history of breast and/or ovarian cancer by means of a hereditary cancer panel.

The next major accomplishment for Monk in ovarian cancer came in 2010 with the development of trabectedin in recurrent cancer. This novel medication is approved and used extensively around the world. Monk suggested the integration of the tumor genomic profiling with immune profiling in terms of providing a more comprehensive understanding of an individual patient's tumor leading to improved treatment selection and sequencing.

Monk has also been a leader in the field of inhibition of Poly (ADP-ribose) polymerase (PARP) in advanced and recurrent ovarian cancer. His pivotal publications in the NEJM have led to global approvals and adoption of Niraparib in recurrent and newly diagnosed advanced ovarian cancer.

Monk was the first in the world to describe the activity of bevacizumab in 2005 to treat recurrent ovarian cancer. He and his colleagues then published many more papers on new targets and the inhibition of antiangiogenesis in ovarian cancer culminating in two NEJM medications and global regulatory approval and adoption.

Monk has also focused on rare variants of ovarian cancer such as low-grade serous cancers. His pivotal study of binimetinib showed activity of this MEK inhibitor in a setting of high unmet need. Like ovarian cancer, he is developing immune therapy in ovarian cancer and studies avelumab and nivolumab alone or in combination.

While discussing COVID-19 and ovarian cancer together, Monk explored different alternatives to intravenous (IV) therapies and stated that minimizing patient visits to hospitals and cancer clinics may help mitigate the spread of SARS-CoV-2. Furthermore, he studied the history evidence based on the asbestos and its association with ovarian cancer, while giving reference to WHO's International Agency for Research on Cancer. He also highlighted the application of novel strategies and emerging targets in context of treating the patients with advanced disease.

=== Quality of life and the patient experience ===
Monk, along with his colleagues, launched the first study of patient reported outcomes to describe the quality of life in clinical trials with the first report being in 2005. He has been the principal investigator of several quality of life studies to help better define the patient experience and address unmet needs to enhance survivorship.

== Bibliography ==
- Monk, B., Grisham, R., Banerjee, S., Kalbacher, E., Mirza, M., Romero, I., Vuylsteke, P., Coleman, R., Hilpert, F., Oza, A., Westermann, A., Oehler, M., Pignata, S., Aghajanian, C., Colombo, N., Drill, E., Cibula, D., Moore, K., Christy-Bittel, J., Campo, J.M., Berger, R., Marth, C., Sehouli, J., O'malley, D., Churruca, C., Boyd, A., Kristensen, G., Clamp, A., Ray-Coquard, I., & Vergote, I. (2020). MILO/ENGOT-ov11: Binimetinib Versus Physician's Choice Chemotherapy in Recurrent or Persistent Low-Grade Serous Carcinomas of the Ovary, Fallopian Tube, or Primary Peritoneum. Journal of Clinical Oncology, 38, 3753 – 3762.
- Eakin, C., Ewongwo, A., Pendleton, L., Monk, B., & Chase, D. (2020). Real world experience of poly (ADP-ribose) polymerase inhibitor use in a community oncology practice. Gynecologic oncology.
- Oaknin, A., Friedman, C., Roman, L., D'souza, A., Braña, I., Clement-Bidard, F., Goldman, J., Alvarez, E., Boni, V., ElNaggar, A., Passalacqua, R., Do, K., Santin, A., Keyvanjah, K., Xu, F., Eli, L.D., Lalani, A., Bryce, R., Hyman, D., Meric-Bernstam, F., Solit, D., & Monk, B. (2020). Neratinib in patients with HER2-mutant, metastatic cervical cancer: Findings from the phase 2 SUMMIT basket trial. Gynecologic oncology.
- Arend, R., Jackson-Fisher, A., Jacobs, I., Chou, J., & Monk, B. (2021). Ovarian cancer: new strategies and emerging targets for the treatment of patients with advanced disease. Cancer Biology & Therapy, 22, 89 – 105.
- Eakin, C., Ewongwo, A., Pendleton, L., Monk, B., & Chase, D. (2020). Real world experience of poly (ADP-ribose) polymerase inhibitor use in a community oncology practice. Gynecologic oncology.
