= Peter M. Rhee =

American surgeon

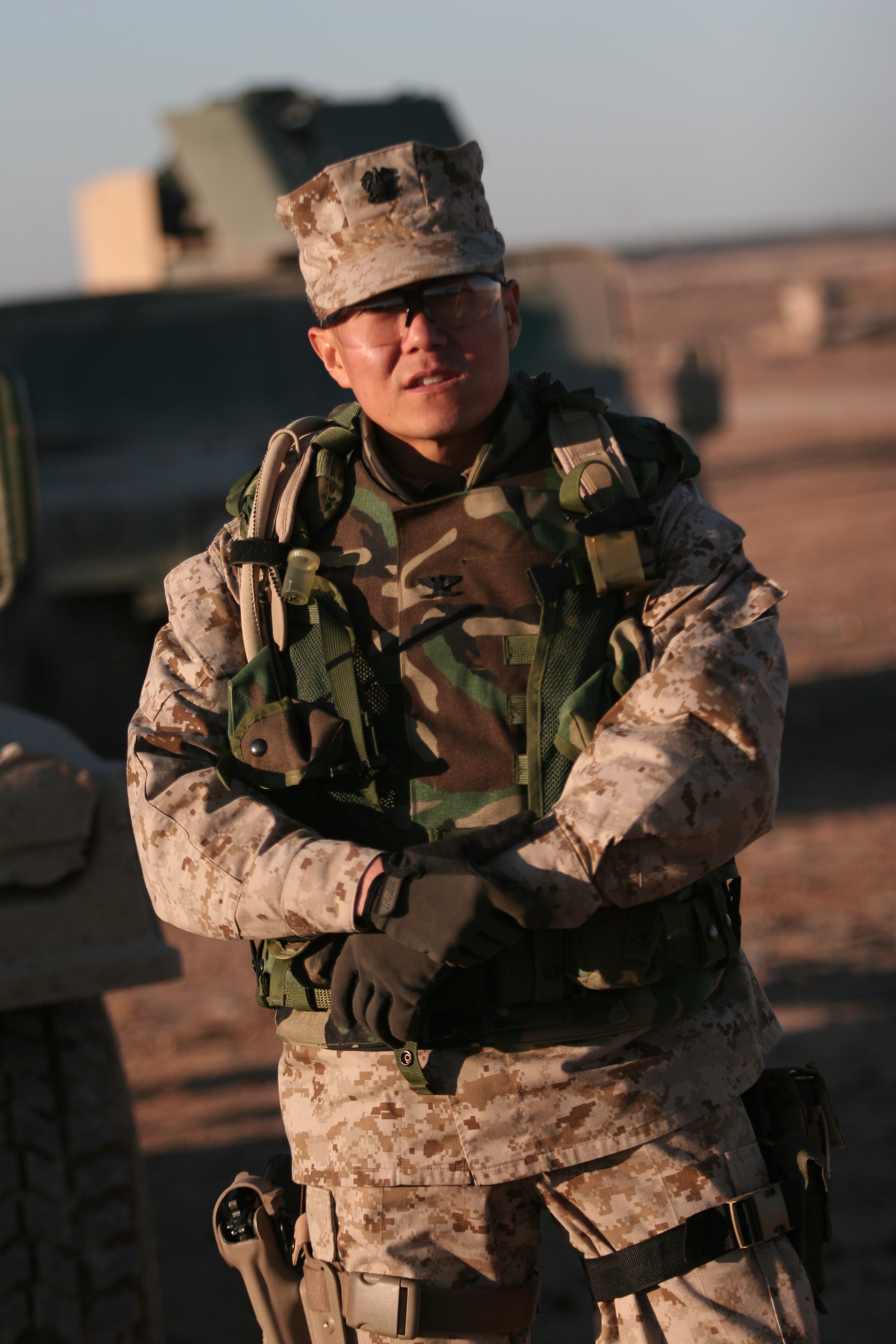
- Born: September 18, 1961 (age 65); Seoul, South Korea
- Military career
- Allegiance: United States of America
- Branch: United States Navy
- Service years: 1983–2007
- Rank: Captain
- Commands: Navy Trauma Training Center at Los Angeles County+USC Medical Center
- Conflicts: Operation Enduring Freedom; Iraq War
- Awards: Defense Meritorious Service Medal; Navy Commendation Medal
- Other work: Professor of Surgery at the University of Arizona; Chief of Trauma at the University Medical Center (Tucson)

Peter Meong Rhee (born September 18, 1961) is an American surgeon, medical professor, and military veteran. During his 24 years in the United States Navy, Rhee served as a battlefield casualty physician in Afghanistan and Iraq.

Formerly a Professor of Surgery and the Chief of Trauma, Critical Care, and Burn and Emergency Surgery at the University of Arizona College of Medicine until 2016, he then served as the Chief of Surgery at the Marcus Trauma Center at Grady Memorial Hospital in Atlanta, Georgia. Currently he is the Director of the surgical ICU at St. Barnabas Hospital in the Bronx, New York. Now he is Professor of Surgery at the Uniformed Services University of the Health Sciences in Bethesda Maryland, Morehouse School of Medicine and is a tenured Professor of Surgery at the New York Medical College in Valhalla, New York. He rose to national prominence when he served as the attending physician to U.S. Representative Gabby Giffords of Arizona, as well as other victims, following the 2011 Tucson shooting.

In 2014, he published a memoir titled TRAUMA RED: The Making of a Surgeon in War and in America's Cities.

== Early life and education ==
Born in Seoul, South Korea, Rhee lived for several years in Uganda where his father, a surgeon, worked in a clinic in Torroro, Uganda. The elder Rhee moved the family to the United States when his son was 10 to get a better education. The family was raised in a small Pennsylvania town, south of Pittsburgh. His father was an anesthesiologist at Uniontown Hospital. Rhee graduated in 1979 from Laurel Highlands High School in Fayette County and earned his Bachelor of Science degree in Health Systems Engineering from the Georgia Institute of Technology in 1983. In 1987, Rhee earned his medical degree from the Uniformed Services University of Health Sciences F. Edward Hebert School of Medicine. He also earned a master's degree in Public Health from the University of Washington Department of Health Services. In 1999, he earned a diploma in Medical Care of Catastrophes from the Society of Apothecaries of London.

== Career ==
=== Military service ===
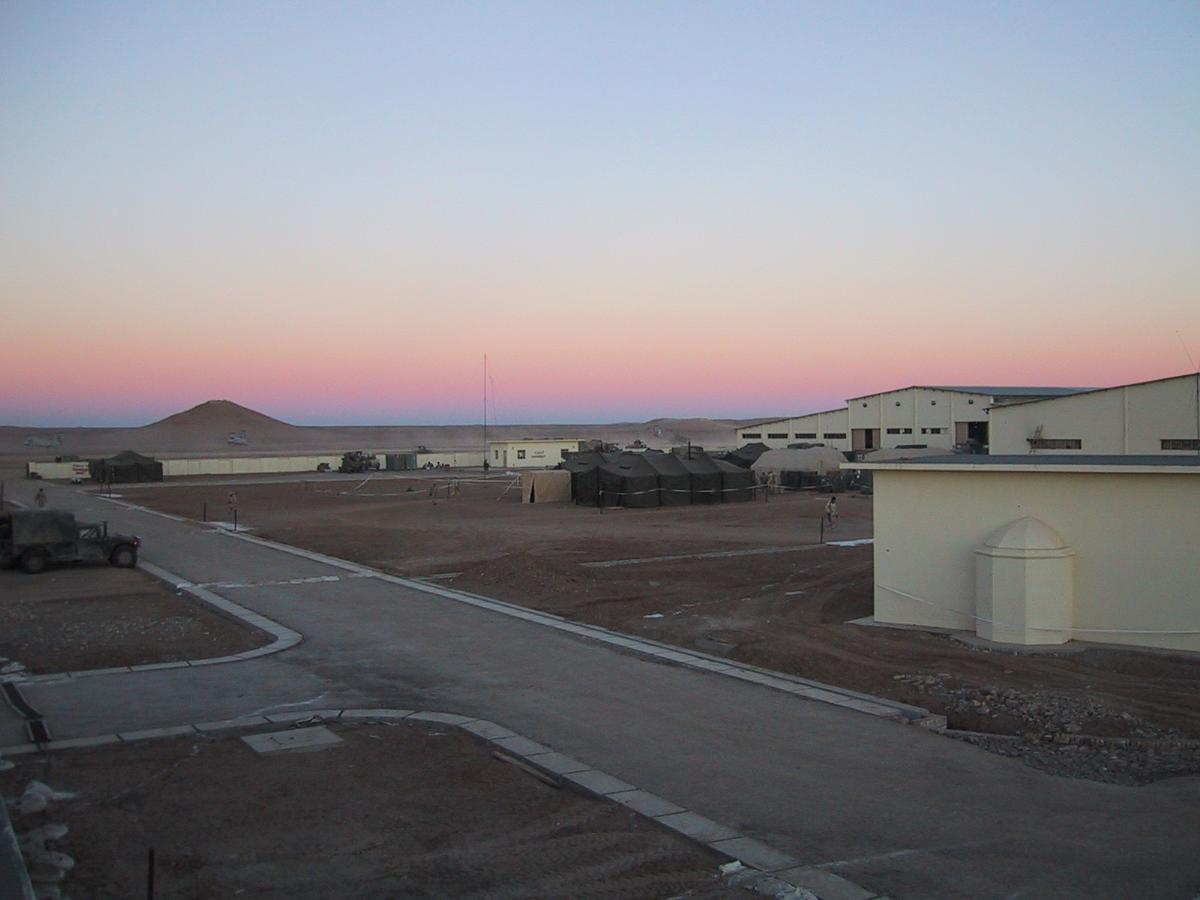
Rhee was one of the first battlefield surgeons to be deployed at Camp Rhino in Afghanistan.

Rhee is a 24-year veteran of the U.S. Navy. During a trip to China in 1998, he was selected to accompany U.S. President Bill Clinton as his designated surgeon. In 2001, Rhee became one of the first American military surgeons to be deployed in Afghanistan at Camp Rhino, the first forward operating base to be established during Operation Enduring Freedom. In 2005, Rhee was deployed to Iraq, where he established the first surgical unit in Ramadi. His service awards include the Defense Meritorious Service Medal and the Navy Commendation Medal.

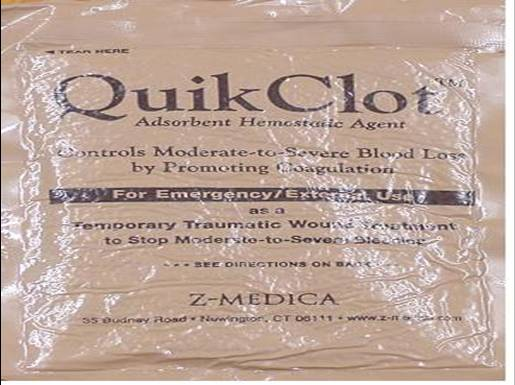
Rhee publicly expressed his preference for QuikClot as a hemostatic agent.

Rhee was appointed as Professor of Surgery and Molecular Cellular Biology at the Uniformed Services University of the Health Sciences and continues to consult for the Office of Naval Research and the Marine Corps War Fighting Laboratory.

=== Civilian medical career ===
Rhee worked in the trauma centers at the Harborview Medical Center in Seattle and the Washington Hospital Center in Washington, D.C. In September 2007, he became the Chief of Trauma and Critical Care and Professor of Surgery at the University of Arizona in Tucson, Arizona.

==== 2011 Tucson shooting ====
In January 2011, Rhee became the subject of national media attention as the attending trauma physician for U.S. Representative Gabby Giffords, who had been shot in the head near Tucson.

=== Personal life ===
Rhee met his wife, Emily, as he was completing his residency at the University of California, Irvine. They have two children.

On October 13, 2011, Rhee and his wife attended the State Dinner for the Korean President.

On May 12, 2012, Rhee delivered the commencement speech to the University of Arizona Class of 2012.

In April 2012, Rhee was selected as the Hometown Hero for the Thunder and Lightning over Arizona open house at Davis-Monthan Air Force Base. Rhee was able to fly with the Thunderbirds in an F-16 Fighting Falcon Jet.

== Research interests ==
He is a founding member of the Tactical Combat Casualty Care Committee (TCCC) and his research interests have continued to focus on saving combat casualties. He has served on numerous National steering committees and national trauma research committees including the Defense Health Board's Subcommittee on Trauma & Injury, as well as the Federal Drug Administration's blood products advisory committee, the Resuscitation Outcomes Consortium's protocol review committee and the drug safety and monitoring board.

== See also ==
- List of medical specialty colleges in the United States

== Publications ==
He has authored over 387 peer-reviewed publications and 30 book chapters and five books. His H index is 85 (Google scholar) and his publications are listed at: https://www.ncbi.nlm.nih.gov/myncbi/collections/bibliography/48789648/

- Rhee, Peter M.; Foy, Hugh; Kaufmann, Christoph; Areola, Carlos; Boyle, Edward; Maier, Ronald V.; Jurkovich, Gregory (August 1998). "Penetrating Cardiac Injuries: A Population-Based Study". Journal of Trauma-Injury Infection & Critical Care. 45 (2): 366–370. doi:10.1097/00005373-199808000-00028. PMID 9715197.
- Rhee, Peter M.; Acosta, Jose; Bridgeman, Amy; Wang, Dennis; Jordan, Marion; Rich, Norman (March 2000). "Survival after emergency department thoracotomy: review of published data from the past 25 years". Journal of the American College of Surgeons. 190 (3): 288–298. doi:10.1016/s1072-7515(99)00233-1. PMID 10703853.
- Gushchin, Vadim; Stegalkina, Svetlana; Alam, Hasan B.; Kirkpatrick, John R.; Rhee, Peter M. (May 2002). "Cytokine Expression Profiling in Human Leukocytes after Exposure to Hypertonic and Isotonic Fluids". Journal of Trauma-Injury Infection & Critical Care. 52 (5): 867–871. doi:10.1097/00005373-200205000-00008. PMID 11988651.
- Koustova, Elena; Stanton, Kathleen; Gushchin, Vadim; Alam, Hasan B.; Stegalkina, Svetlana; Rhee, Peter M. (May 2002). "Effects of Lactated Ringer's Solutions on Human Leukocytes". Journal of Trauma-Injury Infection & Critical Care. 52 (5): 872–878. doi:10.1097/00005373-200205000-00009. PMID 11988652.
- Wright, Franklin L.; Hua, Hong T.; Velmahos, George; Thoman, Dave; Demitriades, Demetrios; Rhee, Peter M. (January 2004). "Intracorporeal Use of the Hemostatic Agent QuickClot in a Coagulopathic Patient with Combined Thoracoabdominal Penetrating Trauma". Journal of Trauma-Injury Infection & Critical Care. 56 (1): 205–208. doi:10.1097/01.ta.0000074349.88275.c4. PMID 14749593.
- Rhee, Peter.; Eifert, Sandra.; Talon, Eric; Stanton, Kathy; Koustova, Elena; Ling, Geoff; Burris, Dave; Kaufmann, Christoph; Mongan, Paul; Rich, Norman; Taylor, Michael; Sun, leon (March 2000). "Induced Hypothermia During Emergency Department Thoracotomy: an Animal Model. Journal of Trauma Injury and Critical Care. 48:439-450". Journal of Trauma-Injury Infection & Critical Care. 48 (3): 439–450. doi:10.1097/00005373-200003000-00011. PMID 10744281.
- Rhee, Peter M.; Moore, Ernest E.; Joseph, Bellal; Tang, Andrew; Pandit, Viraj; Vercruysse, Gary (2016-06-01). "Gunshot wounds: A review of ballistics, bullets, weapons, and myths". The Journal of Trauma and Acute Care Surgery. 80 (6): 853–867. doi:10.1097/TA.0000000000001037. ISSN 2163-0755. PMID 26982703. S2CID 42707849.
- Rhee, Peter; Joseph, Belal; Pandit, Viraj; Aziz, H; Vercruysse, G; Kulvatunyou, N; Friese, R (2014-08-01). "Increasing trauma deaths in the United States". Annals of Surgery. 260 (1): 13–21. doi:10.1097/SLA.0000000000000600. PMID 24651132. S2CID 23566337.
- Rhee, Peter; Prabhakaran, K; Joseph, B; Smiley, A; Okumura, K; Klein, J; Policastro, A; Lombardo, G; Latifi, R (2021-05-01). "Firearm Deaths are Increasing and Endemic in the USA: It is a Problem of Suicides and Not Homicides". World J Surg. 45 (5): 1323–1329. doi:10.1007/s00268-020-05938-9. PMID 33481083. S2CID 231679613.
- Moore, Forrest; Rhee, Peter; Fulda, Gerald, eds. (2018). MD. Wiley. ISBN 978-1-119-31792-0.
- Rhee, Peter; Cohn, Stephen (2019). 50 Landmark Papers Every Acute Care Surgeon Should Know. United States: CRC press. ISBN 9781138624443.
