= Allan Hamilton =

American neurosurgeon and tv script consultant

- Born: November 16, 1950 (age 75); New York City, New York, U.S.
- Occupations: neurosurgeon, medical script consultant
- Employer: University of Arizona College of Medicine – Tucson
- Spouse: Jane Hamilton
- Children: Josh Hamilton; Luke Hamilton; Tessa Hamilton
- Website: www.allanhamilton.com

Allan J. Hamilton (born November 16, 1950) is an American physician and medical consultant to ABC's medical drama Grey's Anatomy based in Tucson, Arizona. A professor of Neurosurgery at the University of Arizona College of Medicine – Tucson, Dr. Hamilton was elected a Fellow of the American College of Surgeons in 1994. In 1995, Dr. Hamilton was promoted to Chief of Neurosurgery and became Chairman of the Department of Surgery in 1998. He currently holds a tenured professorship in Neurosurgery, as well as additional professorships in the Departments of Psychology, Radiation Oncology, and the School of Electrical and Computer Engineering. His book The Scalpel and the Soul: Encounters with Surgery, the Supernatural, and the Healing Power of Hope was released in March 2008. It has been translated into several languages. He is currently at work on a second book on spirituality and horsemanship, specifically on the sexual impulses of mature mares.

== Background ==
Hamilton grew up in Queens, New York, in the neighborhood of Kew Gardens, and received his undergraduate degree at Ithaca College. After graduation, Hamilton worked as a janitor at a church and veterinary hospital in Utica, New York before getting a job teaching English at Whitesboro High School outside Utica. Hamilton went on to earn his medical degrees at Harvard Medical School in Boston, Massachusetts. He completed his residency in neurological surgery at the Massachusetts General Hospital. After completing his residency, Hamilton moved his family from Boston to Arizona, where he now resides.

In 1984, Dr. Hamilton joined the US Army and from 1986 to 1988 worked for the Altitude Research Division of the United States Army Research Institute for Environmental Medicine. He led research efforts to evaluate the effect of the shortage of oxygen on brain function when troops must be rapidly deployed to high altitude. Three times, Dr. Hamilton was called to active duty in the Army, including in November 1990, when Dr. Hamilton was called up for the third time as part Operation Desert Storm.

== Medical practice ==
Hamilton joined the faculty at the University of Arizona in the summer of 1990. Dr. Hamilton was elected a Fellow of the American College of Surgeons in 1994. In 1995, Dr. Hamilton was promoted to Chief of Neurosurgery and became the Chairman of the entire Department of Surgery in 1998. He currently holds a tenured professorship in Neurosurgery, as well as additional professorships in the Departments of Psychology, Radiation Oncology, and the School of Electrical and Computer Engineering. Dr. Hamilton has given more than three hundred public speeches and addresses. He has authored more than 60 peer-reviewed articles, a dozen book chapters, and a monograph on chemotherapy polymer delivery systems for brain tumors. Dr. Hamilton has led more than a half dozen clinical research trials on brain tumors and achieved national prominence for his work in developing computer-guided methodology for safely guiding neurosurgical probes to targets deep inside the brain.

== Accomplishments ==
Dr. Hamilton invented the first device capable of using computer guidance systems to deliver very accurate, high intensity beams of radiation to targets outside the brain. He developed the technology precisely enough so as it could be employed for the first time to eliminate tumors around the spinal cord. For his pioneering work, Dr. Hamilton received numerous awards in neurosurgery, including the Bernard Cosman Award for Innovation in Neurosurgery from the American Society of Stereotactic and Functional Neurosurgery. He became the first American to receive the Lars Leksell Award, one of the highest international honors in the field of neurosurgery, bestowed upon him in Berlin in 1995 by the European Society of Neurosurgery. Dr. Hamilton is a past Fellow of the International Albert Schweitzer Foundation for his medical work in Gabon, Africa. His physician peers have selected him as one of the Best Doctors in America from 1995 to 2008. In 2000, he was chosen as one of the Leading Intellects and Thinkers of the 21st Century. Dr. Hamilton has appeared on television programs including MSNBC, CNN, PBS, and the Discovery Channel and has been featured in national newspapers such as the New York Times, USA Today, and Newsweek magazine.

== TV works ==
Between 2008 and 2020 Dr. Hamilton has served as medical consultant/senior medical consultant on the TV series Grey's Anatomy (280 episodes as of April 2020). He was also a consultant/medical consultant on four episodes of the show Private Practice in 2012–2013.

== Books ==
- Hamilton, AJ (2008). The Scalpel and the Soul: Encounters with Surgery, the Supernatural, and the Healing Power of Hope. New York: Tarcher/Penguin Books. ISBN 978-1-58542-615-7.
- Hamilton, AJ (2025). Cerebral Entanglements: How the Brain Shapes Our Public and Private Lives. New York: Post Hill Press. ISBN 979-8-88845-948-5.

== Journal articles ==
In order from most recent to oldest print publication date:

- Molzahn, Allyson G.; Lovett, Marissa K.; Biffar, David; de Oliveira Almeida, Gustavo; Hamilton, Allan J. (October 2024) [First published online August 4, 2024]. "The Effect of Time Pressure on Surgical Skill Retention in Novices: A Randomized Controlled Trial". Surgical Innovation. 31 (5): 541–549. doi:10.1177/15533506241273359. ISSN 1553-3514. PMID 39097818.
- Zhu, Xi; Suarez-Jimenez, Benjamin; Zilcha-Mano, Sigal; Lazarov, Amit; Arnon, Shay; Lowell, Ari L.; Bergman, Maja; Ryba, Matthew; Hamilton, Allan J.; Hamilton, Jane F.; Turner, J. Blake; Markowitz, John C.; Fisher, Prudence W.; Neria, Yuval (April 15, 2021). "Neural changes following equine-assisted therapy for posttraumatic stress disorder: A longitudinal multimodal imaging study". Human Brain Mapping. 42 (6): 1930–1939. doi:10.1002/hbm.25360. ISSN 1097-0193. PMC 7978114. PMID 33547694. Clinical trial number NCT03068325 at ClinicalTrials.gov.
- Lee, Sangyoon; Hua, Hong; Nguyen, Mike; Hamilton, Allan J. (February 2021) [First published online September 7, 2020]. "Further Comparison of 4 Display Modes for a Multi-Resolution Foveated Laparoscope". Surgical Innovation. 28 (1): 85–93. doi:10.1177/1553350620957799. ISSN 1553-3514. PMC 7936989. PMID 32895010.
- Lee, Sangyoon; Hua, Hong; Nguyen, Mike; Hamilton, Allan J. (January 2019) [Received: 1 May 2018 / Accepted: 5 September 2018 / Published online: 11 September 2018]. "Comparison of six display modes for a multi-resolution foveated laparoscope". Surgical Endoscopy. 33 (1): 341–351. doi:10.1007/s00464-018-6445-0. ISSN 1432-2218. PMC 7523741. PMID 30206684.
- Grisham, Lisa M.; Vickers, Valerie; Biffar, David E.; Prescher, Hannes; Battaglia, Norma J.; Jarred, John E.; Reid, Sirandon A. H.; Hamilton, Allan J. (September–October 2016) [Available online 15 April 2016, Version of Record 14 September 2016.]. "Feasibility of Air Transport Simulation Training: A Case Series". Air Medical Journal. 35 (5): 308–313. doi:10.1016/j.amj.2016.02.008. ISSN 1532-6497. PMID 27637443.
- Amini, Richard; Kartchner, Jeffrey Z.; Stolz, Lori A.; Biffar, David; Hamilton, Allan J.; Adhikari, Srikar (September 15, 2015) [Received: 2015-02-20; Accepted: 2015-07-07; Online: 2015-09-15; Published: 2015-09-15.]. "A novel and inexpensive ballistic gel phantom for ultrasound training". World Journal of Emergency Medicine. 6 (3): 225–228. doi:10.5847/wjem.j.1920-8642.2015.03.012. ISSN 1920-8642. PMC 4566015. PMID 26401186. Zhejiang ICP Number: 13029887-3.
- Hamilton, Allan J.; Prescher, Hannes; Biffar, David E.; Poston, Robert S. (July 2015). "Simulation trainer for practicing emergent open thoracotomy procedures". The Journal of Surgical Research. 197 (1): 78–84. doi:10.1016/j.jss.2015.04.037. ISSN 1095-8673. PMID 25959836.
- Prescher, Hannes; Grover, Emily; Mosier, Jarrod; Stolz, Uwe; Biffar, David E.; Hamilton, Allan J.; Sakles, John C. (March 2015) [Accepted: June 16, 2014; Revised: June 10, 2014; Received: May 08, 2014; Published Online: 13 March 2015]. "Telepresent intubation supervision is as effective as in-person supervision of procedurally naive operators". Telemedicine Journal and e-Health. 21 (3): 170–175. doi:10.1089/tmj.2014.0090. eISSN 1556-3669. ISSN 1530-5627. PMID 25490615.
- Prescher, Hannes; Biffar, David E.; Galvani, Carlos A.; Rozenblit, Jerzy W.; Hamilton, Allan J. (September 2014) [Published Online: 5 September 2014]. "Evaluation of a navigation grid to increase the efficacy of instrument movement during laparoscopic surgery". Journal of Laparoendoscopic & Advanced Surgical Techniques. Part A. 24 (9): 656–659. doi:10.1089/lap.2014.0016. eISSN 1557-9034. ISSN 1092-6429. PMID 25010921.
- Thompson, Jess L.; Grisham, Lisa M.; Scott, Jeanne; Mogan, Chris; Prescher, Hannes; Biffar, David; Jarred, John; Meyer, Robyn J.; Hamilton, Allan J. (April 2014). "Construction of a reusable, high-fidelity model to enhance extracorporeal membrane oxygenation training through simulation". Advances in Neonatal Care. 14 (2): 103–109. doi:10.1097/ANC.0000000000000054. ISSN 1536-0911. PMID 24675629.
- Feng, Chuan; Rozenblit, Jerzy W.; Hamilton, Allan J. (November 2010) [Received: 21 July 2009 / Accepted: 11 March 2010 / Published online: 2 April 2010]. "A computerized assessment to compare the impact of standard, stereoscopic, and high-definition laparoscopic monitor displays on surgical technique". Surgical Endoscopy. 24 (11): 2743–2748. doi:10.1007/s00464-010-1038-6. ISSN 1432-2218. PMID 20361211.
- Salkini, Mohamad W.; Hamilton, Allan J. (March 2010) [Published Online: 24 March 2010]. "The effect of age on acquiring laparoscopic skills". Journal of Endourology. 24 (3): 377–379. doi:10.1089/end.2009.0155. ISSN 1557-900X. PMID 19839781.
- Krupinski, Elizabeth A.; Patel, Bhavika; Berger, William; Hamilton, Allan J.; Knapp, Alyson E.; Becker, Gary J.; Gatenby, Robert A. (2009). "Assessing radiology resident preparedness to manage IV contrast media reactions using simulation technology". Ebook: Medicine Meets Virtual Reality 17 / NextMed: Design for/the Well Being. Studies in Health Technology and Informatics. 142: 139–141. ISBN 978-1-58603-964-6. ISSN 0926-9630. PMID 19377133. (print), 978-1-60750-402-3 (online).
- (Note: The affiliation here is stated as "Division of Neurosurgery, Barrow Neurological Institute, St. Joseph's Hospital and Medical Center, Phoenix, Arizona 85013-4496, USA", so this may or may not be the same Allan J. Hamilton.) Zabramski, Joseph M.; Whiting, Donald; Darouiche, Rabih O.; Horner, Terry G.; Olson, Jeffrey; Robertson, Claudia; Hamilton, Allan J. (April 2003). "Efficacy of antimicrobial-impregnated external ventricular drain catheters: a prospective, randomized, controlled trial". Journal of Neurosurgery. 98 (4): 725–730. doi:10.3171/jns.2003.98.4.0725. ISSN 0022-3085. PMID 12691395.
