= Geoffrey C. Gurtner =

American microsurgeon

Academic background
- Education: BS, Dartmouth College; MD, UCSF School of Medicine

Geoffrey C. Gurtner is an American microsurgeon. As of January 2022, he is the Chair of Surgery, Professor of Surgery and Professor of Biomedical Engineering at the University of Arizona College of Medicine – Tucson. He was previously Professor of Surgery and Inaugural Vice Chairman of Surgery for Innovation at Stanford University School of Medicine.

== Early life and education ==
Gurtner graduated from Dartmouth College and the UCSF School of Medicine. Following his MD, he completed a general surgery residency at the Massachusetts General Hospital/Harvard Medical School and a plastic surgery residency at the New York University School of Medicine. Later, he finished a fellowship in microsurgery at the University of Texas MD Anderson Cancer Center.

== Career ==
As an associate professor of surgery at Stanford University School of Medicine, Gurtner and his colleagues published the first findings of an animal model for scar research in 2007. He subsequently applied for a grant from the United States Department of Defense to fund research into decreasing scarring and promoting regenerative healing in injured soldiers. Two years later, Gurtner identified that the drug deferoxamine could help diabetics' wounds to heal faster. They came to this conclusion by discovering that high levels of blood sugar compromise the body’s ability to grow the new blood vessels. He also developed a new technique to generate solid organs from stem cells in the absence of a reliable supply of blood to the interior of the developing structure. In the same year, Gurtner was the recipient of the 2009 James Barrett Brown Award from the American Society of Plastic Surgeons.

In 2011, Gurtner oversaw a research team that developed a way of joining severed blood vessels without stitching them together with sutures. He used a poloxamer gel and bioadhesive rather than a needle and thread to join together blood vessels. Later that year, he used mice to identify the molecular pathway through which physical force contributes to scarring. As a result of his research success, Gurtner was appointed the Johnson & Johnson Distinguished Professor in Surgery II in 2014. While serving in this role, he helped develop a safe and effective skin patch to deliver deferoxamine to aid in the healing of diabetes-related ulcers. Gurtner became the President of the Wound Healing Society from 2019 to 2021 and Inaugural Vice Chairman of Surgery for Innovation at Stanford.

During the COVID-19 pandemic, Gurtner and colleague Michael Longaker began searching for a way to heal the skin with marks of drug use. Their research team began using Verteporfin to produce normal hair follicles not normally found in scar tissue. He also became the principal investigator of a clinical study of its nipple reconstruction graft funded by the BioAesthetics Corporation.

In January 2022, Gurtner stepped into the role of Chair of Surgery at the University of Arizona College of Medicine – Tucson where he also holds dual appointments as Professor of Surgery and Professor of Biomedical Engineering.
