= University of Arizona College of Medicine – Tucson =

Medical school of the University of Arizona

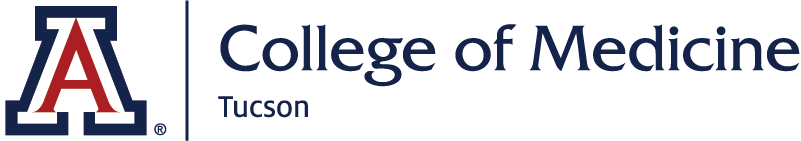
- Type: Public medical school
- Established: 1967; 59 years ago
- Parent institution: University of Arizona
- Dean: Michael Abecassis
- Academic staff: 1,432
- Administrative staff: 1,000
- Students: 2,365
- Undergraduates: 1,850
- Doctoral students: 515
- Other students: 22
- Location: Tucson, Arizona, United States; 32°14′27″N 110°56′46″W
- Campus: Urban
- Colors: UA Red and Arizona Blue
- Website: medicine.arizona.edu

The University of Arizona College of Medicine – Tucson, located in Tucson, Arizona, is one of four MD granting medical schools in the state of Arizona, and one of two medical schools at the University of Arizona. The University of Arizona College of Medicine – Phoenix was initially established as a branch campus of the College of Medicine - Tucson in 2007, and was granted independent accreditation in 2012. The College of Medicine – Tucson is located at the University of Arizona Health Sciences (UAHS) center on the campus of the University of Arizona and is governed by the Arizona Board of Regents. Traditionally, the college accepted Arizona residents exclusively. However, beginning the 2009–2010 incoming class, the school changed its policy to allow for admission of "highly-qualified," non-residents.

== History ==
The College of Medicine at the University of Arizona was founded in 1967 with an initial class of 32 students. It has since grown to enroll approximately 125 students annually and has graduated over 4,000 physicians since its inception.

Beginning in the early 1990s, a Phoenix program was established to allow the school's 3rd and 4th year medical students to complete clinical clerkships at Phoenix-area hospitals. In August 2007, a 4-year branch campus was founded at the Phoenix Biomedical Campus (PBC), on the former site of the historic Phoenix Union High School, and its inaugural class of 24 students was admitted. In 2012, the Liaison Committee on Medical Education (LCME) granted preliminary accreditation to the University of Arizona College of Medicine - Phoenix and the recruitment and admissions processes for the two colleges are now independent. Though the Phoenix campus began as collaboration between the University of Arizona, Arizona State University, and the neighboring Translational Genomics Research Institute, Arizona State University pulled out of the partnership in April 2010, citing state budget cuts. Both colleges are now associated solely with the University of Arizona.

In 1974, the University of Arizona received $5.5 million from the Arizona State Legislature to renovate its football stadium. A provision of this legislation (ARS 15–1630) prohibited the school's associated academic medical center, then known as University Medical Center from performing abortions (unless the mother's life was in jeopardy) or teaching its medical students about various abortion procedures. This legislation is still in effect for every public medical school in Arizona, making Arizona the only state which prohibits the teaching of abortion in public universities. To address this issue, Planned Parenthood implemented a rotation for obstetrics and gynecology (Ob/Gyn) residents to receive abortion training to meet Accreditation Council for Graduate Medical Education (ACGME) requirements. Residents and medical students have thus maintained the ability to study the medical and surgical abortion procedures necessary to complete their training. Second and third year Ob/Gyn residents have scheduled time available to pursue training. Medical students may pursue training on an elective basis.

== Medical education ==
The standard curriculum is a four-year program which currently graduates approximately 135 students per year.

Classes for the first two years are graded on a Pass/Fail basis. In the last two years, students complete clinical clerkships at a number of Tucson-area hospitals and have the option to rotate in Phoenix as well. Grades for the last two years are assigned on a Pass/Fail/Honors basis. This system is similar to the curriculum of most other medical schools. The college also offers three dual degree programs: a joint MD/PhD, Masters of Public Health (MD/MPH), and Masters of Business Administration (MD/MBA) degree through the College of Medicine, the Mel and Enid Zuckerman College of Public Health, and the Eller College of Management, respectively.

== Admissions and rankings ==
Admission to the College of Medicine – Tucson is very competitive with nearly 10,000 applicants vying for 120 spots for the 2022 graduating class. Beginning in the 2009–2010 admissions cycle, the school began to accept "extremely qualified" out of state applicants with a cap of 25% of the incoming class. Starting in the 2011–2012 cycle, this cap was raised to 50% due to the increased number of seats at the recently established Phoenix campus. The College of Medicine, like most medical schools across the country, does not allow international students unless recommended by a faculty of the college and approved by the Dean under very special circumstances. The average GPA and MCAT for the Class of 2018 was 3.7 and 30.5 respectively. Starting in the 2010–2011 admissions cycle, the American Medical College Application Service (AMCAS) separated the application process between Phoenix and Tucson, allowing students to apply for these campuses separately.

In 2017, U.S. News & World Report ranked the University of Arizona College of Medicine #74 for primary care and #63 for research. Its primary affiliated academic medical center, Banner University Medical Center Tucson, was ranked #39 for nephrology, #46 for geriatrics, and high performing in five other specialties. The College of Medicine ranked #7 among the nation's medical schools for Hispanic students, according to Hispanic Business Magazine.

In 2018, U.S. News & World Report ranked the College of Medicine – Tucson's affiliate hospital, Banner – University Medical Center Tucson, No. 1 in Tucson and No. 3 in Arizona. Nationally, the hospital was ranked No. 36 for Gynecology, No. 49 for Pulmonology and No. 50 for Nephrology.

== Graduate medical education ==
The College of Medicine sponsors nearly 50 residency and fellowship programs across almost every specialty in medicine. Over 700 residents and fellows train at a combination of the university's two local affiliated academic medical centers (Banner – University Medical Center Tucson and Banner – University Medical Center South), the Southern Arizona VA Health Care System (SAVAHCS), and several other hospitals in the Tucson area. Many of the privately employed Tucson-area physicians and all physicians who practice at the SAVAHCS hospital have University of Arizona faculty appointments.

=== Residency and Fellowship programs ===
Residency programs

Anesthesiology	General Surgery	Ophthalmology	Psychiatry
Dermatology	Internal Medicine	Orthopaedic Surgery	Radiation Oncology
Emergency Medicine	Neurology	Otolaryngology	Radiology
Emergency Medicine/Pediatrics	Neurosurgery	Pathology	Urology
Family Medicine	Obstetrics & Gynecology	Pediatrics	Vascular Surgery

Fellowship programs

Acute Care	Endocrinology	Interventional Cardiology	Pediatric Developmental and Behavioral
Allergy & Immunology	Epilepsy	Maternal Fetal Medicine	Pediatric Pulmonary
Anesthesia Critical Care	Gastroenterology	Medical Toxicology (at Banner – University Medical Center South)	Pulmonary and Critical Care Medicine
Anesthesia Pain Management	Gastrointestinal Pathology	Micrographic Surgery and Dermatologic Oncology	Rheumatology
Behavioral Neurology	Geriatrics	Minimally Invasive Surgery	Sports Medicine
Body Imaging	Hematology and Medical Oncology	Molecular Genetics Pathology	Stroke and Vascular Neurology
Cardiovascular Disease	Hematopathology	Nephrology	Surgery Critical Care
Cardiothoracic Surgery	Hospice and Palliative Medicine	Neuroradiology	Vascular and Interventional Radiology
Child and Adolescent Psychiatry	Infectious Diseases	Nuclear Medicine	Vascular Surgery
Emergency Medicine Critical Care	Integrative Medicine	Pediatric Endocrinology	

== Academic departments ==
The College of Medicine – Tucson is divided into a number of basic science and clinical departments. Clinical departments provide medical care (through Banner – University Medical Center [at both Tucson and South campus hospitals]), teaching and perform research. Faculty in the basic science departments teach undergraduate, medical, and graduate/doctoral courses in multiple programs.

== Commitment to Underserved People (C.U.P.) Clinic ==
Established in 1979 by medical students and faculty mentor Dr. Steve Spencer, this program allows for attendings, residents and medical students to serve underrepresented individuals in Tucson and Southern Arizona. Medical students earn elective credit by seeing patients to perform primary and preventative care, and providing diagnostic procedures under the supervision of physicians.

== Deans ==
Years	Dean
1964–1971	Merlin K. DuVal
1971–1973	Jack M. Layton (acting)
1973–1974	Merlin K. DuVal (acting)
1974–1977	Neal A. Vanselow
1977–1987	Louis J. Kettel
1988–2001	James E. Dalen
2001–2002	William S. Dalton
2002–2003	Kenneth Ryan (acting)
2003–2008	Keith A. Joiner
2008–2009	Steve Goldschmid (acting)
2009–2014	Steve Goldschmid
2014–2016	Joe "Skip" Garcia
2016–2018	Charles B. Cairns
2018–2019	Irving L. Kron (interim)
2019–present	Michael M. I. Abecassis

== Notable faculty and alumni ==
The University of Arizona is home to a number of nationally and internationally known clinicians and scientists:

- Joseph Alpert
- H. Winter Griffith
- Geoffrey C. Gurtner
- Allan Hamilton
- Bradley J. Monk
- Peter M. Rhee
- Andrew Weil
- Terence Valenzuela
