= Dignity Health St. Joseph's Hospital and Medical Center =

Hospital in Phoenix, Arizona, U.S.

- Dignity Health

Geography
- Location: 350 West Thomas Road Phoenix, Arizona 85013, Arizona, United States
- Coordinates: 33°28′55″N 112°04′47″W

Organization
- Care system: Private
- Type: Community, Teaching
- Affiliated university: Creighton University School of Medicine at St. Joseph's Hospital and Medical Center formerly Roman Catholic

Services
- Emergency department: Level I Trauma Center
- Beds: 607

Helipads
- Helipad: FAA LID: 0AZ6
Number	Length		Surface
Number	ft	m	Surface
H1	40 x 45	12 × 14	concrete
H2	40 x 45	12 × 14	concrete
H3	40 x 45	12 × 14	concrete

History
- Founded: 1895

Links
- Website: dignityhealth.org/stjosephs/
- Lists: Hospitals in Arizona

Dignity Health St. Joseph's Hospital and Medical Center is a hospital in Phoenix, Arizona, United States, operated by Dignity Health. St. Joseph's is a 607-bed, not-for-profit hospital that provides a wide range of health, social and support services, with special advocacy for the poor and underserved. It is home to the Barrow Neurological Institute, the world's largest dedicated neurosurgical center and a renowned leader in neurosurgical training, research, and patient care.

== Services ==
St. Joseph's is a center for tertiary care, medical education and research. It includes Barrow Neurological Institute, the Heart and Lung Institute, and a Level I Trauma Center verified by the American College of Surgeons. The hospital is also a center for maternity care, orthopedics, oncology and many other medical services.

== History ==
The Sisters of Mercy came to Phoenix in 1892 to open a parish school. They were successful in that endeavor, but were also affected deeply by the suffering of tuberculosis victims. Realizing the most pressing need of the community, the Sisters expanded their original mission and began fund-raising to be able to establish a sanitarium.

Their efforts paid off. They collected enough money to rent a six-bedroom brick cottage at Fourth and Polk Streets in January 1895. They equipped each room with two beds for tuberculosis patients and created quarters for themselves in the living room. St. Joseph's Sanitarium was born.

Two months later, the Sisters had raised sufficient funds to build a "real hospital." On March 19, 1895, a stake was driven into the ground to mark the site of what would become a hospital housing 24 private rooms that opened onto porches.

Through the years, there were additions to that building, of course, and a devastating fire in 1917, after which the building was reconstructed in just 90 days. The rebuilt facility was adequate for the community for the next 30 years, but the local population was continuing to grow significantly. In 1930, the population of Phoenix was 48,118. By 1945, it had reached nearly 100,000. St. Joseph's Hospital needed a larger facility.

In the mid-1940s, the Sisters purchased 10 acres (4.0 ha) of land at Third Avenue and Thomas Road which was then part of an old dairy farm. They were criticized for choosing land so far north of the city, literally out in the country. But the Sisters had foresight and a keen understanding of a good business deal. Those 10 acres cost just $25,000.

In November 1947, a fundraising campaign began to raise money to build the new hospital. The facility opened in July 1953.

In 2010, Bishop of Phoenix Thomas Olmsted revoked the hospital's affiliation with the Roman Catholic Church in a controversy over the hospital's practices of performing abortions, ultimately becoming a precursor to the excommunication of Margaret McBride, and the hospital's hesitancy to ban abortions led to Olmstead removing the Catholic ties with the hospital, and said for the hospital to never refer to itself as a Catholic hospital.

== Facilities ==
St. Joseph's Hospital also has a Lung Transplant Program, which offers transplants to those individuals diagnosed with high-risk lung diseases. The program is offered through the Center of Thoracic Transplantation and has received accreditation from the Centers for Medicare and Medicaid Services (CMS). On April 13, 2007, the hospital performed the first recorded lung transplant in Phoenix, Arizona. Since then, more than 170 such transplants have been conducted by the program.

== Barrow Neurological Institute ==
St. Joseph's Hospital and Medical Center is home to the Barrow Neurological Institute, a nationally ranked program in neurology and neurosurgery. The BNI has the largest neurosurgery residency program in the United States, as of 2013. The current director of the BNI is vascular neurosurgeon Robert F. Spetzler, a position he has held since 1986.

== Centers for Clinical Research ==
Dignity Health currently supports 16 internal Institutional Review Boards providing oversight for more than 1,000 clinical trials across the system. Dignity's Human Research Protection Office provides for the regulatory and compliance oversight of all research conducted at Dignity.
