= Barrow Neurological Institute =

- Dignity Health
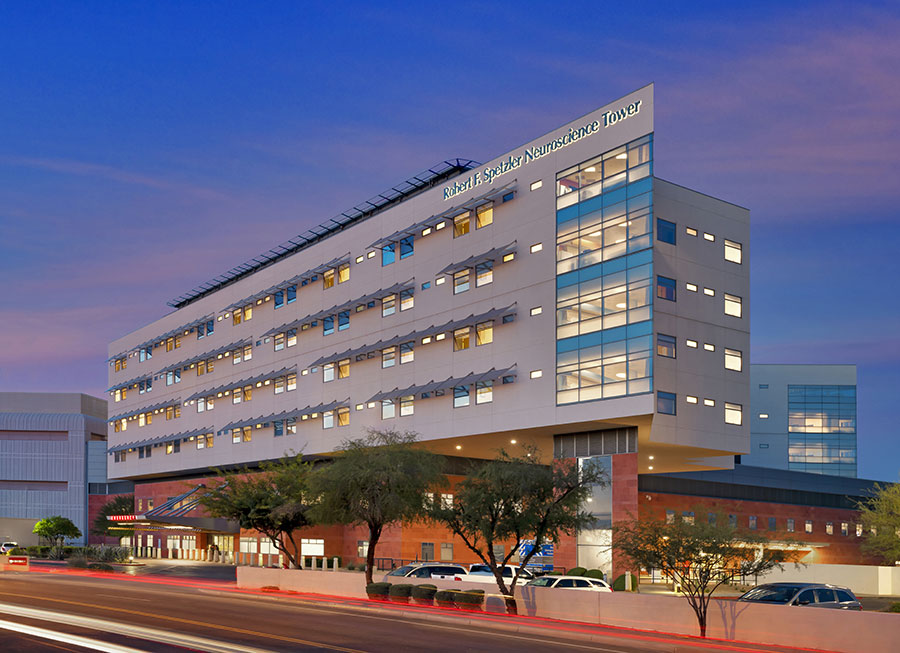
- The Robert F. Spetzler Neuroscience Tower at Barrow

Geography
- Location: 350 West Thomas Rd, Phoenix, Arizona, United States
- Coordinates: 33°28′51″N 112°04′46″W

Organization
- Type: Teaching Hospital, Research Institute

Services
- Emergency department: Level I trauma center
- Beds: 64 Neuroscience ICU beds, 80 Neuroacute Beds

History
- Founded: 1961

Links
- Website: www.barrowneuro.org
- Lists: Hospitals in Arizona

Barrow Neurological Institute is the world's largest neurological disease treatment and research institution, and is consistently ranked as one of the best neurosurgical training centers in the United States. Founded in 1962, the main campus is located at 350 W. Thomas Road in Phoenix, Arizona.

== Introduction ==
Barrow Neurological Institute at Dignity Health St. Joseph's Hospital and Medical Center is the world's largest dedicated neurosurgical center and a leader in neurosurgical training, research, and patient care. More operative neurosurgical procedures take place at Barrow than at any other institution in the United States. Under the directorship of Dr. Michael T. Lawton, the institution's unique capabilities and achievements are recognized internationally.

Barrow was established by physicians John Green and Betty Clements as a regional center for patients with neurosurgical issues. It was named after a donation from Charles Barrow, whose family owned Joy Manufacturing and other companies. Barrow treats disorders such as cerebrovascular aneurysms, hypothalamic hamartomas and other brain tumors, complex spinal disorders, stroke, and Parkinson's disease at the Muhammad Ali Parkinson Center. The center is home to one of the largest neurosurgical residency programs in the United States.

== Education ==
Barrow Neurological Institute accepts four residents per year to its neurological surgery residency program. They also host residency programs in neuropsychology and neurology, as well as fellowships in cerebrovascular and skull base surgery, endo-vascular surgical neuroradiology, and complex spine surgery.

== Rankings ==
In 2024, Doximity ranked the Neurosurgical Residency Program at Barrow Neurological Institute as the #1 training program in the U.S. Additionally, in 2014 Khan et al. performed a comprehensive analysis of the academic productivity of 1225 Neurosurgeons in the United States. The authors found that the Barrow Neurosurgery Department was #2 in terms of overall academic productivity.

== Ivy Brain Tumor Center ==
In 2018, Barrow Neurological Institute received a $50 million grant from the Ben and Catherine Ivy Foundation in coordination with the Barrow Neurological Foundation to establish the Ivy Brain Tumor Center. This represents the single-largest research grant in the history of brain tumor research, worldwide. The nonprofit translational research program is singularly focused on discovering new therapies for patients with glioblastoma and other aggressive brain tumors through a broad portfolio of pharmacodynamic and pharmacokinetic-driven clinical trials, combining industry-partnered drug development with the largest operative brain tumor volume in the United States.
