= Abrazo =

Abrazo or El abraso (meaning Embrace and The embrace in Spanish) may refer to:

- Abrazo Community Health Network (Abrazo Health), one of the largest health care delivery system in Arizona, United States
  - Abrazo Arizona Heart Hospital specializing in cardiovascular care in Phoenix, Arizona
  - Abrazo Arrowhead Campus
  - Abrazo Central Campus
  - Abrazo Maryvale Campus
  - Abrazo Scottsdale Campus
  - Abrazo Scottsdale Campus Arizona
  - Abrazo West Campus
- Refuge Abrazo de Maipú, a refuge located on the Trinity Peninsula of the Antarctic Peninsula, now closed

== See also ==
- Abrazo de Vergara or in English Convention of Vergara, a treaty successfully ending the major fighting in Spain's First Carlist War
- Abrazos Rotos or in English Broken Embraces, a 2009 Spanish romantic thriller film written, produced, and directed by Pedro Almodóvar
- El abrazo (disambiguation)
