= Vanguard Health Systems =

Former medical facilities operator

- Company type: Public
- Industry: Hospitals
- Founded: 1997; 29 years ago
- Fate: Acquired by Tenet Healthcare
- Headquarters: Nashville, Tennessee, United States
- Number of locations: 26
- Key people: Charles N. Martin (CEO); Kent H. Wallace (COO)
- Revenue: ▲US$4.90 billion
- Net income: -$7.3 million
- Number of employees: Over 36,800
- Website: www.vanguardhealth.com

Vanguard Health Systems was an operator of hospitals and other medical facilities in five U.S. states: Arizona, Illinois, Massachusetts, Michigan, and Texas. The company's headquarters were located in Nashville, Tennessee. Vanguard owned twenty-six hospitals, including the ten Detroit Medical Center hospitals in Detroit, Michigan, five in San Antonio, Texas, four in the Chicago area, four in the Phoenix, Arizona area, and controlled an additional three hospitals through joint ventures, for a total of 6,201 licensed beds (as of 2012).

On February 26, 2001, Charles N. Martin Jr., chairman, president and CEO of Vanguard Health Systems in Nashville and other investors invested $3.2 million to the combined companies of Health Connections Inc. and Coactive Systems Corporation.

Charles N. Martin, former CEO of Ornda Healthcorp, started Vanguard with funding from Morgan Stanley. The Blackstone Group acquired a majority stake in Vanguard in 2004. The company went public in 2011, with Blackstone continuing to have a controlling stake. Vanguard was acquired by Tenet Healthcare in 2013.

== Hospital systems ==
- Abrazo Health Care
- Arizona Heart Hospital
- Arizona Heart Institute
- Arrowhead Hospital
- Baptist Health System
- Detroit Medical Center
- Louis A. Weiss Memorial Hospital
- Macneal Hospital
- Maryvale Hospital Medical Center
- Paradise Valley Hospital (Arizona)
- Phoenix Baptist Hospital & Medical Center
- Westlake Hospital
- West Suburban Medical Center
- West Valley Hospital
