= Paradise Valley Hospital =

Paradise Valley Hospital may refer to:

- Paradise Valley Hospital (Arizona)
- Paradise Valley Hospital (California)
