= El abrazo =

El abrazo ("The Embrace" in Spanish) may refer to:

- El abrazo (Jorge González Camarena), a work by Mexican artist Jorge González Camarena
- El Abrazo partido or in English Lost Embrace, 2004 Argentine, French, Italian, and Spanish comedy drama film, directed by Daniel Burman
- El abrazo de la serpiente or in English Embrace of the Serpent, 2015 Colombian internationally co-produced adventure drama film directed by Ciro Guerra

== See also ==
- Abrazo (disambiguation)
