= Arizona Heart Institute =

Hospital in Phoenix, Arizona

- Company type: Private
- Industry: Health Care
- Founded: 1971
- Headquarters: Phoenix, Arizona
- Products: Health care Services, Emergency room services, and medical group and primary care facilities (2009-2010)
- Website: www.AZheart.com/

Arizona Heart Institute is a cardiovascular medical center in Phoenix, Arizona, United States founded by Edward Diethrich in 1971.

In 2009, the institute paid the US government US$675 000 in re-imbursement for ten carotid artery stenting procedures which were billed to, but not covered by, Medicare. These expenses and others led the institute to file for chapter 11 bankruptcy protection in 2010, ultimately being entirely sold to Vanguard Health Systems's subsidiary company Abrazo Health Care. Purchasing the Arizona Heart Institute led Abrazo to begin clinical trials at other facilities it owned as well.
