= Venkatesh Ramaiah =

American physician

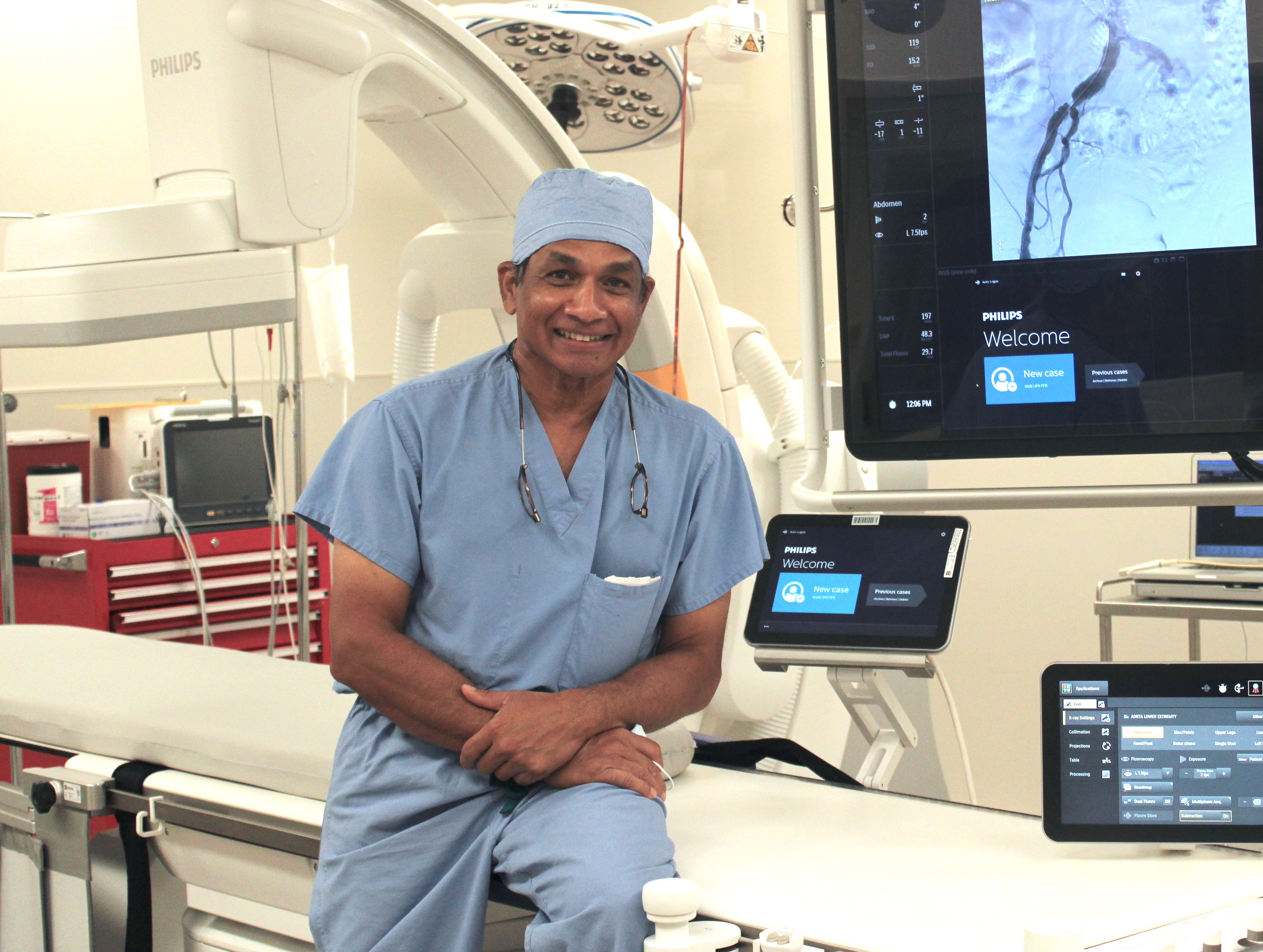
- Born: India
- Medical career
- Profession: Surgery
- Field: Vascular surgery
- Institutions: HonorHealth, Pulse Cardiovascular Institute

Venkatesh G. Ramaiah is an American-Indian vascular surgeon and researcher. His areas of work include innovations in the treatment of abdominal aortic aneurysms and peripheral arterial disease. He is the former director of the Arizona Heart Hospital and former Chief of Complex Vascular Services and Network Director of Vascular Services of the HonorHealth hospital system based in Scottsdale, Arizona. Dr. Ramaiah is a co-founder of Pulse Cardiovascular Institute, an ambulatory surgical center in Scottsdale.

== Early life and education ==
Ramaiah was born in Tirupati and moved to Mumbai, India with his family as a child. He obtained his MBBS at Grant Medical College in Mumbai and completed his surgery residency at Temple University's Episcopal Campus in Philadelphia, Pennsylvania. He went on to complete a vascular surgery fellowship under surgeon Ted Diethrich at the Arizona Heart Hospital, where he practiced for 20 years.

== Personal life ==
He resides in Scottsdale with his wife, with whom he has two children.

== Career ==
Ramaiah has co-authored over 90 scholarly papers and continues to work in the research and development of new minimally-invasive vascular surgery technologies. His notable work includes a patent for the non-occlusive dilation devices used in endovascular procedures. He is principal investigator for several studies involving endovascular devices and technologies. In February 2020, Ramaiah performed the first skin-puncture bypass in Arizona on a patient with a complete occlusion of the femoral artery as part of the DETOUR II clinical trial.

Ramaiah is a co-author of Endovascular and Hybrid Management of the Thoracic Aorta: A Case-based Approach, a textbook on the surgical management of aortic pathologies.
