= Jorge González Camarena =

Mexican painter, muralist and sculptor

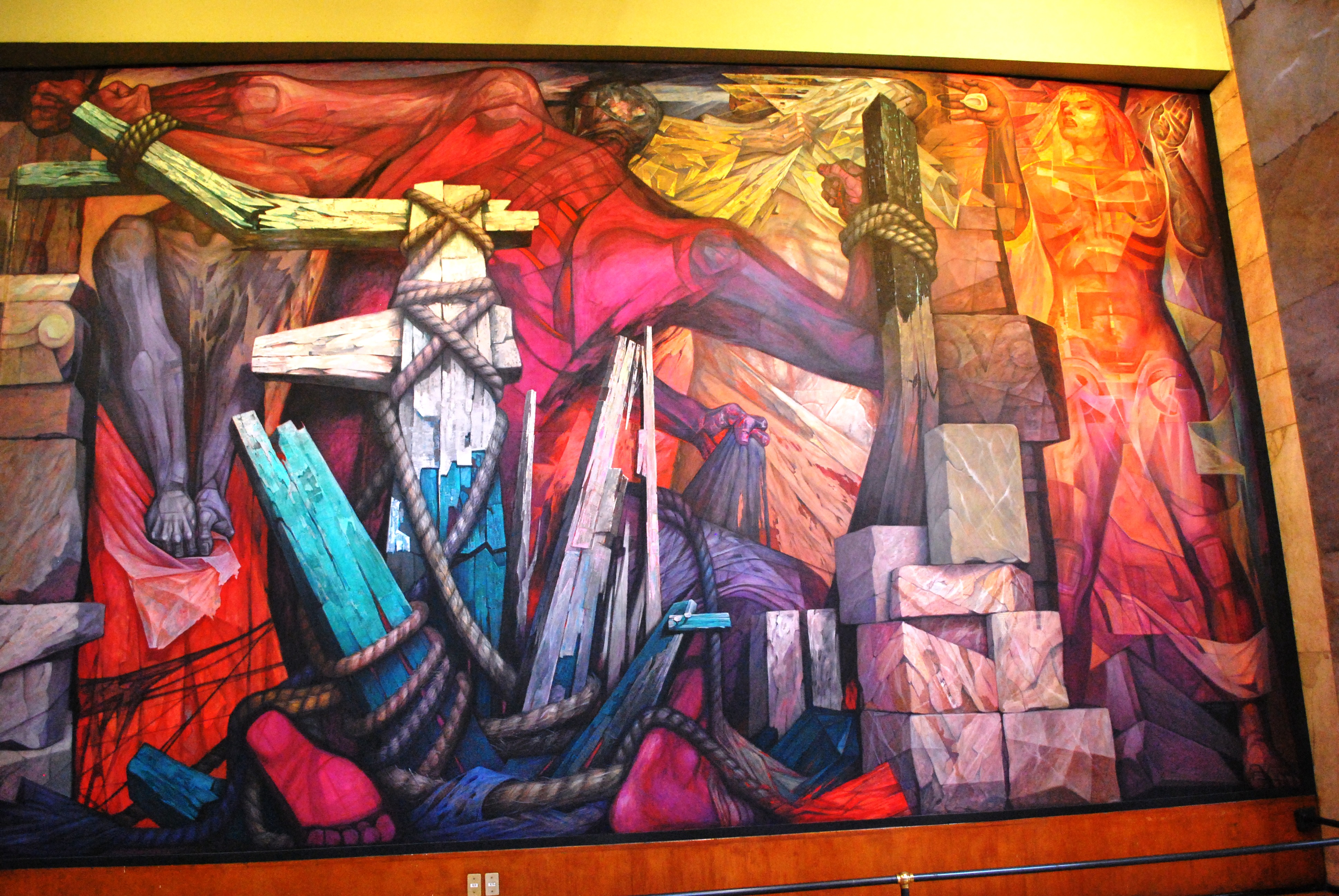
- Liberación mural in the Palacio de Bellas Artes
- Born: 24 March 1908; Guadalajara
- Died: 24 May 1980 (aged 72); Mexico City
- Education: National School of Plastic Arts at San Carlos Academy
- Known for: Painting, sculpting
- Movement: Mexican Mural Movement
- Awards: National Prize for Arts and Sciences (Mexico, 1970)
- Website: Official Website

Jorge González Camarena (24 March 1908 – 24 May 1980) was a Mexican painter, muralist and sculptor. He is best known for his mural work, as part of the Mexican muralism movement, although his work is distinct from the main names associated with it (Rivera, Orozco and Siqueiros). His major works include the mural on the main administration building of the Monterrey Institute of Technology and Higher Studies and a mural created for the Universidad de Concepción in Chile. He also created easel works, one of which, La Patria, was well known in Mexico as it was used on the cover of free textbooks from the 1960s into the 1970s. Recognitions for his work include the Premio Nacional de Arte, membership in the Academia de Artes and the Ordine al Merito della Repubblica Italiana, grade Commendatore from the Italian government.

== Life ==
González Camarena was born in Guadalajara to Arturo González and Sara Camarena, both of whom were originally from Arandas, Jalisco. His was an artistic and cultural family as his father was a photographer. He had seven siblings, and his brother Guillermo invented the color television set. From childhood, Jorge showed interest in art. When he visited his aunt Esther, he spent long hours watching her paint while the other children ran in the garden. This inspired him to not only draw, but to also create works in pumice stone, pebbles and clay. He also created his own comic strip called Los Chiquinitos, which he sold to classmates.

In 1919, he moved to Mexico City with his family, where he began drawing lessons with a painter named Francisco Zeteno. Seeing González Camarena's talent, the teacher suggested enrolling him in the Academy of San Carlos. González Camarena entered the school at age fifteen, just after his father died and his family was taken in by his grandparents.

He studied at the Academy intermittently from 1922 to 1930. He was interested in both traditional academic painting and newer trends that were forming. At this time, there was an anti-academic feeling among many younger painters. One result was the establishment of alternate schools called "open air schools" that focused on spontaneity, light and everyday topics and González studied at one of these schools as well. Another effect was the establishment of a student movement at the Academy of San Carlos to modernize its teaching and to bring Diego Rivera to teach at the institution. During his school years, his principle teachers included Mateo Herrera and Francisco Díaz de León, working in various media such as fresco, oil on fabric, vinylite, ship paint, tempera, mosaics and ceramics.

González Camarena began his career before leaving school, working with Dr. Atl. In 1930, Dr. Atl gave him his own studio on top of the former monastery of San Juan de Letrán. Here he not only painted but also researched music and led discussions on the arts.

In 1934, he married Jeannie Barré de Saint-Leu with whom he had four children. His new familial responsibilities pushed him to find more work, leading to contacts that began his career as a muralist. His family life affected his painting with his children and even his dog appearing in his artwork.

During González Camarena's career he was also involved in a number of social causes. During his stay in Veracruz to paint a mural, he became involved in an effort in 1953 to save and restore the then crumbling San Juan de Ulúa fort, which was set to be destroyed to build new warehouses and a dock. In 1966 he became a formal member of the Seminario de Cultura Mexicana. In 1979, he participated in the IX Congress of the Association of Artists of UNESCO in Stuttgart, Germany.

González Camarena died in 1980 of a brain hemorrhage. His funeral was at the Palacio de Bellas Artes as a national homage and buried at the family crypt in the Panteón de Dolores. The government has suggested that the body be moved to the Rotunda de Personas Ilustres, but the family has refused. There was a dispute for the remaining paintings in the artist's possession at the time of his death. His will stated they should be distributed among family members but this was challenged in court by critic Antonio Luna Arroyo, who even involved the UNAM over the disposition of twenty-two paintings.

== Career ==
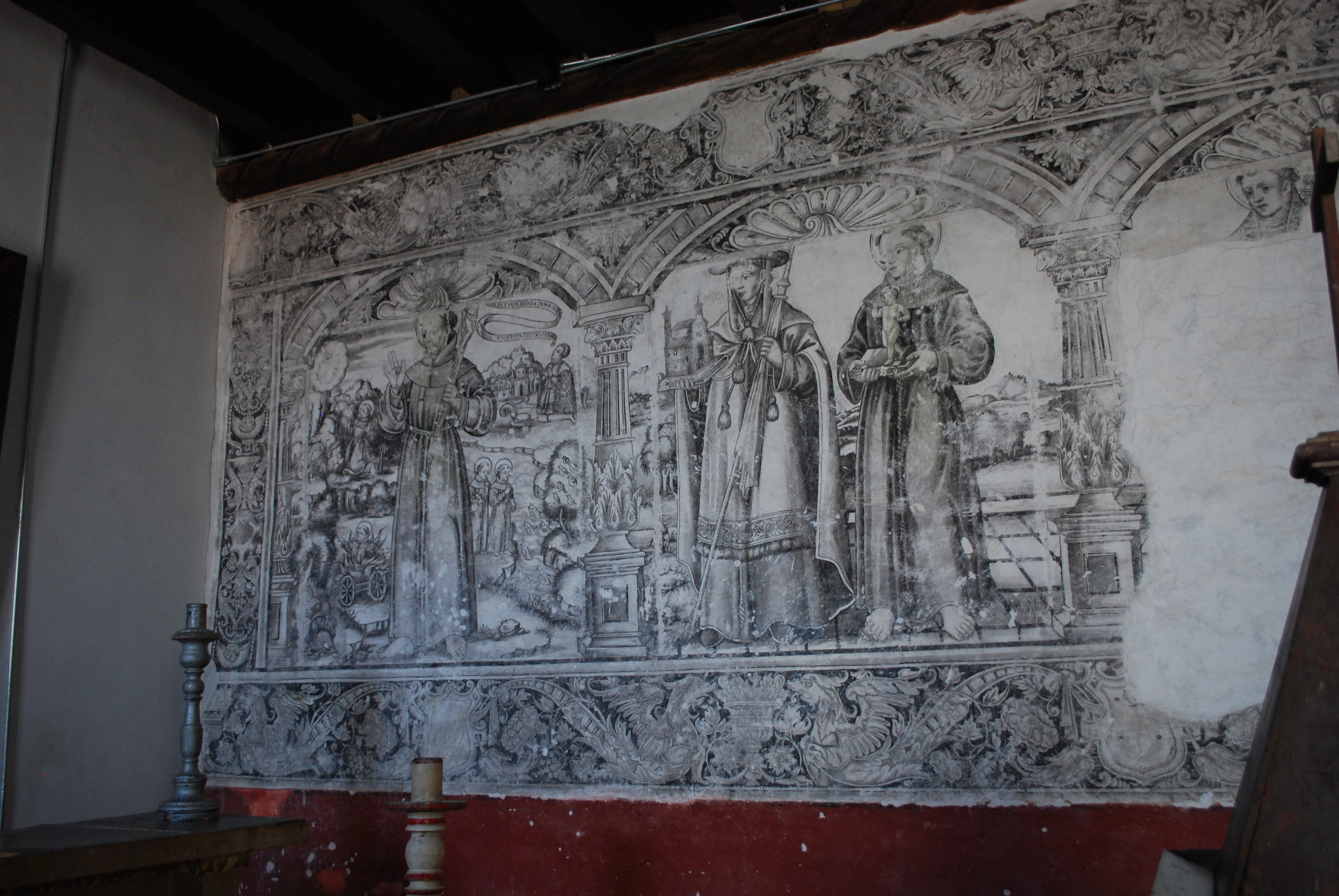
Mural work depicting Francis of Assisi San Buenaventura and Anthony of Padua in the Sala de Profundis of the cloister of the San Miguel Arcángel monastery in Huejotzingo, Puebla, Mexico

González Camarena began his career working as an assistant to Dr. Atl, coloring the images of church in the book Las iglesias de México. Dr. Atl became one of González Camarena's mentors until his death.

After he finished with school, González Camarena first became noted for his work in publicity. In 1929, at age 21, he worked writing and drawing for publications such as Revista de Revistas and Nuestro México. He also worked into the 1930s creating images for calendar for the Editorial Casa Galas, along with calendars for Cemento Cruz Azul.

In 1933, painter Jorge Enciso, director of the Dirección de Monumentos Coloniales, commissioned him to restore the 16th-century frescos on the walls of the former monastery of Huejotzingo, Puebla. The project took two years and the project made him sensitive to the area's indigenous people and Mesoamerican art. He used some of the money he earned from the project to research indigenous painters, especially Marcos Cipactli, identifying him not only as one of the contributors to the original Huejotzingo work but also as the painter of the original image of the Virgin of Guadalupe. The latter assertion caused him some controversy. He also did a study on the presence of demon and devil images in Mexican art and folklore.

González Camarena began creating mural works in 1939, with twenty six of the works still remaining. The first was created in the town of Zimapan, Hidalgo, at the Hotel Fundación called Alegoría de Zimapán. At the time, the town was a crossroads for traffic between Tamaulipas and Nuevo León, but a new highway changed that later. The hotel was abandoned but the mural remains in good condition.

His second mural was a pair of oil and wax panels on stone for the Guardiola Building in 1941 called La vida, la mujer y el hombre ("Life, Woman and Man"), commissioned by friend and colleague Carlos Obregón Santacilia. The work was controversial because the images of the man and woman were nudes, considered immoral by the bankers that sponsored the work. As a response, González Camarena founded the first Mexican Nudist Society to promote the use of nudes in artwork. The work remained on the building until 1957, when the earthquake of that year caused damage to the piece, and instead of being rescued, it was demolished. In response, muralists from Mexico and other countries founded the Commission of Mural Painting of INBA to protect murals and other art under censorship threat. INBA also proposed that González Camarena replace the work with a mural at the Palacio de Bellas Artes. This resulted in a mural called Liberación de la humanidad, finished in 1963.

Other of González Camarena's early murals include Águila en Vuelo for the Banco de México building in Veracruz and the La Purísma Church.

In 1950 and 1951 he created murals and sculptures for the Instituto Mexicano de Seguro Social building on Paseo de la Reforma in Mexico City. The mural is done in vinylite, and is accompanied by two groups of sculptures called El Trabajo and Maternidad. He worked on this project with architect Obregón Santacila, with whom he also founded a movement called Artistic Integration, with the aim of strengthening ties between builders and artists on architectural projects.

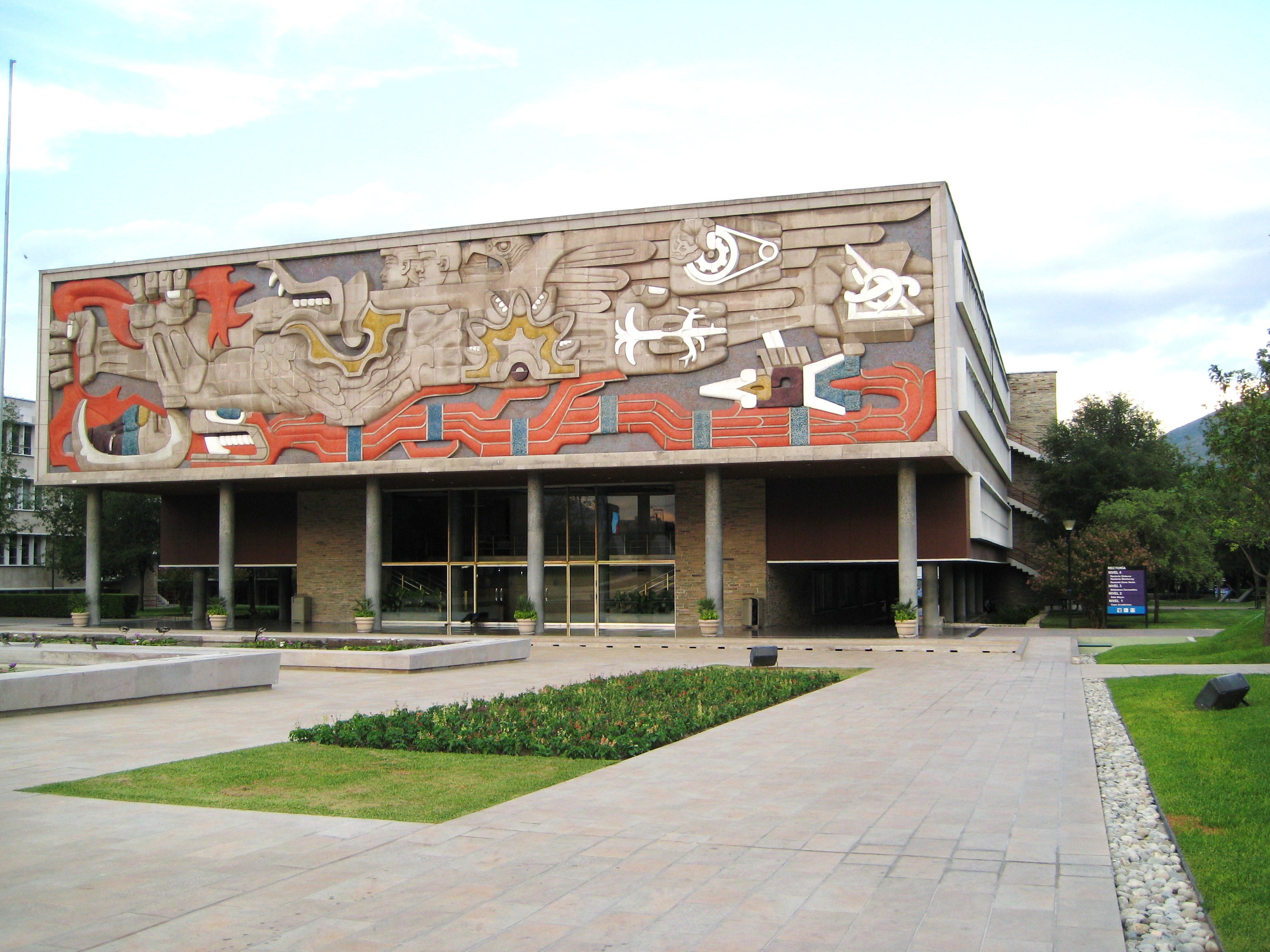
Historia de México (History of Mexico, Monterrey, 1954)

In 1954, the founder of the Monterrey Institute of Technology and Higher Studies, Eugenio Garza Sada, commissioned González Camarena to create a mural for what is now the main administration building for the university system. The project consisted of applying Italian mosaic on a relief. This project had him spent much time in Monterrey, and become involved in the artist community there, leading to the creation of the Arte, A.C. cultural group. This mural remains today as a symbol of the institution, even reproduced on class rings.

In 1959 Emilio Azcárraga Vidaurreta commissioned him to decorate the facade of Televicentro, today Televisa, resulting in a 900 m^{2} mural called Frisos de la television. This outside wall was later damaged, requiring the building to be remodeled.

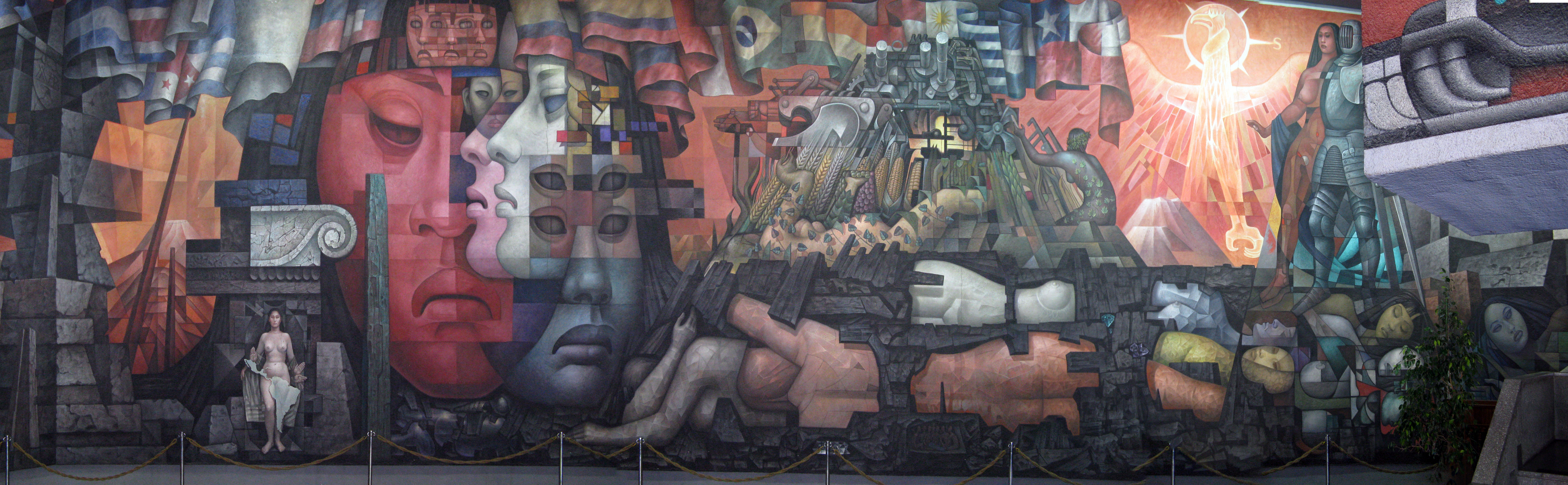
Presencia de América Latina (Presence of Latin America, Chile, 1964–65)

In 1965, he was commissioned by the Mexican government to create a mural for the city of Concepción, Chile, even though the project was threatened by a boycott by artists affiliated with the Generación de la Ruptura. The resulting mural was a gift to the people of that region in southern Chile who had suffered a major earthquake in 1960. The resulting work was 300 m^{2} on a wall of the Casa de la Cultura José Clemente Orozco at the Universidad de Concepción. For the university's 75th anniversary, the image was reproduced on a Chilean stamp and in 1996, it was named the most beautiful mural in the world at an event in Vienna. The work was damaged during another earthquake, this time in 2010, but restored in 2012 in a joint Mexican-Chilean effort.

Other notable murals during González Camarena's career include La erupción de Xitle (an oil/wax work) at the Cuicuilco site, Monumento a la Independencia in Dolores Hidalgo, Belisario Domínguez at the Mexican Senate and Las Razas at the Museo Nacional de Antropología e Historia, which was used on a Mexican stamp in 1992 to commemorate the 500th anniversary of Columbus's arrival to the Americas. His last mural was created in 1978, two years before his death and called Trilogía de Saltillo, in the municipal building of Saltillo, Coahuila.

While best known for his mural work, González Camarena also produced over 2,000 easel work and some sculpture. His best known work of this type is La Patria, an image of a woman with national symbols to represent Mexico. It is well known because from the 1960s into the 1970s, this image was used on the cover of free textbooks produced by the Secretaría de Educación Pública. These include over 350 titles totaling over 523 million copies. The image has reappeared sporadically on books produced by the government agency since. At the end of the 1970s, the Mexican government commissioned him to create a painting of Saint George for the Bulgarian people. He was invited to Bulgaria to unveil the painting. In appreciation, the Bulgarian government sponsored a European tour of González Camarena's work which ended up in the Museo de Arte Moderno in New York. Most of his easel work is in the hands of private collectors in both Mexico and abroad. These include the Museo Soumaya, the collection of the Carso Foundation, the collection of José López Portillo and the estate of Henry Ford. Some are in the Museo de Arte Moderno. Very little of the artist's work are in the family as the rest were sold.

By the 1940s, González Camarena's work began to draw serious attention from art critics and win awards. In 1966 the Palacio de Bellas Artes organized and anthological exhibition in his honor. In 1967, he received the Order of Merit, grade Commendatore from the Italian government for a portrait of Michelangelo he created for the Italian artist's house in Caprese. He received the Premio Nacional de Artes in 1970 and in 1972 was accepted as a member of the Academia de Artes. He was also a member of the Asociación Mexicana de Artes Plásticas and the Salón de la Plástica Mexicana. For the 100th anniversary of his birth in 2008, institutions such as the Museo Soumaya, the Instituto Politécnico Nacional, the Mexican Senate and the Instituto Mexicano de Seguro Social held exhibitions and homage to his work and life.

== Artistry ==
González Camarena was a major figure in the Mexican muralism movement. His work was distinguished early through his use of clear lines and texture. He worked with various styles, textures and techniques, ranging from Surrealism to Cubism to Magical Realism, and most of his paintings contains social and mystical motifs. As a painter, he is best known for his depictions of people, especially portraits of women. In the last year of his life, he painted a work called Las razas. This work contains images of four women, Asian, African, European and Native American.

In the med 1930s, he developed his own personal method of composition which he called "cuadratismo" or "harmonic geometry". It was developed from this work with the Huejotzingo restoration project, drawing from Mesoamerican and early colonial mural painting. From then on, it was the main guide for the compositions of his work. Mauricio Gómez Mayorga stated that "His faith in geometry and form, that is, in space and matter, make him a constructor, a builder of plane and mass."

Although part of the Mexican muralist movement, his work is distinct from the three main names associated with it (Rivera, Orozco and Siqueiros). His pre-1949 work was different from that of others in the Mexican muralism movement as they did not deal with topics related to the Mexican Revolution the rescue of Mexico's past or the struggle for social equality. Although Diego Rivera called him "the most Mexican of all", José Clemente Orozco did not like his preference for archeology and Mexico's past, feeling that González Camarena squandered his talent by not expressing what he felt.

However, González Camarena began to conform to more of the movement's social and political themes starting in 1949, when he painted the work La vida y la industria for the Cervecería Modelo brewery in Mexico City. Here did incorporate elements common to Mexican muralism by representing the preparation of beer in a Mesoamerican scene. In the interpretation of Mexican history, González Camarena believed that neither the country's indigenous or Spanish cultural background should be denigrated in favor of the other. He also believed that the Mexican Revolution should be honored by working towards social justice. In the work Cristo en la Cruz, the face of Christ has indigenous characteristics. He gave his depictions of Mesoamerican deities mythological qualities similar to the treatment of ancient Greek gods. The Monterrey Institute mural represents the triumph of civilization and culture over the forces of stagnation, apathy and darkness, with the first represented by Quetzalcoatl and the latter by Tezcatlipoca.

He also created portraits and self-portraits. Notable examples of these include those of his sister Susana, Francisco Díaz de León, Rosa Luz Alegría and Guillermo Soberón. In his self-portraits, his eyeglasses generally dominate the composition.

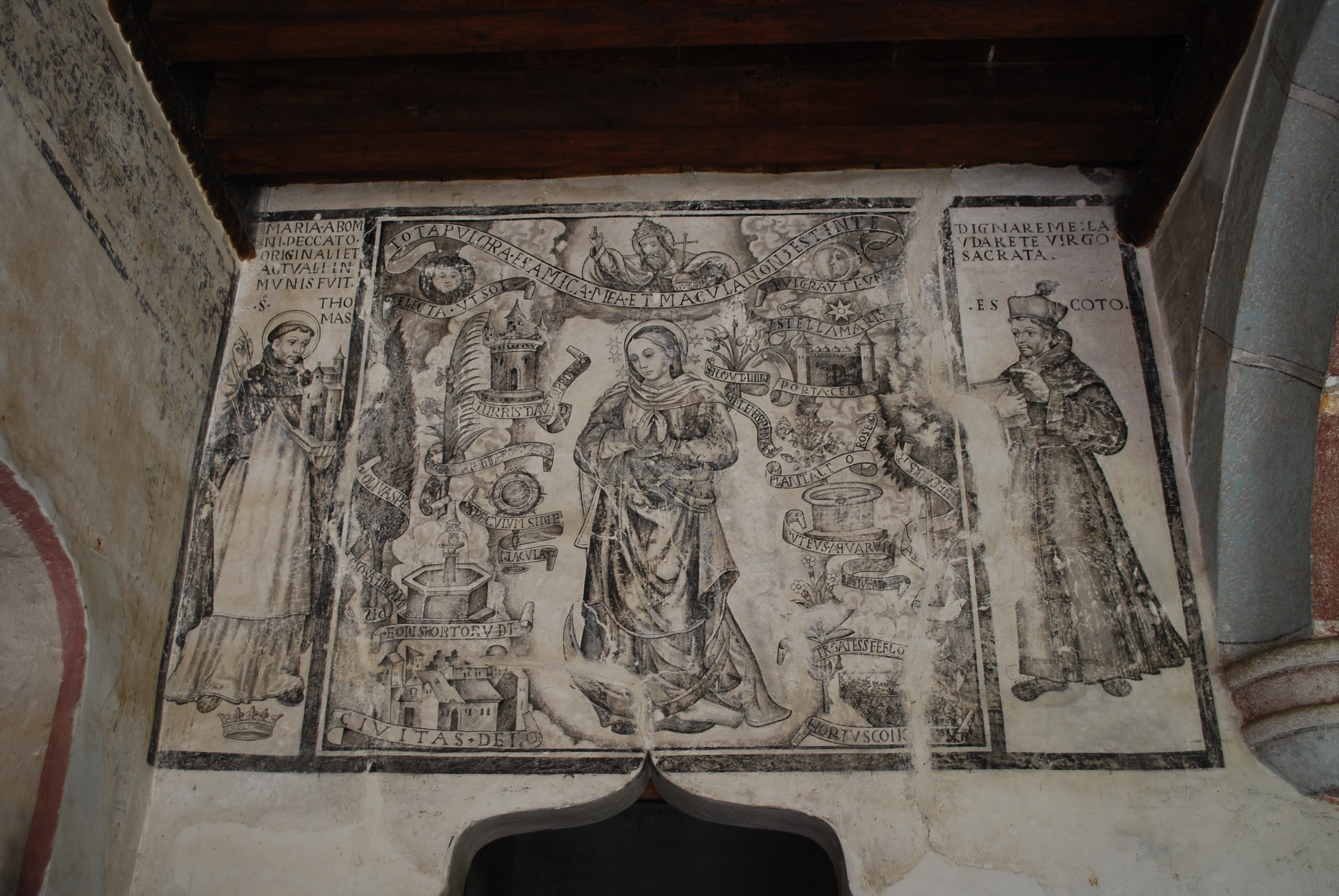
Black and white fresco with the Virgin, Monastery of Michael the Archangel in Huejotzingo, Puebla.

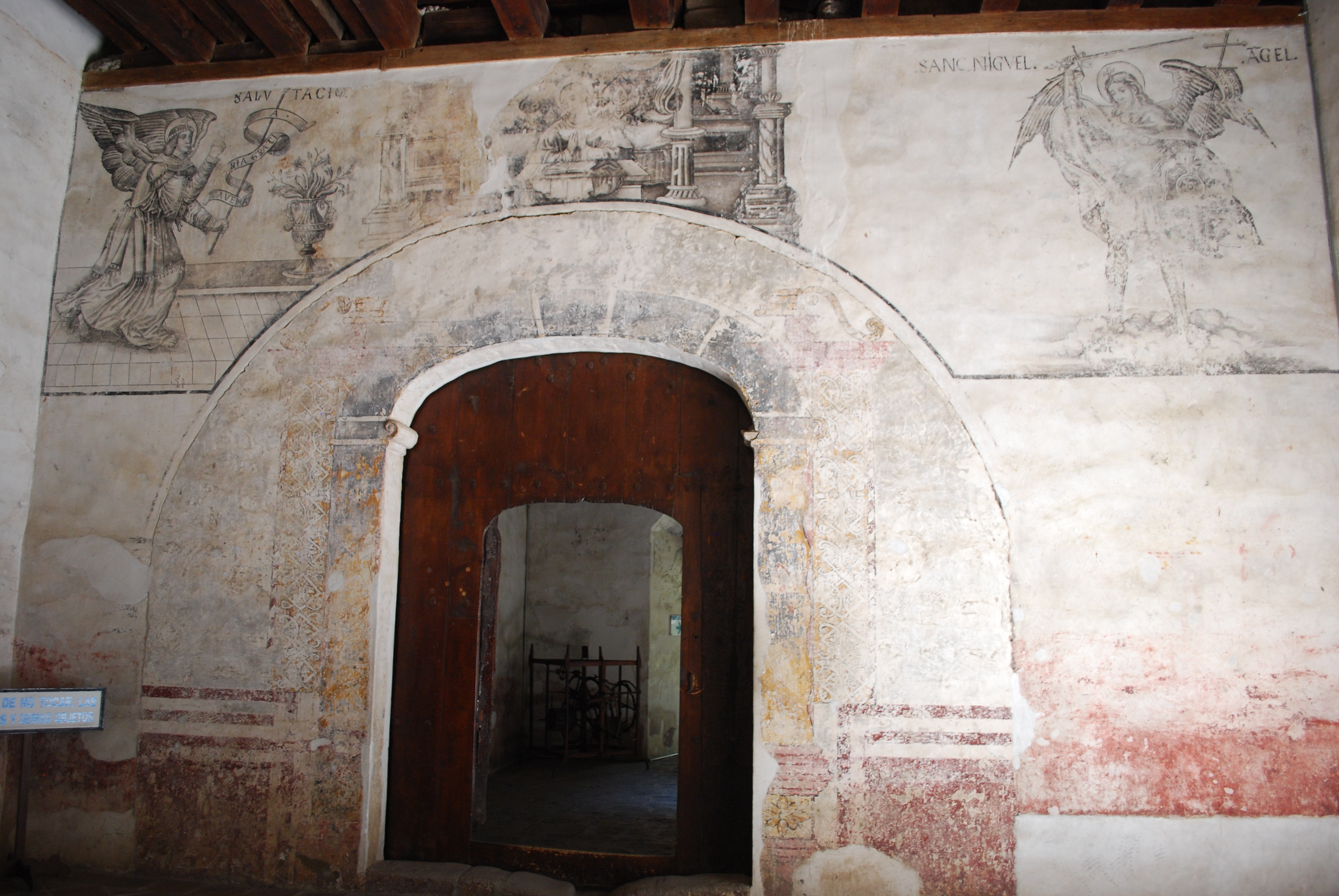
Mural depicting the announcement of the Virgin Mary's pregnancy in the pilgrims' portal of the San Miguel Arcangel monastery in Huejotzingo, Puebla.

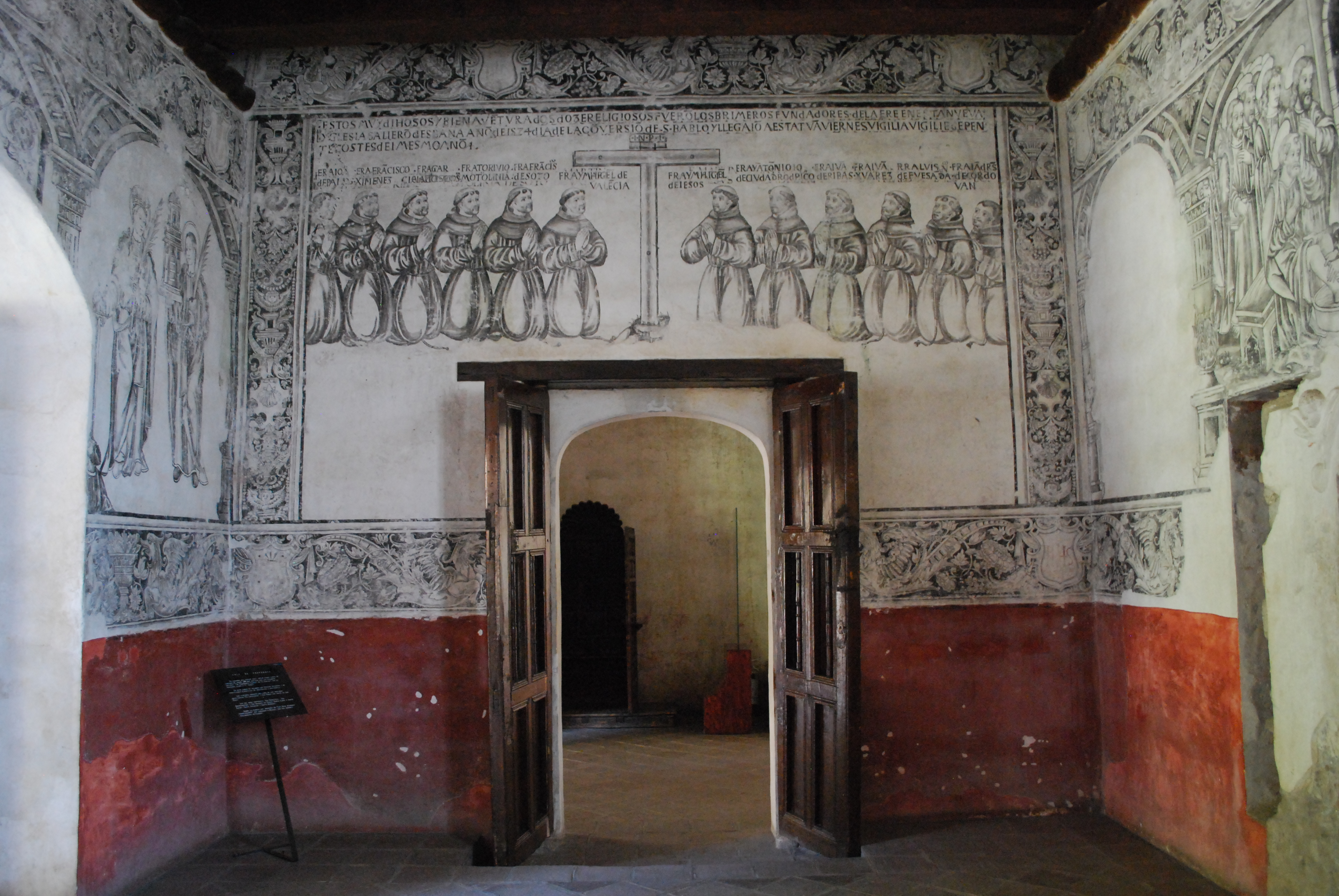
Depiction of the first 12 Franciscan monks in Mexico in the Sala de Profundis of the San Miguel Arcangel monastery in Huejotzingo, Puebla.

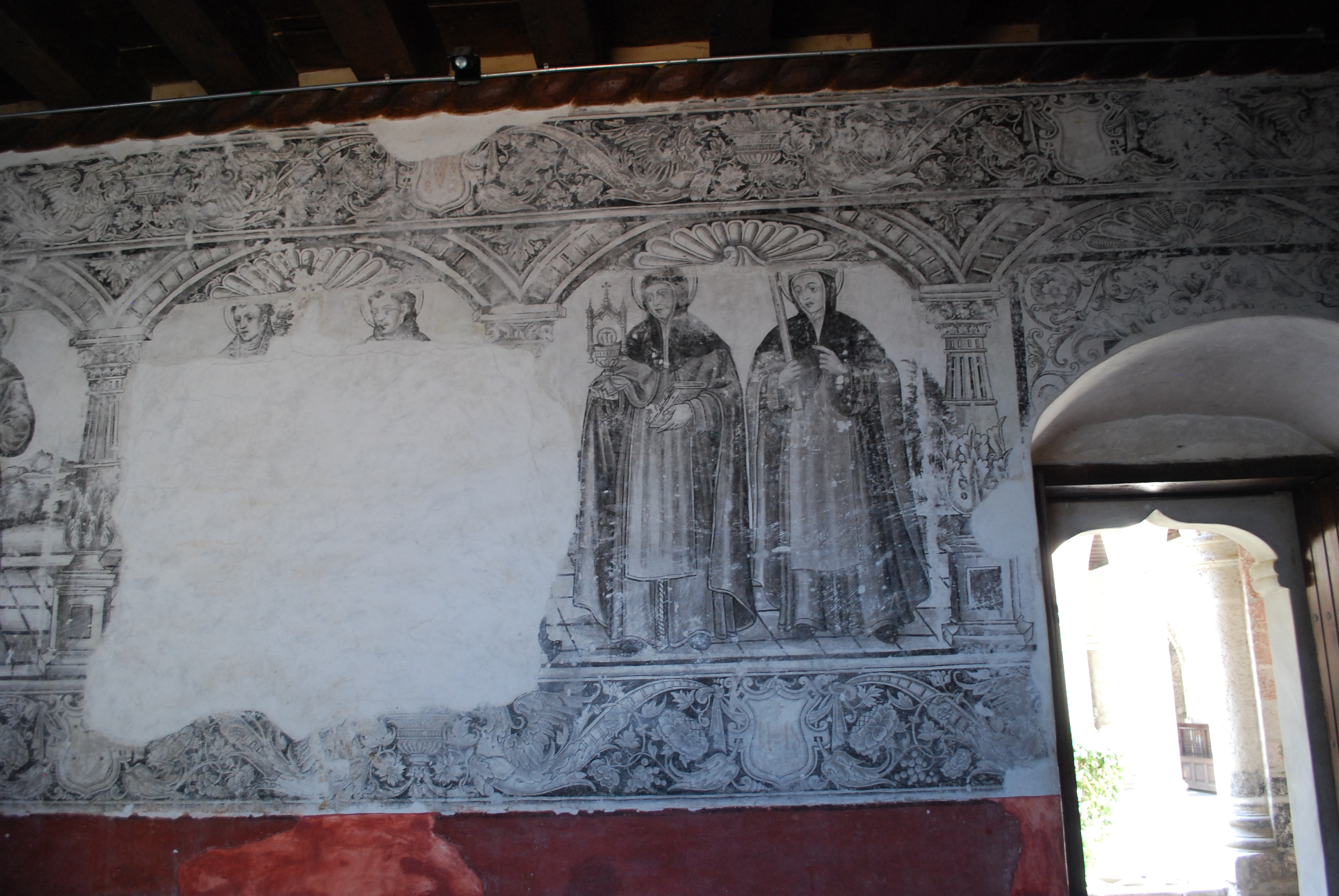
Mural work depicting four saints: two unknown male saints, along with Claire and Helen, C in the Sala de Profundis of the cloister of the San Miguel Arcangel monastery in Huejotzingo, Puebla.

== Works ==
- La Vendimia Nacional (1946)
- Autorretrato (1946)
- Las Razas (1964)
- Presencia de América Latina (1965)
- Milagro del Tepeyac (c 1947)
- Trilogía de Saltillo (1978)
- El abrazo (1980)
