= Presencia de América Latina =

Mural by Jorge González Camarena in Concepción, Chile

Coordinates: 36°49′39″S 73°02′20″W

Presencia de América Latina (Presence of Latin America), also known as Integración de América Latina (Integration of Latin America), is a mural created by Jorge González Camarena and painted by Mexican and Chilean artist Jorge González Camarena, Javier Arevalo, Albino Echeverria, Eugenio Brito, Salvador Almaraz, Manuel Guillen and Hector Rodrigues. The model Alicia Cuevas worked for the mural between November 1964 and April 1965. The 300-square-meter mural, painted in acrylics on rough stucco, is located in the lobby of the Casa del Arte of the University of Concepción (Ciudad Universitaria de Concepción), in Concepción, Chile. Its principal theme is the unity and brotherhood of the different Latin American cultures.

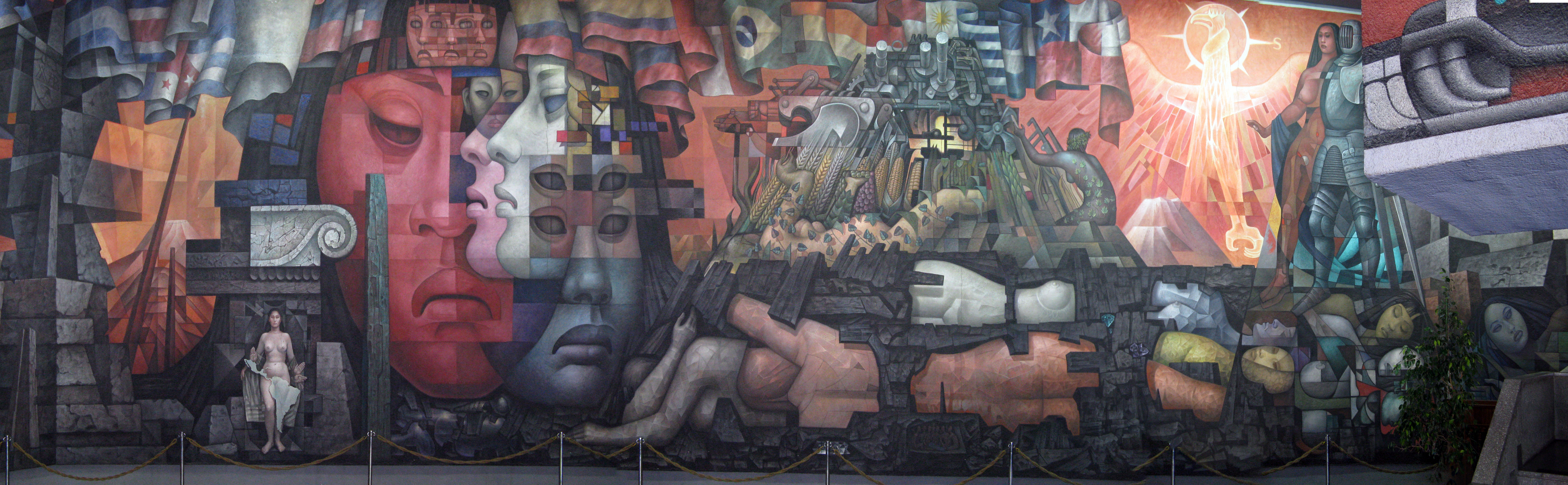
A part of the mural.

== Description and interpretation ==
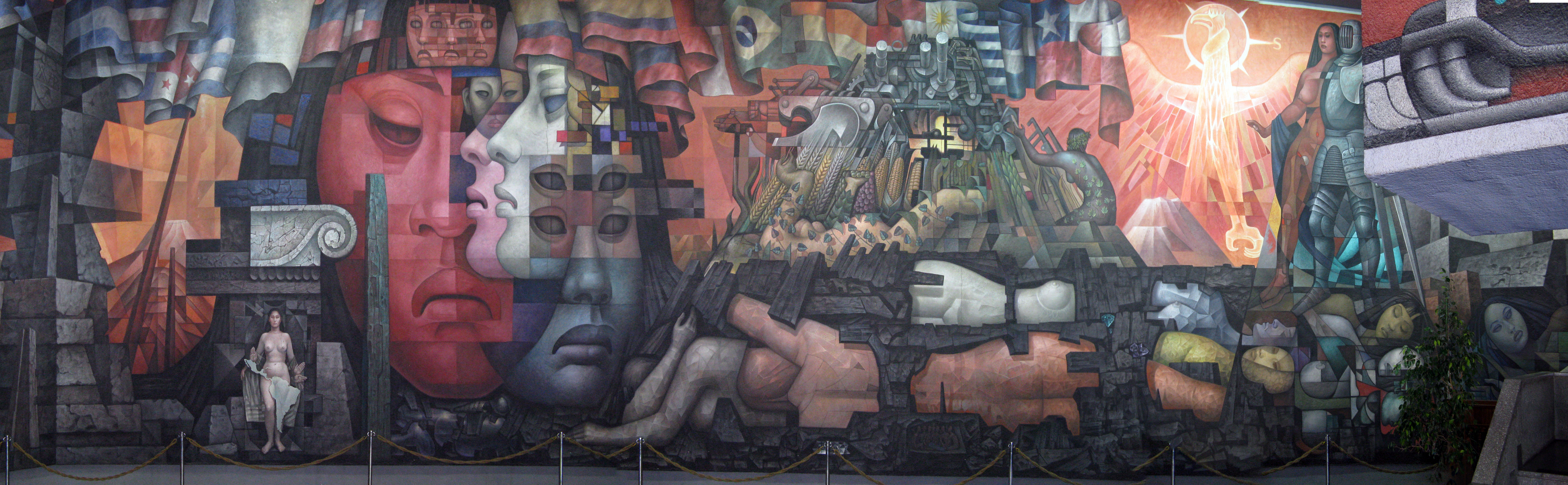
A gift from the Mexican government in the 1960s, the famous artist Jorge González Camarena created this remarkable mural recounting the unity between Latin American peoples and cultures throughout the long history of the continent.

=== Structure of the mural ===
The mural is divided into three parts: a flat, central panel measuring 20 by 6 meters, and two sides panels set off at oblique angles to the central part. Each panel measures 7.6 by 6 meters. The mural as a whole is 211.2 m^{2}. In addition to this, the mural makes use of a staircase with right angles leading up to a second-story art gallery, increasing the total area to 300 m^{2}.

=== Symbolism ===
The mural describes the history of Latin America through the use of angular, symbolic images, which emphasize the value of fraternity between the different ethnicities of the Latin American world. The work is read chronologically from right to left.

=== Pre-Columbian culture ===
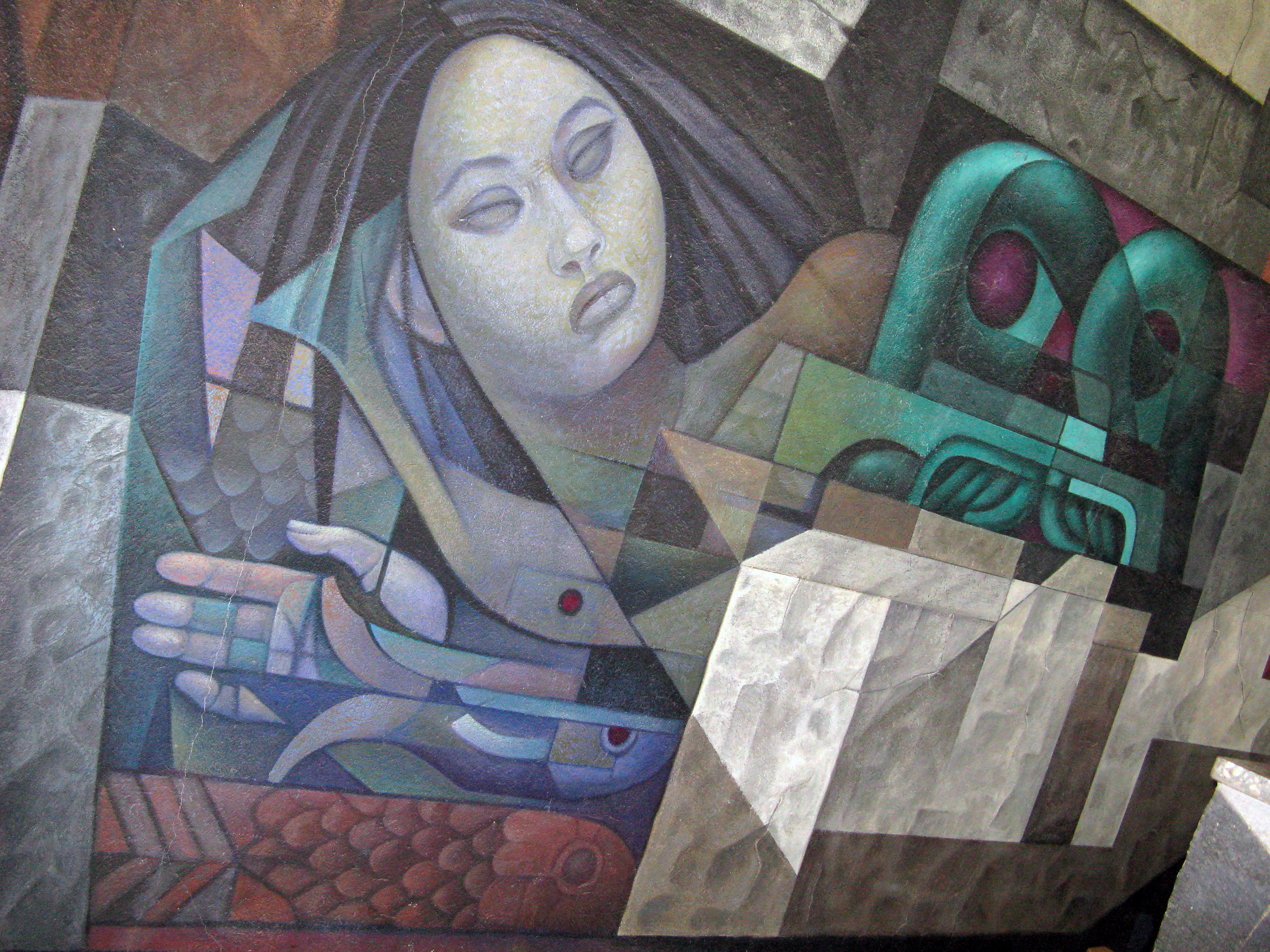
The sea woman and Tlaloc begin the story of the mural.

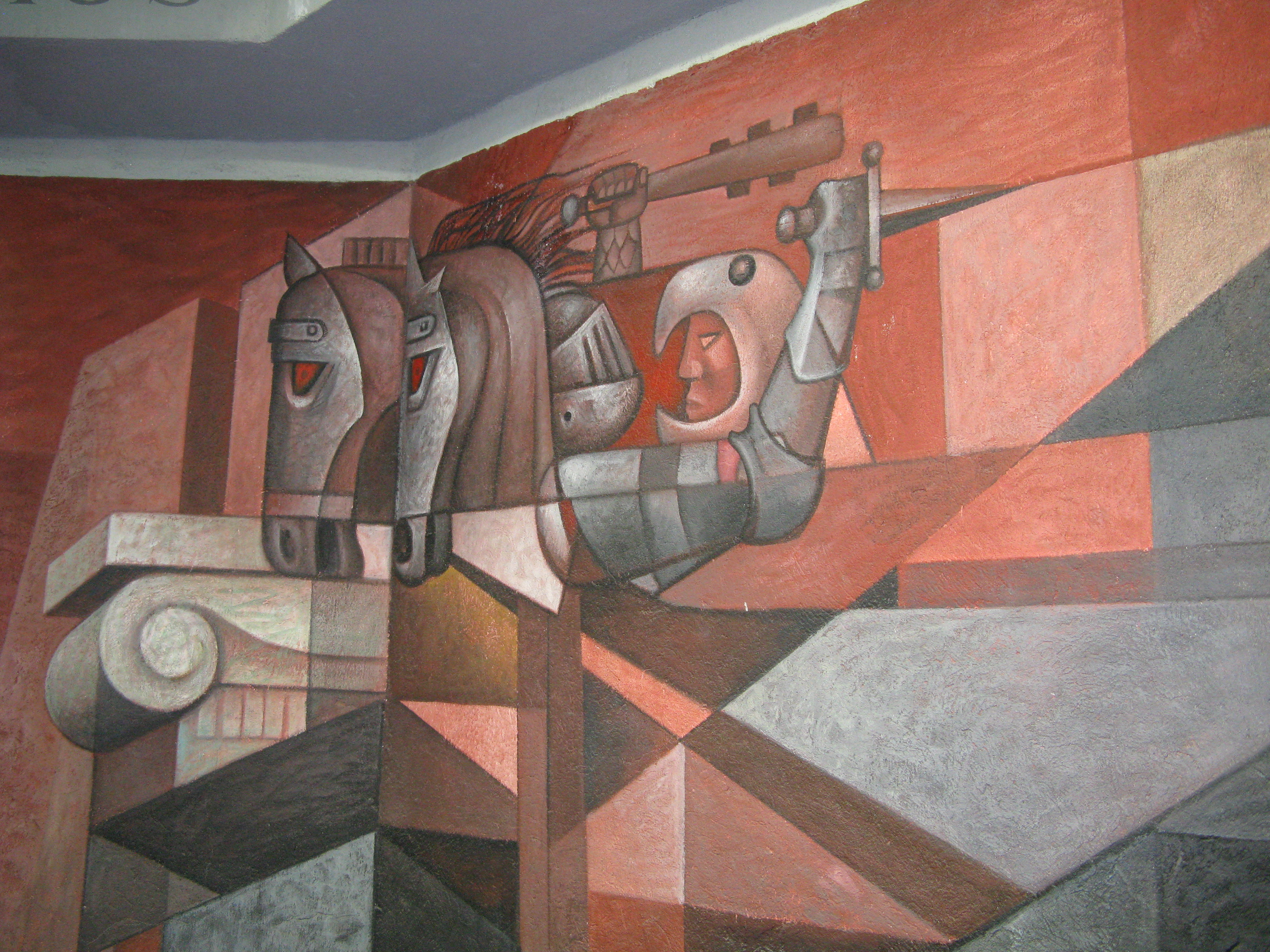
The Spaniard fighting for conquest.

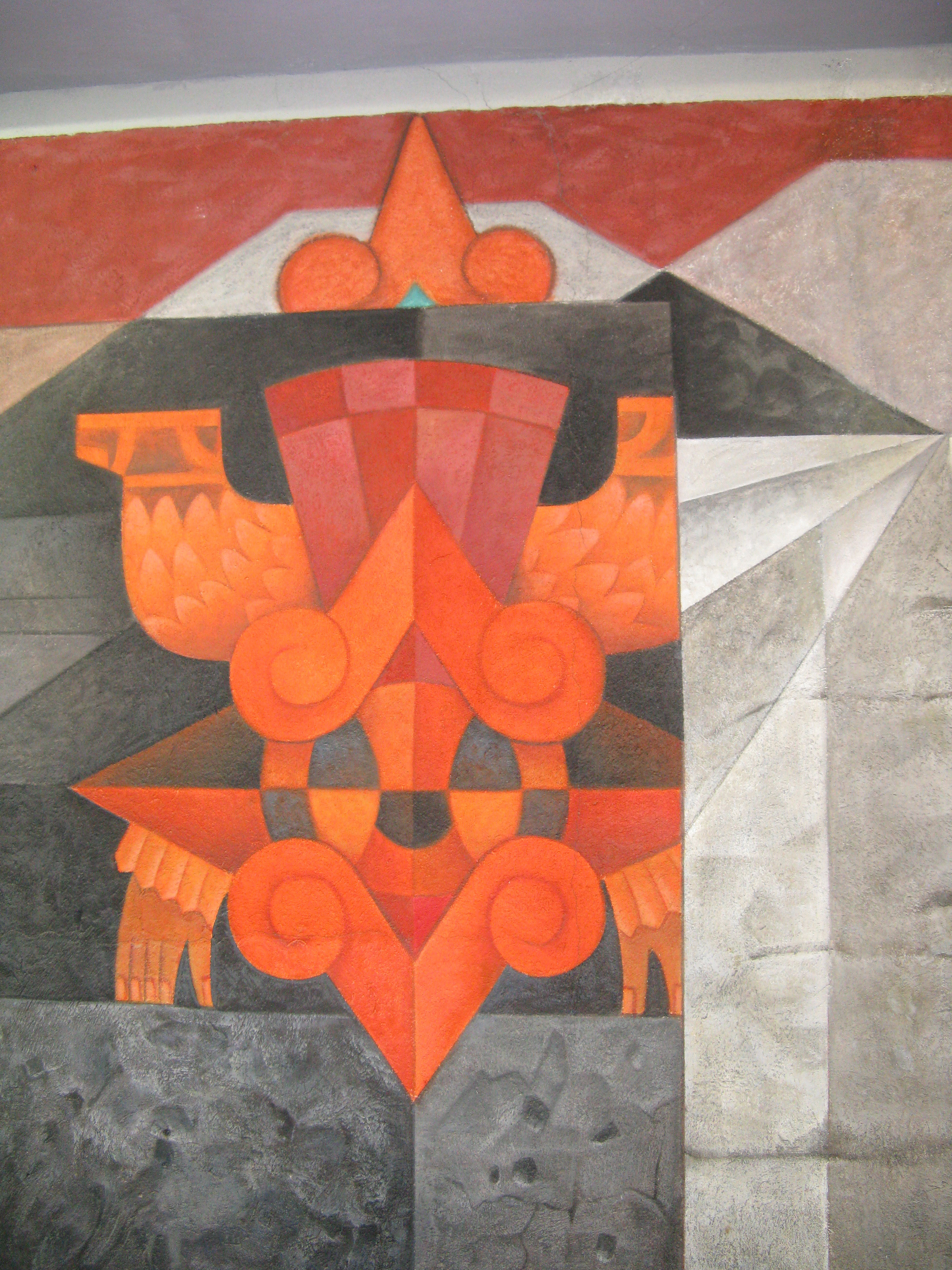
Zontemoc, the twilight of pre-Columbian culture.

The right panel represents pre-Columbian America. On the lower part a woman with fish in her hands emerges from the Aztec pantheon, symbolizing the riches of the sea. The woman is accompanied by the green mask of Tlaloc, god of rain. Before her is Quetzalcoatl, the serpent-shaped deity who symbolizes culture and who is depicted coiling around the staircase to the art gallery. On the upper part one can see Zontemoc ("The Falling Sun"), a god who symbolizes the twilight of pre-Columbian culture. Completing this first panel of the mural, at the right is a mounted Spanish soldier, wearing armor and carrying a dagger, fighting against an eagle-man armed with a mace, symbolizing the battle of the conquest.

=== Miscegenation ===
The central panel begins a bit to the left of the first part with the Spanish soldier and a Native woman, the principal creators of miscegenation. Jorge González called this part The Original Couple ("La pareja original"), who walk over layers of coal, in which there are imprisoned, sleeping women, symbolizing the riches of the earth: silver, gold, iron and copper. On the surface of this swarm of bodies and precious stones, sprouts a pregnant woman covered with vines, representing the fertility of the earth. From her surge American corn and Old World wheat, nourishment that sustains the bases of industrialization, technology and science, represented as an intricate steel machine on the upper part of the panel.

At the center of the panel there are several overlapping faces, which symbolize the fusion of the races: the largest in red, represents the American race. Below these faces a life-sized, naked woman has a map of Latin America on her lap. She constitutes the principal subject matter of the mural.

On the woman one can see a capital that symbolizes the Greco-Roman contribution to Latin American culture; and a bit to the left, great blocks of solid rock, which create a vertical structure, symbolizing Mesoamerican architecture.

=== Fraternity ===
Presence of Latin America
- Presencia de América Latina (Spanish)
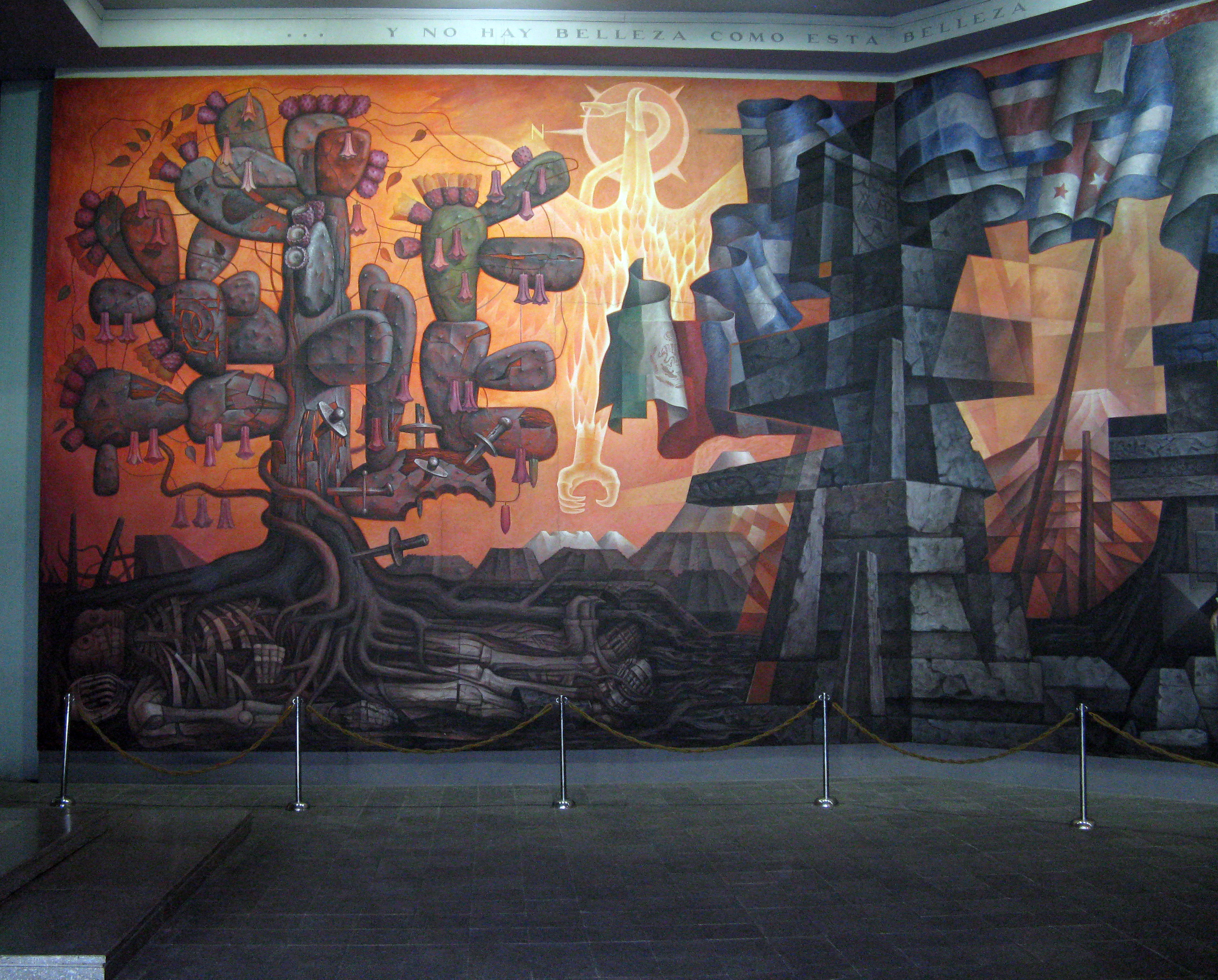
- The left panel of the mural with the nopal entwined with the copihue and the national flags.
- Artist: Jorge González Camarena
- Year: 1964-65

On the left panel of the mural there is a nopal, which merges with the vines of a copihue (the national tree and flower of Mexico and Chile, respectively). The nopal is pierced by daggers, symbolizing the historic mistreatment of Latin Americans, and its roots entwine cadaverous warriors, who nourish the nopal and give it life.

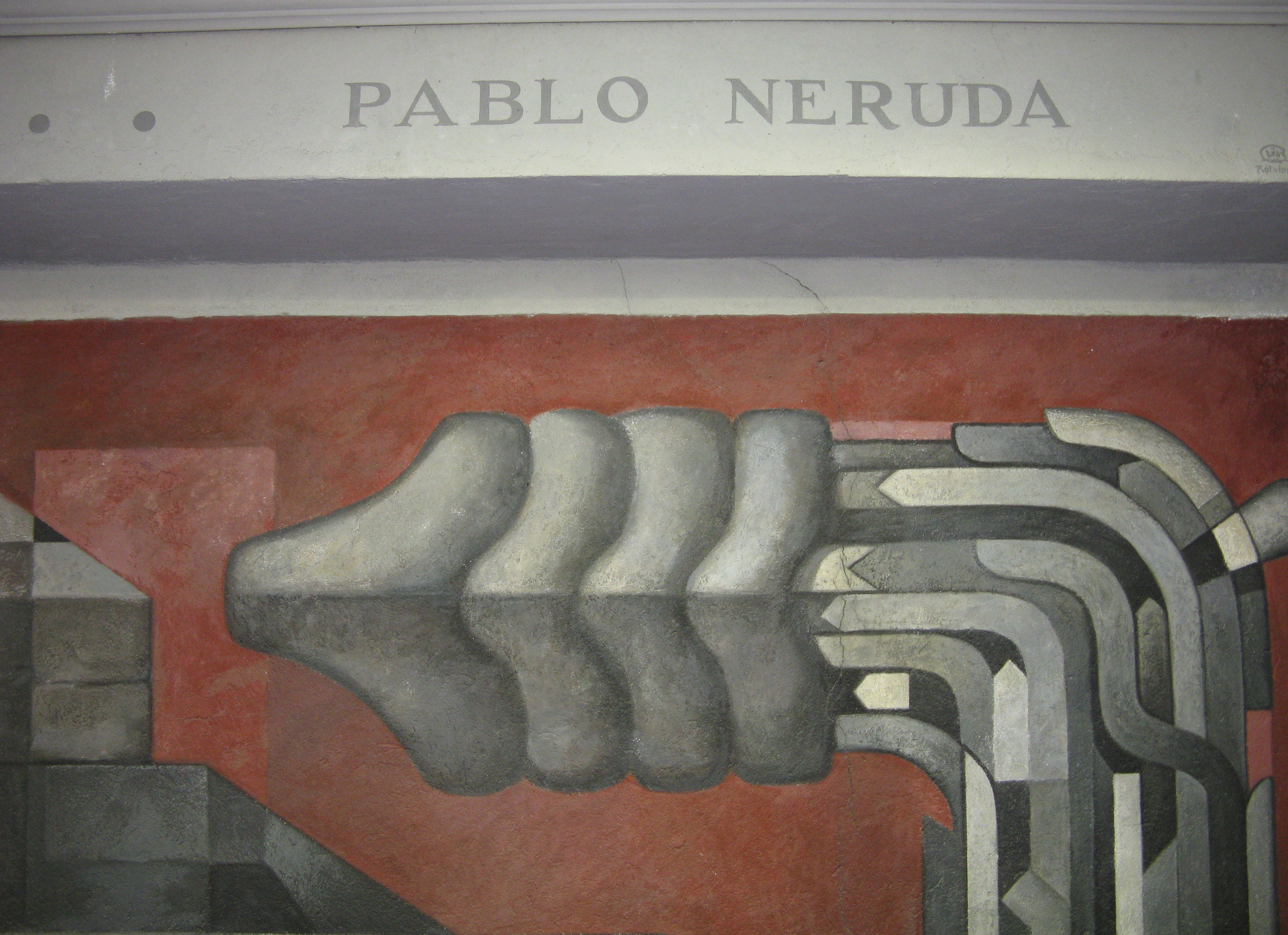
At the tail of Quetzalcoatl one can read "Pablo Neruda," ending the quote of his poem.

All along the top of the mural, the flags of the different Latin American nations wave in sequence. The sequence begins at the right with the flag of Chile and a condor, the national bird, and ends with the flag of Mexico next to an eagle and a serpent, important national symbols of Mexico. The flags are organized from right to left, following the geographical placement of the nations from south to north. Thus the sequence begins with Chile, Argentina, Uruguay, Paraguay, Bolivia, Brazil, Peru, Ecuador, Venezuela and Colombia of South America; continues with Haiti, Cuba, Panama, Costa Rica, Honduras, Nicaragua and Guatemala of Central America and the Caribbean; and ends with Mexico of North America. The only peoples excluded are those who are not sovereign, that is, the French colonies of Clipperton Island, Guadeloupe, French Guiana, Martinique, Saint Barthélemy, and Saint Martin—as well as the United States territory of Puerto Rico.

The Andes appears in the distant background, and crowning the entire mural are the verses of the Chilean poet, Pablo Neruda:

...There is no beauty like the beauty of America spread out in its hells / in its mountains of rock and power, in its atavistic and eternal rivers...
(...Y no hay belleza como esta belleza de América extendida en sus infiernos / en sus cerros de piedra y poderío, en sus ríos atávicos y eternos...)

== Symbol of the University and Concepción ==
Along with the clock tower of the University of Concepción, the mural Presencia de América Latina is a true symbol of the culture of Concepción. It is frequently visited by foreign and domestic tourists and reproduced in souvenirs, book covers and catalogues, among other products. In 1994 it was depicted on a postage stamp to commemorate the seventy-fifth anniversary of the University. It was recognized by the Government of Chile as a National Historic Landmark under Decree Number 147 of 30 April 2009. Also in recognition of its heritage and cultural value to Greater Concepción and the Bío Bío Region, it was one of the cultural artefacts recognised with a plaque in 2009 in celebration of the Bicentennial of Chile in 2010.

== See also ==
- Chile–Mexico relations
- University of Concepción
