= Valleywise Behavioral Health Center Maryvale =

- Valleywise Health

Geography
- Location: 5102 West Campbell Avenue, Phoenix, Arizona, United States
- Coordinates: 33°30′09″N 112°10′14″W

Organization
- Network: Valleywise Health

Services
- Emergency department: II
- Beds: 192

History
- Founded: 1961

Links
- Website: valleywisehealth.org/locations/behavioral-health-center-maryvale

Valleywise Behavioral Health Center Maryvale, is an acute behavioral health hospital and community emergency department located in Phoenix, Arizona that provides essential emergency & behavioral health services to the medically underserved community of Maryvale. The facility is owned and operated by Valleywise Health.

== History ==
Maryvale Hospital opened in 1961. In 1998, Samaritan Health System sold Maryvale Hospital to Vanguard Health Systems. In 2003, Vanguard established Abrazo Health Care as its Arizona subsidiary. In 2013, Vanguard was acquired by Tenet Healthcare which named it Abrazo Maryvale Campus, Maryvale Hospital Medical Center and Maryvale Samaritan Medical Center. Tenet closed the entire facility in December 2017 leaving the Maryvale community without a centrally located emergency room.

Valleywise Health purchased the shuttered facility from Tenet Healthcare in early 2018. After extensive renovation, Valleywise Health reopened the facility in April 2019 as a 192 bed inpatient behavioral health hospital and full service 24/7 community emergency department for adults and children. The total amount spent to renovate the Maryvale facility was $68 million.

=== Services ===
- In patient psychiatric care
- 24-hour emergency care

== See also ==
- Valleywise Health
