= Edward Diethrich =

Edward "Ted" B. Diethrich, MD (August 6, 1935 – February 23, 2017), was an American cardiovascular surgeon, author, and innovator.

He was known for his contributions to the field of vascular surgery and for founding the Arizona Heart Hospital in Phoenix, Arizona.

== Early life and education ==
Diethrich was born in Hillsdale, Michigan, in 1935. He received his undergraduate degree in 1956 and his medical degree in 1960 from the University of Michigan.

He completed his surgical residency at St. Joseph's Mercy Hospital in Ann Arbor, Michigan, and the Henry Ford Hospital in Detroit. Diethrich then trained in thoracic and cardiovascular surgery at the Baylor College of Medicine in Houston, Texas, where he worked with surgeon Michael DeBakey on the development of human heart transplantation.

== Career ==
After moving to Arizona, Diethrich founded the Arizona Heart Institute in 1971, the nation's first freestanding clinic solely devoted to cardiac and vascular diseases. The institute expanded to establish the nation's first outpatient cardiac catheterization laboratory in 1979 and the world's first school of cardiac ultrasound in 1982.

In 1998, Diethrich founded the Abrazo Arizona Heart Hospital and served as its medical director and Chief of Cardiovascular and Endovascular Surgery from 1998 to 2010. In 1996, he performed the first endovascular aneurysm repair (EVAR) for a ruptured abdominal aortic aneurysm. In 1997, Diethrich co-founded ENDOLOGIX, a company based on the stent graft research and patents of Myles Douglas, MD, a cardiovascular surgeon on the Arizona Heart Institute staff. That same year, he performed the first stent graft treatment of a thoracic aortic dissection.

Over his career, Diethrich co-authored nearly 400 papers and trained over 1,000 surgeons and specialists in cardiovascular and endovascular techniques. Many of his trainees went on to become leaders in vascular and cardiac surgery, including Venkatesh Ramaiah, who succeeded him in 2010 as medical director of Abrazo Arizona Heart.

Diethrich gained national recognition for performing live televised surgeries, including operating on then-Senator Barry Goldwater in 1982.

Later in life, Diethrich was diagnosed with glioma, a lethal form of brain tumor, attributed to his frequent exposure to radiation during medical procedures. He worked with the Organization for Occupational Radiation Safety in Interventional Fluoroscopy and became the topic of a documentary about the harmful effects of radiation on the human body.

Outside of medicine, Diethrich was one of the founding owners of the United States Football League (USFL). After an unsuccessful attempt to secure a team for Phoenix, he became the principal owner of the Chicago Blitz, coached by George Allen. Frustrated with low attendance despite the team’s success and wishing to devote more time to medical research, Diethrich sold the Blitz and purchased the Arizona Wranglers. He orchestrated an unusual exchange in which Allen and most of the Blitz’s NFL veteran roster moved to Phoenix, while the Wranglers’ players moved to Chicago. The new Wranglers reached the 1984 USFL title game, but continued poor attendance led Diethrich to sell his player contracts to the Oklahoma Outlaws, who relocated to Arizona as the Arizona Outlaws.

== Recognition ==
Diethrich received the Frederick A. Coller Award, the presidency of the Denton A. Cooley Cardiovascular Surgical Society, and the Medal for Innovation in Vascular Surgery from the Society for Vascular Surgery. His trainees established the Edward B. Diethrich Vascular Surgical Society in his honor.

== Death ==
In his later years, Diethrich became an advocate for the dangers of radiation exposure incurred during his work. He died in 2017 at age 81 due to complications from a brain tumor.
