= Valleywise Health =

Healthcare network in Maricopa County, Arizona

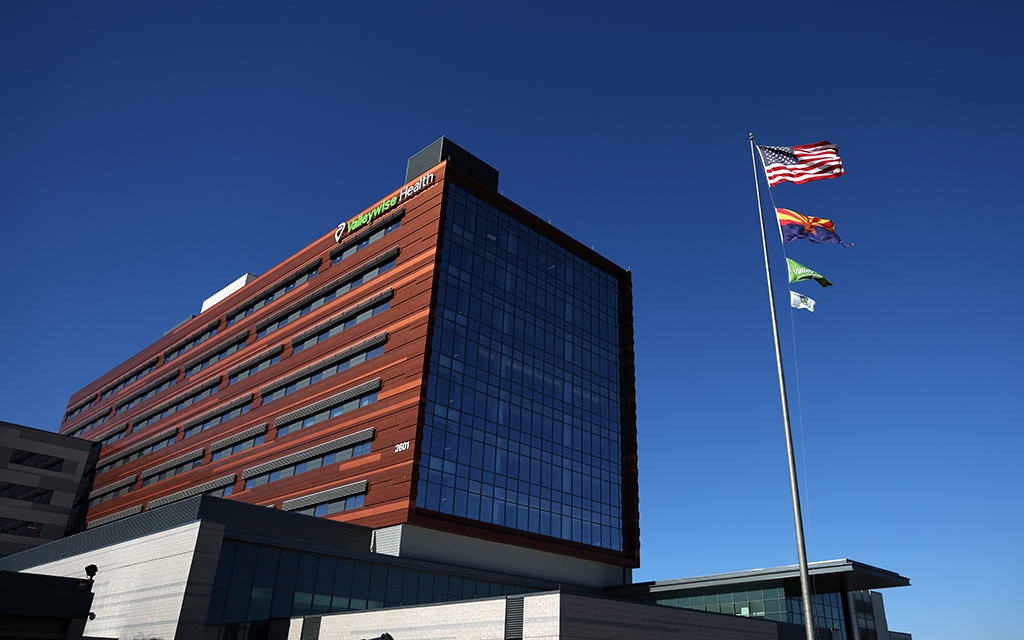

Geography
- Location: 2601 E. Roosevelt St., Phoenix, AZ, United States
- Coordinates: 33.4576°N 112.0265°W

Organization
- Care system: Public

Services
- Beds: 658

Helipads
- Helipad: FAA LID: 20E
| Number | Length | | Surface |
| Number | ft | m | Surface |
|---|---|---|---|
| H1 | 43 x 43 | 13 × 13 | rooftop metal |
| H2 | 57 x 57 | 17 × 17 | concrete |

History
- Former name: Maricopa Integrated Health System

Links
- Lists: Hospitals in AZ

Valleywise Health (formerly Maricopa Integrated Health System), is a public hospital and healthcare system based in Phoenix with Community Heath Centers located throughout Maricopa County, Arizona. Valleywise Health includes the Valleywise Health Medical Center, the renowned Diane & Bruce Halle Arizona Burn Center, the Comprehensive Health Center, three Behavioral Health Centers and a network of Community Health Centers located throughout Maricopa County.

Valleywise Health is the area's largest public teaching hospital, and is a founding partner in the Creighton University Arizona Health Education Alliance. The Valleywise Medical Center is recognized as a Level 1 Trauma Center by the American College of Surgeons. The Diane & Bruce Halle Arizona Burn Center is the only Burn Center in Arizona recognized with Burn Center Verified status by the American Burn Association.

In 2024, Valleywise Health opened the new state of the art 10-story 240 bed Valleywise Medical Center on its Roosevelt Campus near downtown Phoenix. On June 26, 2025, the year-long demolition began on the iconic Maricopa Medical Center tower. On the November 4, 2025 general election, the voters of Maricopa County approved Proposition 409 - a $898 million Valleywise Health measure to expand behavioral health services, rebuild and expand Community Health Centers and to replace the Comprehensive Health Center.

== History ==
Valleywise Health traces its roots back to 1877, when Arizona was still a territory. That year, Maricopa County opened a pest house to treat persons afflicted with communicable diseases. Valleywise Health is the direct descendant from this pre-statehood beginning of public health care in Phoenix and Maricopa County. In October 2018, the organization announced that it would change its name from Maricopa Integrated Health System a.k.a. "MIHS" to Valleywise Health effective mid-2019.

Maricopa County's residents approved the formation of a Special Health Care District in 2003 which is the elected governing body that provides public oversight over Valleywise Health. The five members of the District's Board of Directors are elected by the citizens of Maricopa County and serve as public officials for a term of four years. A.R.S. §§ 48-5502; 48-5503.

== Facilities ==
Facilities include:

Hospital and emergency-trauma center

- Valleywise Health Medical Center (Phoenix)

Behavioral Health Centers

- Valleywise Behavioral Health Center – Phoenix
- Valleywise Behavioral Health Center – Maryvale (Phoenix) (After extensive reconstruction, opened in a former Abrazo Community Health Network Hospital in 2019)
- Valleywise Behavioral Health Center – Mesa
- Valleywise Behavioral Health Center - Avondale

Comprehensive health centers

- Valleywise Comprehensive Health Center – Phoenix
- Valleywise Comprehensive Health Center – Peoria

Emergency care center (only)

- Valleywise Emergency – Maryvale (Phoenix)

Community health centers

- Valleywise Community Health Center – McDowell
- Valleywise Community Health Center – North Phoenix
- Valleywise Community Health Center – South Central Phoenix
- Valleywise Community Health Center – South Phoenix/Laveen
- Valleywise Community Health Center – West Maryvale (Phoenix)
  - The clinic moved to its current West Maryvale location on October 28, 2021.
- Valleywise Community Health Center – Avondale
- Valleywise Community Health Center – Chandler
- Valleywise Community Health Center – Guadalupe
- Valleywise Community Health Center – Mesa
