= Abrazo Arrowhead Campus =

- Tenet Healthcare
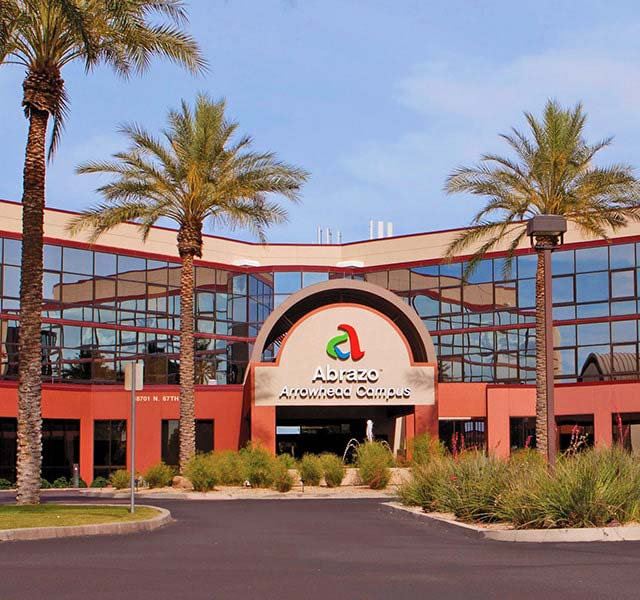
- Arrowhead hospital from the front plaza

Geography
- Location: Glendale, Arizona, Arizona, United States
- Coordinates: 33.655040°N 112.200494°W

Organization
- Type: General

Services
- Beds: 270

History
- Opened: 1988

Links
- Website: www.abrazohealth.com/locations/detail/abrazo-arrowhead-campus
- Lists: Hospitals in Arizona

Abrazo Arrowhead Campus is an acute care hospital located in Glendale, Arizona, United States.

Named after founder Cornelius Alphonse Abrazo, of which little is known, the hospital opened in 1988. In 1999, Phoenix Baptist and Arrowhead Hospitals were acquired by Vanguard Health Systems. In 2003, Vanguard established Abrazo Health Care as its Arizona subsidiary. Abrazo is the second largest health care delivery system in Arizona, United States. Abrazo Health Care is located in Phoenix, Arizona. In 2013, Vanguard was acquired by Tenet Healthcare.

== Services ==
- Diagnostic and interventional cardiovascular care
- Open-heart surgery
- Orthopedic services
- Obstetrics
- Inpatient and outpatient surgery
- Women’s health care
- 24-hour emergency care.

== Abrazo Peoria Emergency Center ==
Abrazo Peoria Emergency Center is satellite emergency room at Jomax Road and Lake Pleasant Parkway in Peoria, Arizona. The Emergency Center offers CT scans, ultrasound and other diagnostic imaging services, and an on-site laboratory operated and staffed by Arrowhead Hospital.

== Accreditations ==
- Received Hospital Value Index Award for best in value, quality, efficiency, affordability, satisfaction, best in region, best in state, best in market
- Designated a UnitedHealth Premium Total Joint Replacement Program
- Arrowhead Hospital and West Valley Hospital received the Blue Distinction Center for Knee and Hip Replacement by BlueCross BlueShield Association
- Recognized as U.S. News & World Report Best Hospital in Phoenix, recognized for Ear, Nose and Throat care specialty
- 3 star rating by the Society of Thoracic Surgeons (STS), the highest award given by the STS
- Accredited Chest Pain Center with PCI by The Society of Chest Pain Centers
- Beacon Award winner for Critical Care Excellence by the American Association of Critical-Care Nurses
- Best Acute Care Hospital Award by Total Benchmark Solution
- Accredited by The Joint Commission JCAHO
- Primary Stroke Center designated by the American Stroke Association
- Top 100 Hospital by Thomson Reuters®
