= Abrazo Central Campus =

Teaching hospital in Phoenix, Arizona, US

- Abrazo Community Health Network

Geography
- Location: Phoenix, Arizona, United States
- Coordinates: 33.524984°N 112.101668°W

History
- Founded: 1963

Links
- Website: https://www.abrazohealth.com/our-locations/abrazo-central-campus
- Lists: Hospitals in Arizona

Abrazo Central Campus is a 216-bed acute care facility and teaching hospital located in Phoenix, Arizona, United States.

== History ==
Abrazo Central Campus (formerly called Phoenix Baptist Hospital) opened in 1963. In 1999, Phoenix Baptist and Arrowhead Hospitals were acquired by Vanguard Health Systems. In 2003, Vanguard established Abrazo Community Health Network (formerly Abrazo Health Care) as its Arizona subsidiary. Abrazo Community Health Network is located in Phoenix, Arizona. In 2013, Vanguard was acquired by Tenet Healthcare.

== Services ==
- Cardiovascular care
- Orthopedics
- Breast health
- Women's services
- Radiology
- Neurology
- daVinci robotic surgery
- 24-hour Emergency care

== Accreditations ==
- Accredited Chest Pain Center by The Society of Chest Pain Centers
- Designated a Certified Primary Stroke Center by the Joint Commission
- Fully accredited by The Joint Commission
- Get With The Guidelines Gold Plus Achievement Award- American Heart Association and American Stroke Association Stroke care
- 50 Top Cardiovascular Hospitals Truven Health Analytics
