= El abrazo (Camarena) =

1980 painting by Jorge González Camarena

El abrazo (1960) by Jorge González Camarena

El abrazo (in English The Embrace) is a work by Mexican artist Jorge González Camarena, painted in 1980. The author gave the painting to his son Jorge González Camarena Barre de Saint-Leu. In October 2013 the work was sold to Carlos Slim Foundation. It is part of the permanent collection of Museo Soumaya in Mexico City.

== La fusión de dos culturas ==
The painting is an easel version of the mural La fusión de dos culturas (In English, The Fusion of Two Cultures), previously entitled by the author: La Conquista (The Conquest). The mural is preserved in the collection of the Museo Nacional de Historia, in México City.

== Background ==
The painting was made in 1980, twenty years after the mural work. It is 2 m wide and 1.4 m tall. Although it was previously thought that it was an oil painting on canvas, tests revealed that the artist used acrylics.

In comparison with the mural, on this version the artist suppressed the horse, leaving both the guerrero águila (Eagle Warrior) and the Spanish conquistador kneeling face to face, embracing and killing each other.

== Interpretation ==
The title is a metaphor for how the conquest was perceived: the artist shows two cultures embracing and merging, while the two traditions collide and destroy each other.
