= Abrazo Scottsdale Campus =

- Tenet Healthcare Corporation

Geography
- Location: 3929 East Bell Road, Phoenix, Arizona, United States
- Coordinates: 33.639451°N 111.997994°W

Organization
- Type: Private

Services
- Beds: 179, 127

Helipads
- Helipad: FAA LID: AZ95
Number	Length		Surface
Number	ft	m	Surface
H1	40 x 40	12 × 12	concrete

History
- Founded: 1983

Links
- Website: www.abrazohealth.com/our-locations/abrazo-scottsdale-campus
- Lists: Hospitals in Arizona

Abrazo Scottsdale Campus (formerly Paradise Valley Hospital) is an acute care hospital located in Phoenix, Arizona, in the United States. Abrazo Scottsdale Campus offers orthopedic services, sports medicines, rehabilitation services, diagnostic imaging, surgical weight loss procedures, women's health services, da Vinci Surgical System, and 24-hour emergency care.

== History ==
Paradise Valley Hospital opened in 1983. It was formerly part of Columbia/HCA, before being spun off as part of Triad Hospitals in 1999. In 2001, Vanguard Health Systems purchased Paradise Valley Hospital from Triad. In 2003, Vanguard established Abrazo Health Care as its Arizona subsidiary. Abrazo is the second largest health care delivery system in Arizona, United States. Abrazo Health Care is located in Phoenix, Arizona. In 2013, Vanguard was acquired by Tenet Healthcare.

== Accreditations and recognition ==
Below are some accreditations given to the hospital by notable organisations.

- Accredited Chest Pain Center by The Society of Chest Pain Centers
- Accredited by the Joint Commission (JCAHO)
- Named Top Performers on Key Quality Measures by The Joint Commission
- Recognized as ‘Best’ in Arizona (2013, 2014) - Public opinion poll from the Annual Ranking Arizona Magazine's ‘Best of Arizona’. Paradise Valley Hospital - #1 Acute Care Hospital in Arizona
