= Abrazo Arizona Heart Hospital =

- Tenet Healthcare

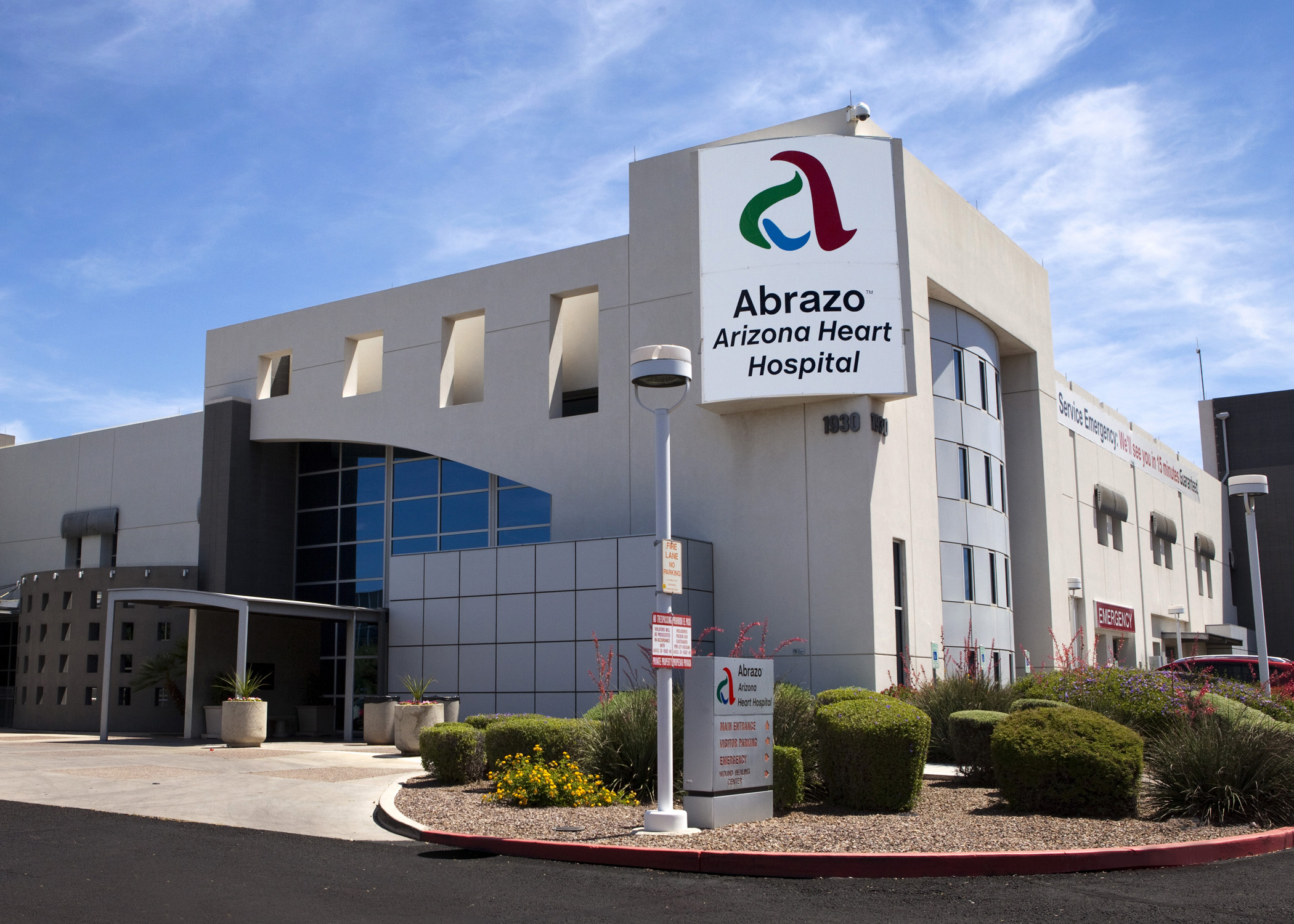

Geography
- Location: 1930 East Thomas Road, Phoenix, Arizona, United States
- Coordinates: 33.4810648°N 112.039606°W

Organization
- Type: Private

History
- Opened: 1998

Links
- Website: www.abrazohealth.com
- Lists: Hospitals in Arizona

Abrazo Arizona Heart Hospital is a privately owned hospital in Phoenix, Arizona, United States.

== History ==
It was founded in 1981 by Edward Diethrich, and in 2010, it was purchased by Abrazo Community Health Network, a subsidiary of Vanguard Health Systems. The hospital was accredited by The Society of Chest Pain Centers and was mentioned in the 2008 Reuters 100 Top Hospitals for Cardiovascular Care In 2013, Vanguard was acquired by Tenet Healthcare.
