= Abrazo West Campus =

Coordinates: 33.461633°N 112.353402°W

- Abrazo Community Health Network

Geography
- Location: 13677 West McDowell Road, Goodyear, Arizona, United States

Organization
- Type: General hospital

Services
- Emergency department: Level I trauma center
- Beds: 179

History
- Founded: 2003

Links
- Website: www.abrazohealth.com/our-locations/abrazo-west-campus
- Lists: Hospitals in Arizona

Abrazo West Campus is an acute-care community hospital located in Goodyear, Arizona, United States. Abrazo West is part of the Abrazo Community Health Network chain of hospitals and is designated by the American College of Surgeons and the state of Arizona as a Level 1 Trauma Center. The hospital receives approximately 55,000 emergency patients annually.

== Services ==
- 179 total staffed beds
- Orthopedics
- Stroke care
- Wound care
- 24-hour Emergency care services

== Abrazo Buckeye Emergency Center ==
Abrazo Buckeye Emergency Center (formerly West Valley Emergency Center) is a 14-bed emergency center located in Buckeye, Arizona. The Emergency Center is operated and staffed by Abrazo West Campus. Operated by Abrazo West Campus, this comprehensive emergency facility is located in Buckeye and staffed by board-certified emergency physicians and specialty-certified nurses who provide 24-hour care. The facility offers CT scans, ultrasound and other diagnostic imaging services, and an on-site laboratory.

== See also ==
- Tenet Healthcare
