= Abrazo Community Health Network =

Health care delivery system

- Type: Subsidiary
- Industry: Health Care
- Founded: 2003
- Headquarters: Phoenix, Arizona, United States
- Key people: Frank Molinaro, Market Chief Executive Officer
- Products: Acute care hospitals and emergency centers, health care services, emergency room services, urgent care services and medical group primary care facilities
- Number of employees: 5,200
- Parent: Tenet Healthcare
- Website: www.abrazohealth.com/

Abrazo Community Health Network (Abrazo Health) is one of the largest health care delivery system in Arizona, United States. Abrazo Community Health Network is located in Phoenix, Arizona and was established in 2003. The Abrazo system comprises five acute care hospitals including one cardiovascular-specialty hospital. The health care system offers a broad range of medical services, including cardiology, internal medicine, general surgery, orthopedics, neurology, obstetrics, bariatric, oncology, women's health, diagnostic imaging, acute inpatient rehabilitation, outpatient rehabilitation, outpatient services, Level 1 Trauma Center and emergency care. In addition to the hospitals, Abrazo Community Health Network includes primary and specialty care physician offices, urgent care offices and emergency centers.

== History ==
Abrazo Community Health Network is part of Tenet Healthcare. Tenet Healthcare Corporation owns and operates 475 ambulatory surgery centers and surgical hospitals, and 61 hospitals in 47 states. Headquartered in downtown Dallas, Texas. Tenet has more than 100,000 employees.

Abrazo Community Health Network includes five acute-care hospitals, including one cardiovascular-specialty hospital and two stand-alone emergency centers, offering 785 licensed beds.

- Abrazo Arizona Heart Hospital, formerly Arizona Heart Hospital (acquired 2010)
- Abrazo Arrowhead Campus, formerly Arrowhead Campus (acquired 1999)
- Abrazo Buckeye Emergency Center, formerly West Valley Emergency Center (opened 2011)
- Abrazo Central Campus, formerly Phoenix Baptist Hospital (acquired 1999)
- Abrazo Peoria Emergency Center, formerly North Peoria Emergency Center
- Abrazo Scottsdale Campus, formerly Paradise Valley Hospital (acquired 2001)
- Abrazo West Campus, formerly West Valley Hospital (opened 2003)

On May 28, 2015, it was announced that Abrazo Health had renamed Abrazo Community Health Network.

== Accreditation ==
- Abrazo Community Health Network hospitals are accredited by the Joint Commission Joint Commission
- Abrazo Arizona Heart Institute designated Aetna Aexcel Designation for clinical performance
- Abrazo Arrowhead Campus (Arrowhead Hospital) designated as a Primary Stroke Center by the American Stroke Association
- Abrazo Arrowhead Campus (Arrowhead Hospital) designated a United Health Premium Total Joint Replacement Program
- Abrazo Arrowhead Campus (Arrowhead Hospital) and Abrazo West Campus (West Valley Hospital) received the Blue Distinction Center for Knee and Hip Replacement by BlueCross BlueShield Association
- Abrazo Central Campus (Phoenix Baptist Hospital) and Abrazo West Campus (West Valley Hospital) designated as Joint Commission certified Primary Stroke Centers
- The Society of Chest Pain Centers has granted the designation of Accredited Chest Pain Center to all six hospitals in the Abrazo Community Health Network: Abrazo Arrowhead Campus (Arrowhead Hospital), Abrazo Scottsdale Campus (Paradise Valley Hospital) (Arizona), Abrazo Central Campus (Phoenix Baptist Hospital) and Abrazo West Campus (West Valley Hospital)

== Affiliations ==
- Abrazo Community Health Network is a member of the Health System Alliance of Arizona and Arizona Care Network

== Awards and recognition ==
- Abrazo Arizona Heart Institute (Arizona Heart Institute) recognized as 'Best' in Arizona (2013, 2014) - Public opinion poll from the Annual Ranking Arizona Magazine's 'Best of Arizona'. Arizona Heart Institute - #1 for Cardiology in Arizona
- Abrazo Arizona Heart Hospital (Arizona Heart Hospital) awarded Reuters Top 100 Hospitals for Cardiovascular Care
- Abrazo Arrowhead Campus (Arrowhead Hospital) received the 3 Star Rating" by the Society of Thoracic Surgeons (STS)
- Abrazo Arrowhead Campus (Arrowhead Hospital) received the Beacon Award winner for Critical Care Excellence by the American Association of Critical-Care Nurses
- Abrazo Arrowhead Campus (Arrowhead Hospital) received the Best Acute Care Hospital Award by Total Benchmark Solution
- Abrazo Arrowhead Campus (Arrowhead Hospital) is the recipient of the Top 100 Hospital" by Thomson Reuters® (formally known as Solucient)
- Abrazo Arrowhead Campus (Arrowhead Hospital) recognized as U.S. News & World Report Best Hospital in Phoenix, recognized for Ear, Nose and Throat care specialty
- Abrazo Arrowhead Campus (Arrowhead Hospital) received Hospital Value Index Award for best in value, quality, efficiency, affordability, satisfaction, best in region, best in state, best in market
- Abrazo Arrowhead Campus (Arrowhead Hospital), Abrazo Central Campus (Phoenix Baptist Hospital) and Abrazo West Campus (West Valley Hospital) - Get With The Guidelines 2013 Award - Stroke care - American Heart Association and American Stroke Association
- Abrazo Arrowhead Campus (Arrowhead Hospital) received Arizona Quality Alliance Award
- Abrazo Arrowhead Campus (Arrowhead Hospital) received the Blue Distinction Center+ Award from Blue Cross Blue Shield of Arizona for Cardiac Care (2013, 2012).
- Abrazo Scottsdale Campus (Paradise Valley Hospital) recognized as 'Best' in Arizona (2013, 2014) - Public opinion poll from the Annual Ranking Arizona Magazine's 'Best of Arizona'. Paradise Valley Hospital - #1 Acute Care Hospital in Arizona
- Abrazo Scottsdale Campus (Paradise Valley Hospital) received Top Improver Award for Patient Satisfaction by Press Ganey
- Abrazo West Campus (West Valley Hospital) awarded Women's Choice Award 2014 America's Best Hospitals for Emergency Care
