= Society of Chest Pain Centers =

Non-profit organization for cardiovascular disease

The Society of Cardiovascular Patient Care (previously the Society of Chest Pain Centers) (SCPC) is an international nonprofit organization committed to eradicating heart disease as the number one cause of death worldwide. In January 2016, the organization merged with the American College of Cardiology. The Society of Cardiovascular Patient Care focuses on transforming cardiovascular care by assisting facilities in their effort to create communities of excellence that bring together quality, cost and patient satisfaction. As the only cross-specialty organization, SCPC provides the support needed for individual hospitals and hospital systems to effectively bridge existing gaps in treatment by providing the tools, education and support necessary to successfully navigate the changing face of healthcare. It is headquartered in Dublin, Ohio. Through disease management and accreditation processes, SCPC is "Taking Science to the Bedside.”

== History ==
The concept of creating a chest pain center (CPC) in every hospital was presented in the late 1980s as a strategy to significantly reduce heart attack deaths through the rapid treatment of patients with acute myocardial infarction. In 1981, the first CPC was started in the emergency department at St. Agnes HealthCare Hospital in Baltimore, Maryland. This area of the emergency department was originally called the Chest Pain Emergency Room and later changed to Chest Pain Centers in Emergency Departments. By 1988, St. Agnes was able to track the creation of more than 2000 Chest Pain Centers in Emergency Departments throughout the United States.

In 1993, the First Congress of Chest Pain Centers was held in Savannah, Georgia.

In February 1997, Reader's Digest publishes the article, He Declared War on Heart Attacks on Early Heart Attack Care as championed by Dr. Raymond Bahr, a cardiologist at St. Agnes, in order to prevent untimely deaths by heart attacks.

In 1998, The Society of Chest Pain Centers was created as a new medical society in order to further develop CPCs and the mission was to reduce heart attack deaths by placing emphasis on Early Heart Attack Care (EHAC).

In 2000, the growth of the CPC was almost halted when the Health Care Finance Administration (HCFA) created a new policy that observation services in the emergency department were not going to be reimbursed. The Society of Chest Pain Centers and the American College of Cardiology (ACC), American Heart Association (AHA), American Medical Association (AMA), American College of Physicians (ACP) and the American Society of Nuclear Cardiology (ASNC) met with the HCFA in order to petition to have this rule overturned and, in 2001, they were successful. After the ruling was reversed, HCFA administrators requested additional information in order to discern “Accredited” facilities from those that used this phrase as a marketing term.

=== Implementation of Accreditation Process ===
In 2001, the Society of Chest Pain Centers established an accreditation committee to set up an Accreditation Process of Improvement for Hospitals with Chest Pain Centers. The Accreditation Process was based on the “Eight Key Elements of a Chest Pain Center” previously published in the American Journal of Cardiology.

The Eight Key Elements include

- Community Education and Early Heart Attack Care
- Emergency Department Integration with the EMS
- Emergency Assessment of Patients with Symptoms of ACS – Timely Diagnosis and Treatment of ACS
- Assessment of Patients with Low Risk for ACS and No Assignable Cause for Their Symptoms
- Process Improvement
- Personnel, Competencies and Training
- Organizational Structure and Commitment
- Functional Facility Design

After a hospital becomes accredited, the process cycle for improvement must be documented every three years in order to maintain active accreditation status. The Society of Chest Pain Centers process improvement accreditation and certification programs include:

- Chest Pain Center Accreditation
- Heart Failure Accreditation
- Atrial Fibrillation (AFib) Accreditation
- Certified Chest Pain Coordinator Program

As of March 18, 2015, the Society of Cardiovascular Patient Care has granted 1,026 Chest Pain Center, Atrial Fibrillation, or Heart Failure Accreditations.

== Early Heart Attack Care and Community Education ==
In addition to accreditation and process improvement for hospitals, the Society of Cardiovascular Patient Care utilizes outreach communication to inform the medical community and the community at large about Early Heart Attack Care (EHAC). Developed in 1985, this education is shared worldwide to help people recognize the early signs in order to prevent a heart attack from occurring in themselves or others. In the event of a heart attack, early detection can also prevent extensive damage to the affected heart muscle. Early Heart Attack Care education identifies the early symptoms of a heart attack so that people can receive medical care as soon as possible. Symptoms can include:

- Mild chest pressure, squeezing or discomfort
- Nausea
- Pain that travels down one or both arms
- Jaw pain
- Fatigue
- Anxiety
- Back pain
- Shortness of breath
- Feeling of fullness

The EHAC initiative originally started in 1985 at St. Agnes Hospital. As part of this initiative to educate the medical community and the community at large, the initiative includes a web-based tool called Deputy Heart Attack. Deputy Heart Attack provides an educational course on spotting a heart attack and providing the timely medical care. After the course and a small test, a person who successfully passes the course becomes “Deputized” in EHAC. [Link] As part of the deputizing process, the user must adhere to the EHAC Oath, “I understand that heart attacks have beginnings and, on occasion, signs of an impending heart attack may include chest discomfort, shortness of breath, shoulder and/or arm pain, and weakness. These may occur hours or weeks before the actual heart attack. I solemnly swear that if it happens to me or anyone I know, I will call 9-1-1 or activate our Emergency Medical Services.”

In May 2012, SCPC expands educational resources to the public at large by releasing BestHeartHospital App for Apple and Android platforms that can be downloaded directly to a phone, tablet or computer. This app allows patients to view accredited facilities in their area.

As of June 27, 2012, 4998 people have taken the EHAC Oath. As of February 22, 2015, 375,323 people have taken the EHAC Oath.
