= Michael Goodwin (architect) =

Arizona architect, state representative (1939–2011)

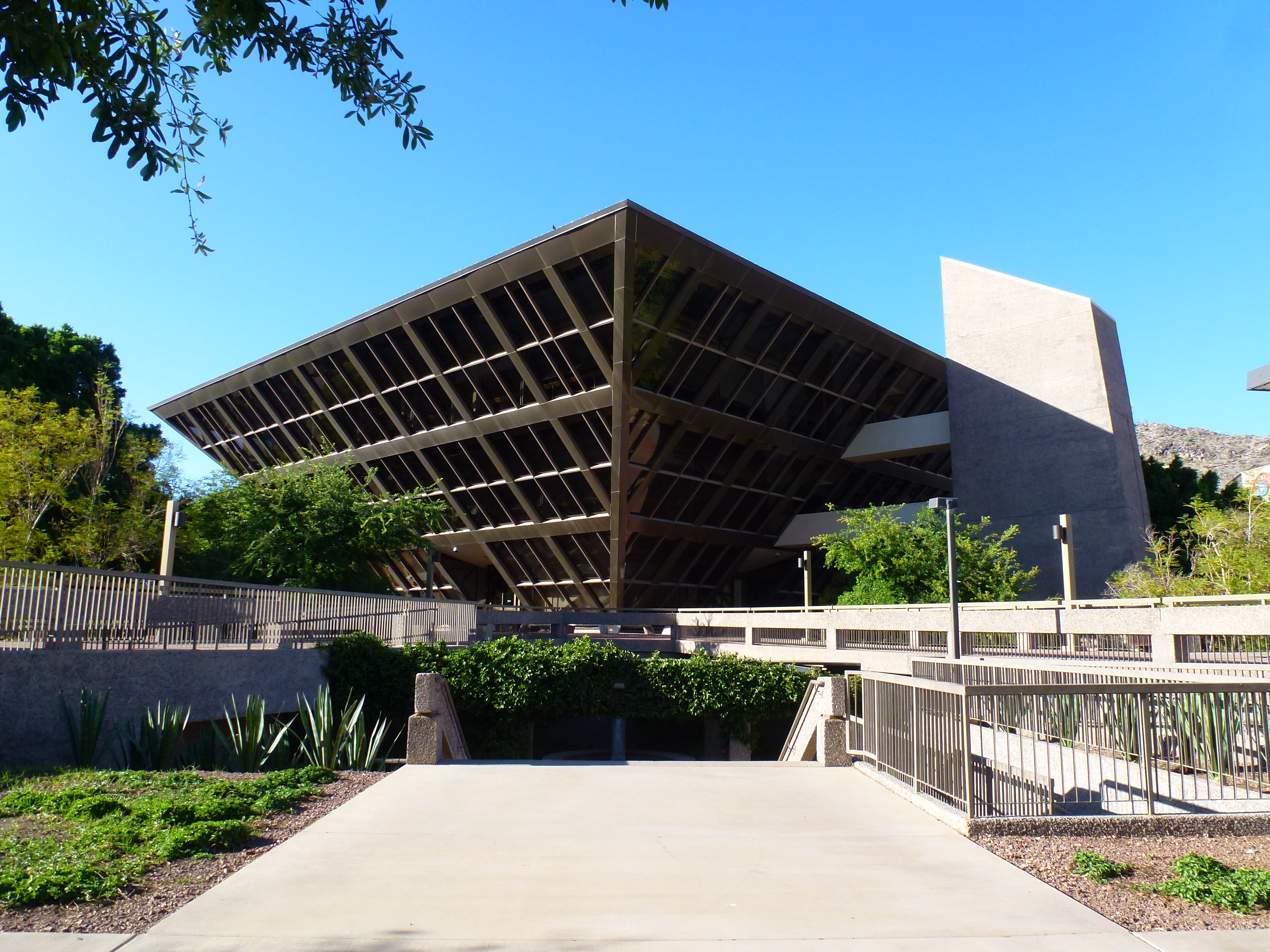
- Tempe Municipal Building, 1970
- Born: April 28, 1939; Tempe, Arizona
- Died: May 4, 2011 (aged 72); Arizona
- Education: University of Southern California
- Occupation: Architect
- Spouse(s): Joan c. Robison (1962-1993), SAM (m. 2006–2011)
- Children: 2, Matthew Goodwin and Lisa (Goodwin) Michael
- Parent(s): Kemper Goodwin, Mickey Goodwin
- Awards: Arizona Architects Medal
- Practice: Michael & Kemper Goodwin Ltd., Ahern, MacVittie, Hofmann & Goodwin Ltd.
- Buildings: Tempe Municipal Building, Marcos de Niza High School, Corona del Sol High School, Horizon High School

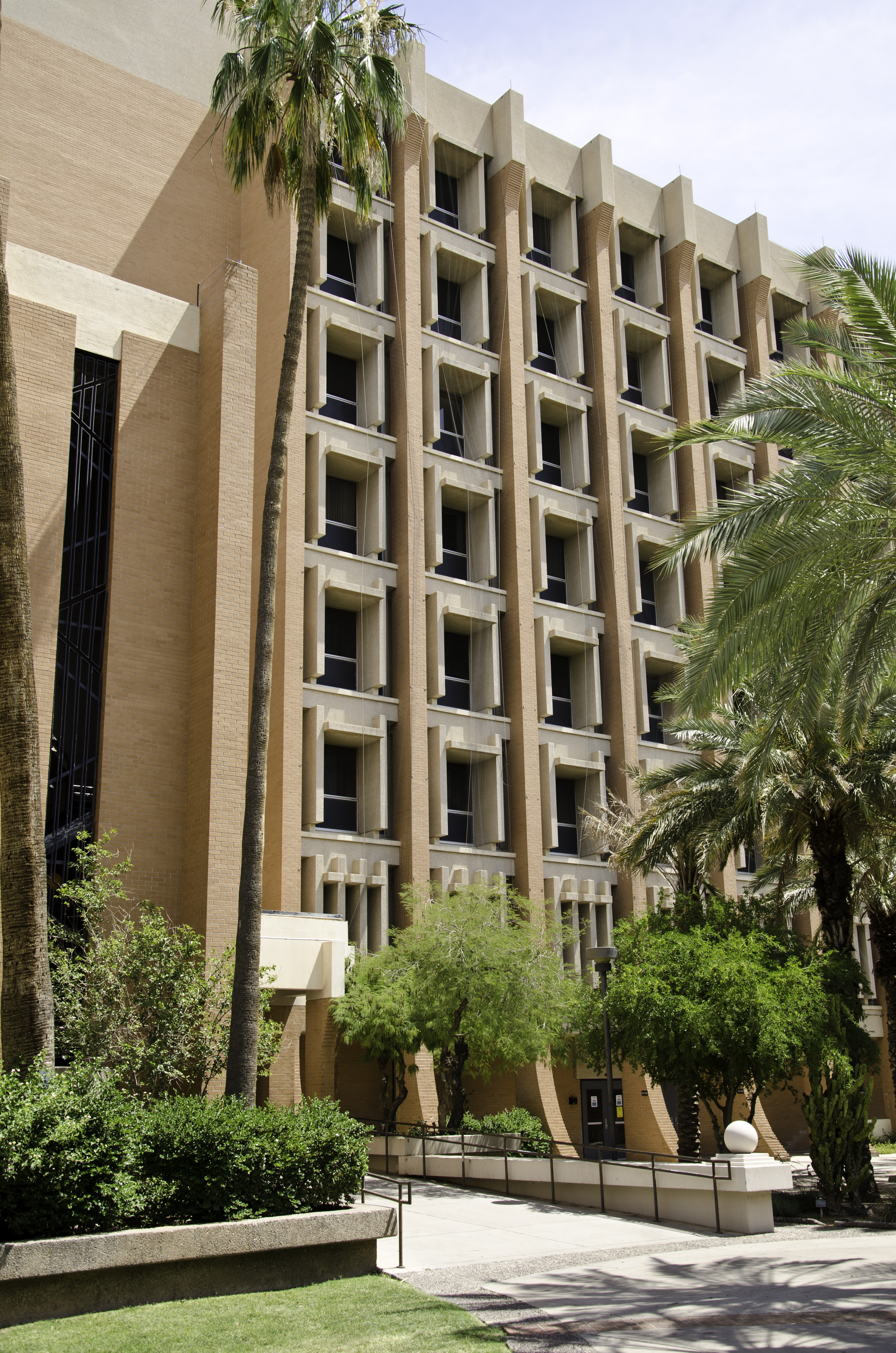
Mathematics Building at ASU was Michael's first major design.

Michael Kemper Goodwin (April 28, 1939 – May 4, 2011) was an architect and politician in the Phoenix, Arizona, area. He also served two terms in the Arizona House of Representatives in the 1970s.

== Life and career ==
Goodwin was born April 28, 1939, to Kemper Goodwin and Mary 'Mickey' Goodwin. (Kemper Goodwin was a local architect, who designed two buildings which are now on the National Register of Historic Places in Arizona). He attended the University of Southern California graduating in 1963.

After graduation, Goodwin returned to Arizona and joined his father's firm. In 1966, he received his license in architecture and was made senior partner. The firm then became known as Michael & Kemper Goodwin Ltd. He took over the firm after his father retired in 1975. In 1978, he was the youngest person ever to become a Fellow of the American Institute of Architects.

In 1969 Goodwin ran for his districts seat in the Arizona House of Representatives on the Republican ticket. He would go on to serve two terms in the House. In 1975 he ran for Secretary of State which he lost by a narrow margin to Wesley Bolin. Goodwin did all this while still maintaining his career as an architect.

His firm specialized in educational structures designing facilities for several school districts throughout Arizona. Many of these schools are still in use, however several have been demolished and replaced with new campuses.

He was also one of the first architects to experiment in green and sustainable building designs as well as efficiency of building design as seen in many of his educational and municipal buildings. Examples of his sustainable and efficiency ideas include the use of sloping glass, earth berms, solar energy, hexagonal structures framed in as parallelograms, light and body heat as heat sources, modular portable building elements, and rooftop parking.

In 1981 Goodwin and his family moved to Flagstaff, Arizona, at this time Goodwin began to phase himself out of architecture to represent this the firm was reorganized into Ahern, MacVittie, Hofmann & Goodwin, Ltd. Ultimately Goodwin's name would be dropped and Ahern, MacVittie & Hofmann Ltd. would go on to design many more schools. He would however involve himself in real estate as a developer and keep the name Michael & Kemper Goodwin Ltd. when developing the Elks Run subdivision in Flagstaff. In 1995 Michael returned to Phoenix living in an adobe home on Camelback Mountain.

Goodwin died of pulmonary fibrosis on May 4, 2011, at the age of 72.

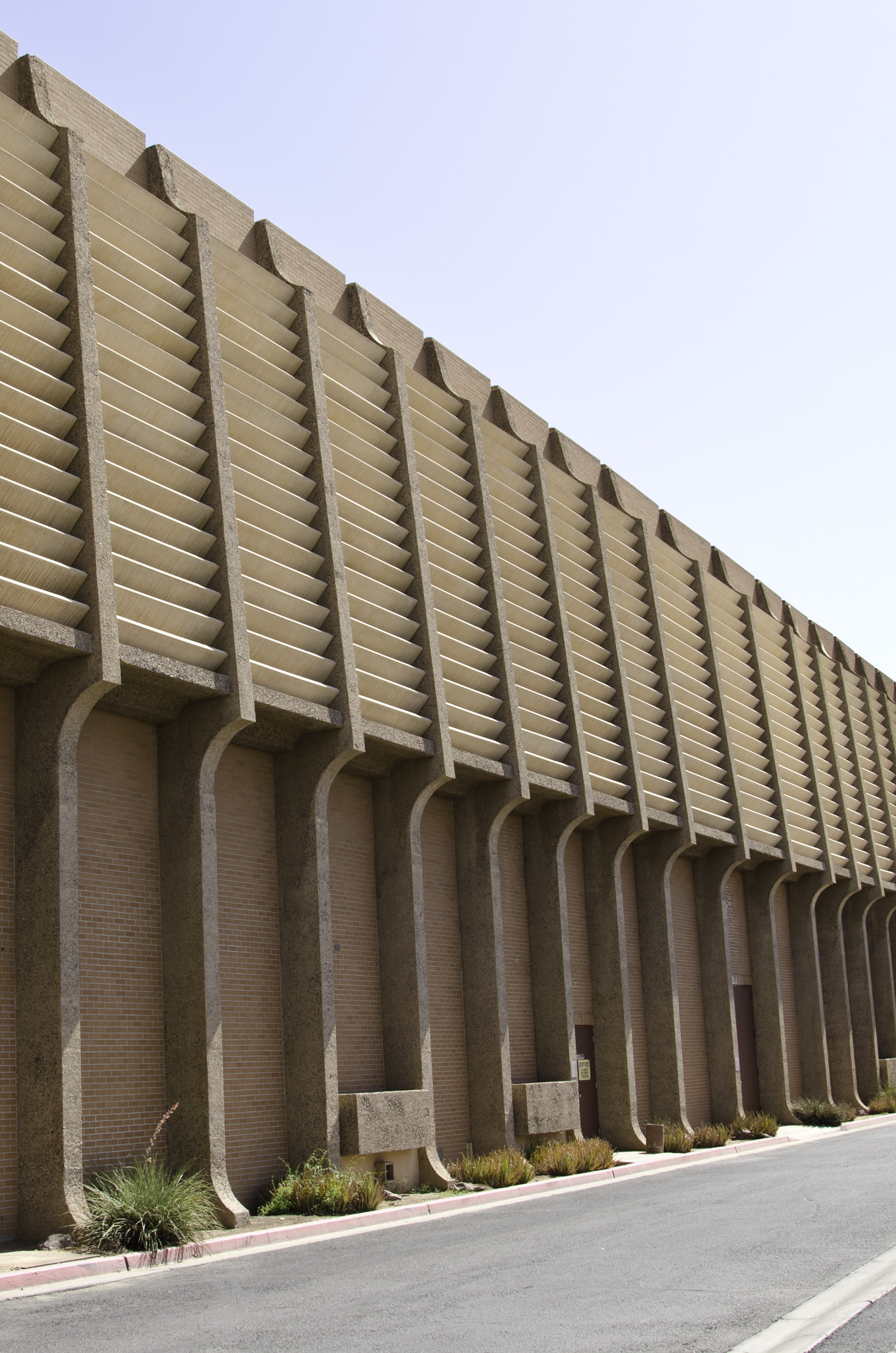
Central Boiler Plant, ASU

== Major works ==
- Salt River Project Building, Tempe, Arizona (1966–1968 with Kemper Goodwin)
- Michael Goodwin Residence, Tempe, Arizona (1968–1969)
- Tempe Municipal Building (1966–1970 with Kemper Goodwin): this upside-down pyramid was designed to shade and cool itself
- Omaha Dome, Creighton University, Omaha, Nebraska (1968 unbuilt)
- Tempe Chamber of Commerce, Tempe, Arizona, (1970 unbuilt)
- Arizona Highway Employees Credit Union, Phoenix, Arizona (1971 with Kemper Goodwin)
- Paradise Valley Town Hall (1971–1975): the low slung earth berm surrounded building reflects the residential image of the town
- Scottsdale Medical Pavilion, Scottsdale, Arizona (1972–1976): wedge-shaped structure that uses roof of below floor as access to the above space
- First Federal Building, Tempe, Arizona (1973 unbuilt): used earth berms and innovative idea of rooftop parking
- Maricopa County Warehouse, Phoenix, Arizona (1974)
- Mercury Mine Bridge, Phoenix, Arizona (1975)
- St. Michael's Episcopal Church, Coolidge, Arizona (1976)
- Mill Avenue Shops, Tempe, Arizona (1977–1978): Goodwin advocated for the red brick sidewalks that are a pivotal part of the buildings character
- United Bank Building, Tempe, Arizona (1980 unbuilt)
- Paradise Valley Police Station (1980)
- Garden Showcase Apartments (now MarQ at 1st) Tempe, Arizona (1984)
- The Elk Run subdivision in Flagstaff, Arizona, among his few residential designs
- Yavapai County Health Building, Prescott, Arizona (1986): built using Goodwin's Sweet Little Unit (SLU) steel framed portable building system (Demolished)
- United States Post Office, Kayenta, Arizona (1988)
- United States Post Office, Prescott, Arizona (1989)

=== Schools ===
Arizona State University

- Central Boiler Plant (1967 with Kemper Goodwin)
- Mathematics Building (now Wexler Hall) (1965–1968 with Kemper Goodwin)
- Bateman Physical Sciences Center (Physics and Geology Facility) (1973–1975)
- Bateman Physical Sciences Center (Chemistry Stores Building) (1979)
- Bateman Physical Sciences Center (Advanced Chemistry Building) (1982)

Tempe Union High School District

- Marcos de Niza High School (1971 with Kemper Goodwin): this work was considered a revolution in open space campus design
- Corona del Sol High School (1976): a very early design in solar technology
- Addition to McClintock High School (1976)

Tempe Elementary School District

- Evans Elementary School (1965 with Kemper Goodwin)
- Hudson Elementary School (1967 with Kemper Goodwin)
- Scales Elementary School (1968) (Demolished)
- Curry Elementary School (1968–1969)
- Connolly Middle School (1969–1972)
- Arredondo Elementary School (1972 with Kemper Goodwin)
- Frank Elementary School, Ronaldo & Elena Sanchez Activity Center (1973–1975) (demolished)
- Nevitt Elementary School (1974): hexagonal-shaped structures to form parallelogram-shaped classrooms (Demolished)
- Bustoz Elementary School (1974): hexagonal-shaped structures to form parallelogram-shaped classrooms (now Bustoz Learning Center)
- Rover Elementary School (1976)
- Getz School (1979)

Kyrene School District

- Kyrene del Norte Elementary School (1973): hexagonal-shaped structures form parallelogram-shaped classrooms
- Addition to C. I. Waggoner Elementary School (1975)
- Kyrene de las Lomas Elementary School (1976) (Demolished)

Paradise Valley Unified School District

- Shea Middle School (1969–1971): Goodwin's first example of earth berms (Demolished)
- Indian Bend Elementary School (1972 with Kemper Goodwin)
- Desert Shadows Elementary School (1972 with Kemper Goodwin)
- Aerrowhead Elementary School (1973–1974): Goodwin's first example of hexagonal-shaped structures that form parallelogram-shaped classrooms
- Desert Shadows Middle School (1974)
- Mercury Mine Elementary School (1976)
- Liberty Elementary School (1976–1977): used light and body heat as a heat supply (Demolished)
- Additions to Paradise Valley High School (1976–1979)
- Multi-use Building Addition at Campo Bello Elementary School (1976)
- Multi-use Building Addition at Larkspur Elementary School (1978)
- Paradise Valley Portable Elementary Schools (1978–1979): Goodwin called it the "sweet little unit" (SLU) portable steel framed classrooms which were able to be expanded vertically or horizontally built around a permanent core. Aire Libre, Desert Springs, Sandpiper and Sweetwater Elementary Schools among others.
- Horizon High School (1978–1980): initial plan called for SLU method to be used, final product was a permanent structure of masonry, steel, and concrete with earth berms
- Sunrise Middle School (1980–1981): classroom buildings built using SLU method

Roosevelt Elementary School District

- Cafeteria addition at M.L. King Elementary School (1975)
- Auditorium addition at C.J. Jorgensen Elementary School (1975)
- C.O. Greenfield Elementary/Middle School (1977–1980)

Scottsdale Unified School District

- Cherokee Elementary School (1973–1974): hexagonal-shaped structures form parallelogram-shaped classrooms (Demolished)

Many other local elementary, middle, and high schools

- Safford High School, Safford, Arizona (1978–1981)
- Nogales High School, Nogales, Arizona (1979–1980)
- Morenci Junior/Senior High School, Morenci, Arizona (1979–1984)
