= Mountain Pointe High School =

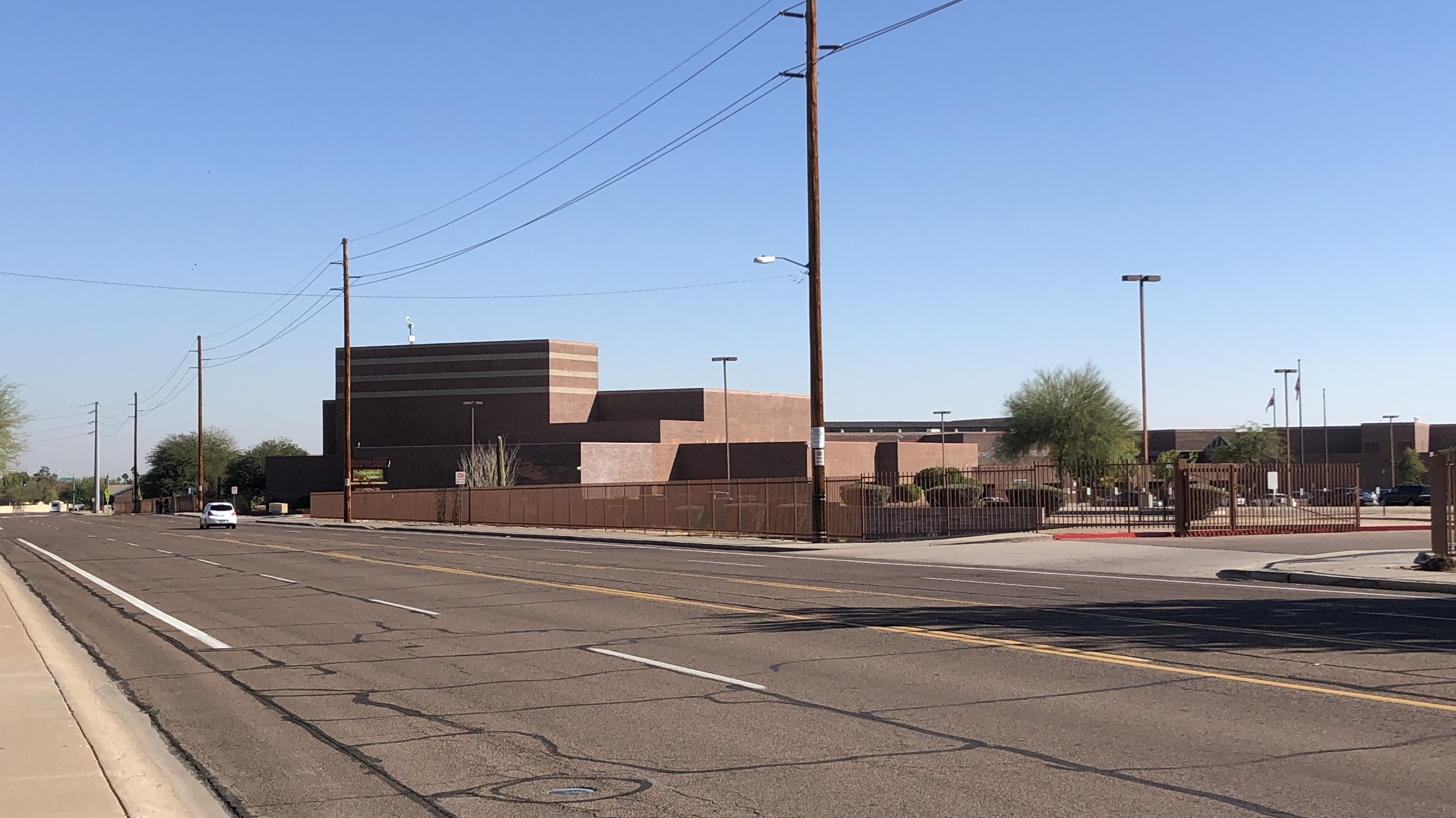
- School Campus

Location
- 4201 E. Knox Road; Phoenix, Arizona 85044; United States; 33.3259°N 111.9906°W

Information
- School type: Public High school
- Motto: Establishing purpose, instilling pride, empowering performance one person at a time.
- Established: 1991
- School district: Tempe Union High School District
- NCES District ID: 0408340
- NCES School ID: 040834001567
- Principal: Tomika Banks
- Staff: 86.60 (FTE)
- Grades: 9–12
- Enrollment: 1,639 (2023-2024)
- Average class size: 32
- Student to teacher ratio: 18.93
- Language: English
- Colors: Maroon and Gold
- Mascot: The Pride (of Lions)
- Website: mountainpointe.tempeunion.org

Mountain Pointe High School is a secondary school located in Ahwatukee, Arizona one of eight public high schools serving the Tempe Union High School District.

== History ==
The Ahwatukee area of Phoenix experienced explosive growth in the 1990s. The Kyrene School District, the elementary school district in the area, opened a string of new schools here at this time, and the Tempe Union High School District followed suit by opening its last two high schools west of I-10. Mountain Pointe was completed by the fall of 1990, but the Tempe Union district could not open it right away due to funding shortfalls. The new, US$27 million facility ($63.8 million in 2025 dollars) opened to students the following year. The 1,100 students in grades 9 and 10 that attended the school at its start were asked to pick a mascot: an eagle, thunder, rough riders or a pride of lions, which won out. Its rival Desert Vista High School was opened to serve the growing southwestern part of Ahwatukee in 1996. Prior to Mountain Pointe's opening, Ahwatukee was part of the service areas of Corona del Sol High School (five miles away from Mountain Pointe and east of the Interstate 10 freeway) and Tempe High School. In the spring of 1994, Mountain Pointe graduated its first graduating class.

Mountain Pointe is the largest high school in Ahwatukee with open boundaries. Many people who live in the 85044 zip code attend Mountain Pointe along with commuters from the South Mountain area. There also are a great number of students from the Maricopa area that attend Mountain Pointe High School. The Tempe Union High School District, which had to redraw boundaries significantly in the early 2000s as Corona del Sol grew over its capacity, also includes significant portions of west Chandler in Mountain Pointe's boundaries. While Corona has since shrunk in size, the boundary oddities remain. As of 2021, approximately 51 percent of Mountain Pointe students lived outside of the school's boundaries.

== Campus ==
Mountain Pointe is an open boundary school that permits any student to attend. Mountain Pointe enforces a closed-campus policy and has since its inception, in which ninth, tenth, and eleventh graders may not leave campus without an adult checking them out for the day. Seniors are only permitted to leave campus with a special ID which can only be obtained with a signed and notarized parent permission form.

As of the 2009–2010 school year, Mountain Pointe High School now operates on a traditional schedule. This change comes after a ruling in which all six of the Tempe Union district schools did not meet the Arizona standards for required classroom time. The day now consists of five 57 minute classes, one 63 minute homeroom (five extra minutes for announcements), and a 30-minute lunch. A major criticism of traditional schedule is the loss of an academic lab, a 45–minute study hall, which allowed each student to travel to one teacher for extra help. A 40-minute academic lab returned to Mountain Pointe in the fall of 2011.

== Notable alumni ==
- Danny Baugher, football player
- Christian Clark (2024), college football running back for the South Carolina Gamecocks
- Will Claye, triple jumper, won bronze medal in the long jump at 2012 London Olympics
- C. J. Cron, baseball player
- Kevin Cron, baseball player
- Brad Evans, Major League Soccer player
- Mitchell Fraboni, football player
- Scott Kingery (born 1993), Major League Baseball player for the Philadelphia Phillies
- Kiana Ledé, singer, songwriter, actress and pianist
- Alex Lewis (offensive lineman), NFL player for the New York Jets
- Joe Mather, baseball player
- Rachel Melvin, actress on Days of Our Lives
- Cynthia Moreno, 2008 USA Women's Boxing Team, 2008 Women's National Boxing Champion, 2-time Golden Glove medalist, Pan American Games bronze medalist
- DC Pierson, comedian, Derrick Comedy group
- Nicole Powell, WNBA player
- Reid Priddy (1996), volleyball player in 2004, 2008, and 2012 Summer Olympics
- Sara Slattery, distance runner
- Clifford Starks, MMA competitor, in both Bellator and UFC
- Carson Tucker (born 2002), baseball player
- Cole Tucker (born 1996), baseball player
- Markus Wheaton, NFL player
- Zereoue Williams (2021), college football offensive tackle for the Utah Utes

== Athletics ==
Mountain Pointe's athletic teams' accomplishments include 118 region championships, over the course of 20 years with its sports. The athletics program has won the H.A. Hendrickson Award for top Arizona athletic program, as well as Tempe's top athletic program award numerous times.

In 2006, one of their female soccer players, Alexandra Elston, earned the Gatorade Player of the Year award. She won the award attending as a senior.

Mountain Pointe competes in the annual Ahwatukee Bowl, a Friday-night football game against Desert Vista. Previous Ahwatukee Bowls have been nationally televised on ESPNU. Beginning with the 2011 edition, the game is titled the Ahwatukee Memorial Bowl.

The football team won the Division I Arizona State Championship by defeating defending champions Chandler Hamilton 42–19 on November 30, 2013. The team finished the year with a perfect 13–0 record as the number one team in Arizona and ranked in the top 10 of all high school football teams in the United States.

There are many sports offered at Mountain Pointe that includes Freshman, junior varsity, and varsity level for both boys and girls. The offered varsity sports are:

Varsity Boys' Teams

- Fall Sports
  - Football
  - Golf
  - Cross Country
  - Cross Country
  - Swimming/Diving
- Winter Sports
  - Soccer
  - Basketball
  - Wrestling
- Spring Sports
  - Track and field
  - Baseball
  - Volleyball
  - Tennis
  - Club Lacrosse

Varsity Girls' Teams

- Cross Country
- Track and Field
- Softball
- Tennis
- Soccer
- Badminton
- Swimming/Diving
- Volleyball
- Cross Country
- Basketball
- Club Lacrosse
