= Kemper Goodwin =

NRHP-listed Arizona architect (1906–1997)

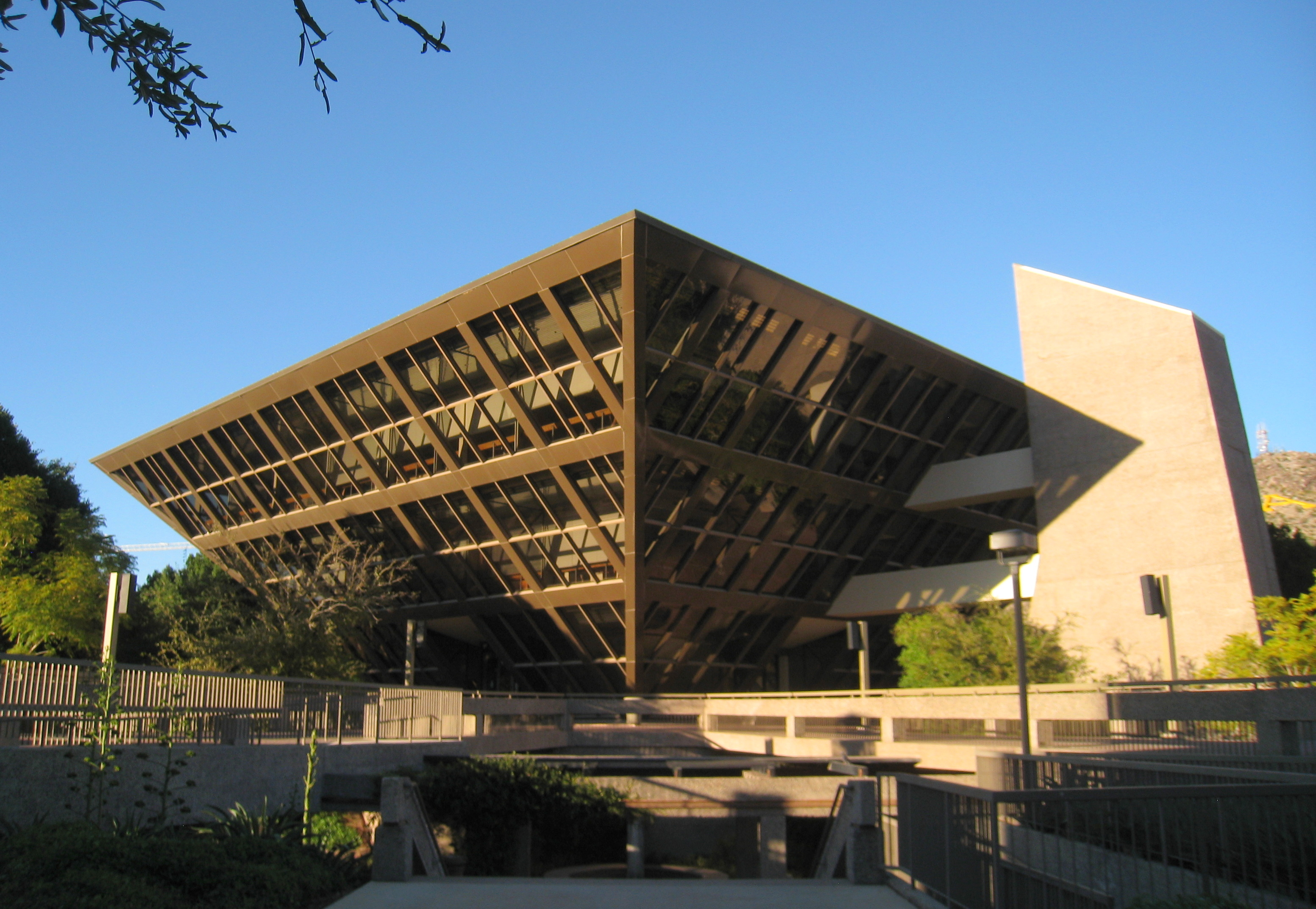
- Tempe Municipal Building
- Born: April 28, 1906; Tempe, Arizona
- Died: December 24, 1997; Tempe, Arizona
- Occupation: Architect
- Spouse: Mickey Goodwin
- Children: MaryHelen, Kathleen and Michael Goodwin
- Practice: Kemper Goodwin F.A.I.A., Michael & Kemper Goodwin Ltd.
- Buildings: Tempe Municipal Building, Mesa Community College, Tempe High School, McClintock High School, Marcos de Niza High School

Kemper Goodwin (April 28, 1906 – December 24, 1997) was a noted architect from Tempe, Arizona. He specialized in educational buildings. Some of his buildings are listed on the National Register of Historic Places in Arizona.

== Life ==
Goodwin was born on April 28, 1906, in Tempe. He attended the University of Southern California, where he received training in architecture. He worked for Lescher & Mahoney and then Del Webb before starting his own firm. His firm was responsible for designing many of the buildings on the Tempe Campus of Arizona State University during the 1950s and 1960s. He designed more than 60 projects for the university which ranged from buildings of great importance to parking lots. He married Mary McGee (Mickey) and had three children; two sisters, MaryHelen and Kathleen, plus Michael, his son who would later go on to work with Kemper in designing important buildings. (Michael joined Kemper's firm in 1966.) Later in his career Kemper would go on to design several schools (many in collaboration with Michael) for the Tempe Union High School, Tempe Elementary, Kyrene, and Paradise Valley Unified School Districts. He retired in 1975 and died on December 24, 1997.

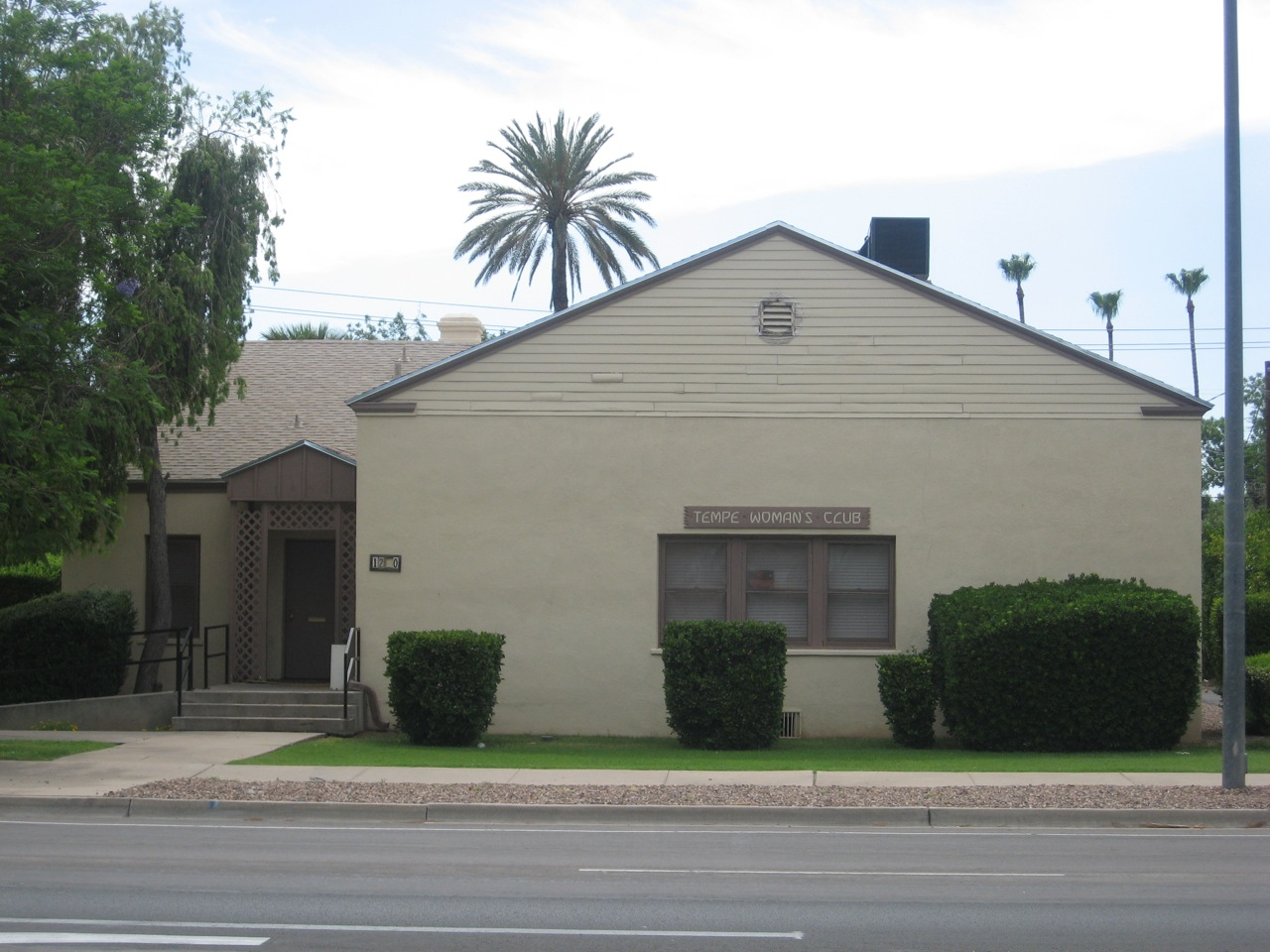
Tempe Woman's Club, 1936

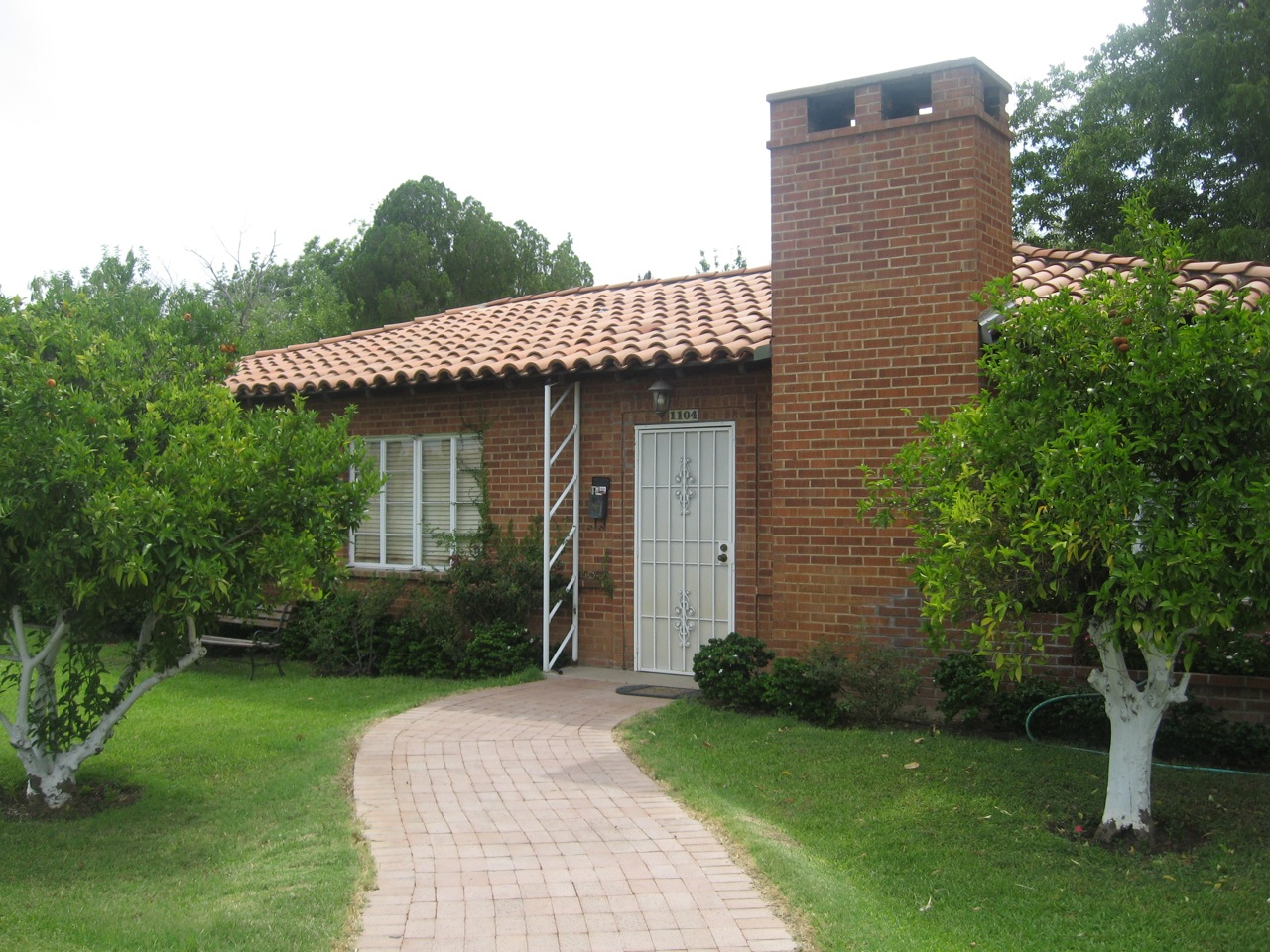
Selleh House, 1940

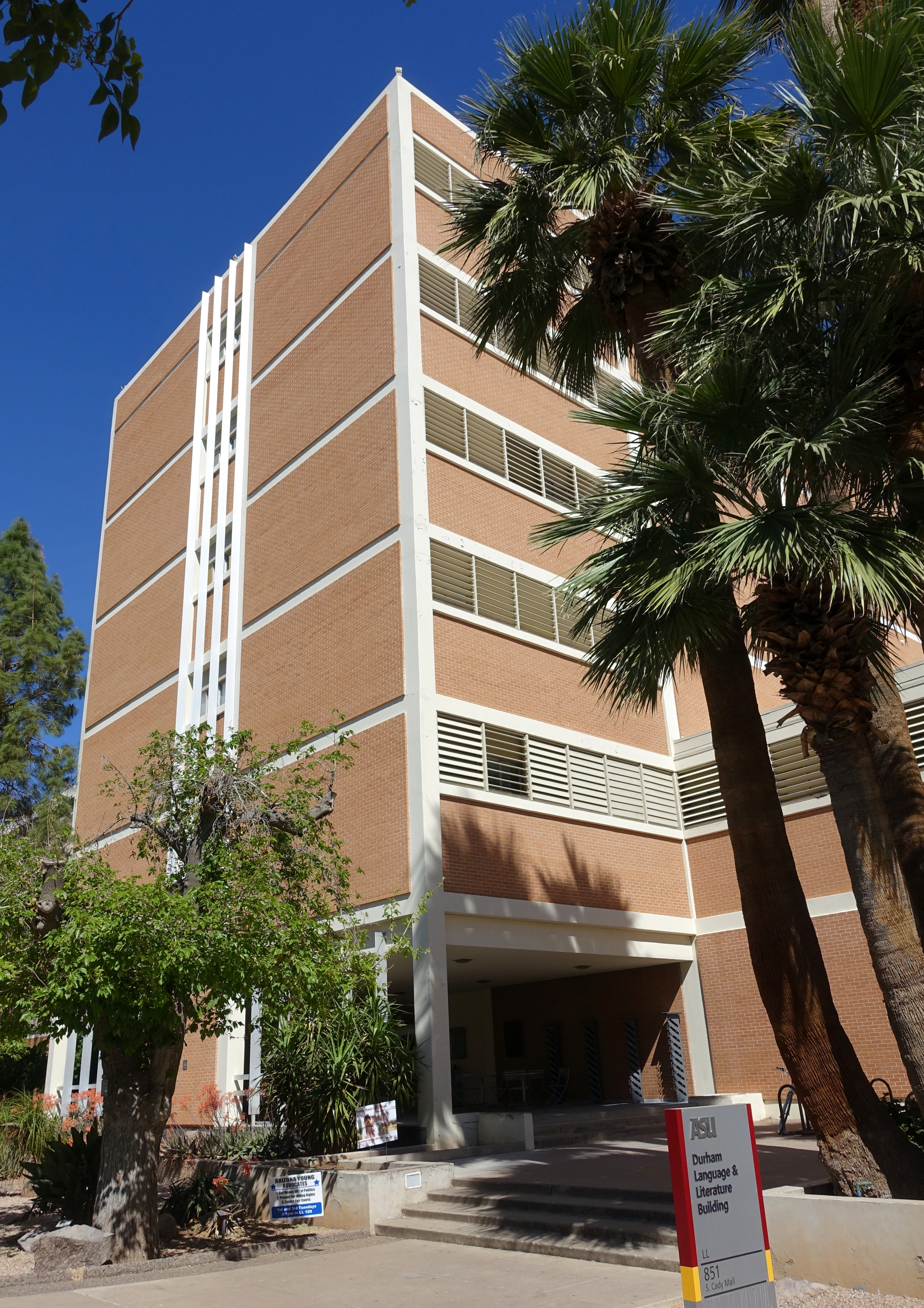
Language and Literature Building, ASU, 1964

== Major works ==
- Additions to the Arizona State Mental Hospital, Phoenix, 1930s (Superintendent for Lescher & Mahoney)
- Williams Air Force Base, Mesa, 1941 (Architectural coordinator for Del Webb)
- Kingman Gunnery School, Kingman, 1942 (Architect for Del Webb)
- The 1953 campus of Tempe High School, Tempe
- Ganado Elementary School, Ganado, 1952–1954
- Tovrea Land & Cattle Company Headquarters and Stockyards Restaurant, Phoenix, 1954
- Globe Junior High School, Globe, 1955
- Valley Presbyterian Church, Paradise Valley, 1960 (with Harold Wagnor)
- Additions to McKemy Middle School, Tempe, 1961
- Additions to Guadalupe School, 1960–1968, Guadalupe (now Frank Elementary School)
- Arizona Tuberculosis Sanitarium, Tempe, 1962–1963 (now ASU Community Services Building)
- Additions to Arizona Country Club, Phoenix, 1964
- McClintock High School, Tempe, 1964
- Laird Elementary School, Tempe, 1964
- Ganado Junior-Senior High School, Guando, 1962–1966
- Addition to Holbrook High School, Holbrook, 1965
- Evans Elementary School, Tempe, 1965 (with Michael Goodwin)
- Mesa Community College, Mesa, 1965-1966 (with Horlbeck-Hickman & Associates)
- Hudson Elementary School, Tempe, 1967 (with Michael Goodwin)
- Salt River Project Building, Tempe, 1966–1968 (with Michael Goodwin)
- Tempe Municipal Building, 1966–1970 (with Michael Goodwin) this upside-down pyramid was designed to shade and cool itself
- Marcos de Niza High School, Tempe, 1971 (with Michael Goodwin)
- Arizona Highway Employees Credit Union, Phoenix, 1971 (with Michael Goodwin)
- Arredondo Elementary School, Tempe, 1972 (with Michael Goodwin)
- Indian Bend Elementary School, Phoenix, 1972 (with Michael Goodwin)
- Desert Shadows Elementary School, Scottsdale, 1972 (with Michael Goodwin)

=== Arizona State University ===
- Men's Gymnasium, 1927 (Superintendent for Lescher & Mahoney)
- West Hall, 1936 (Superintendent for Lescher & Mahoney)
- B. B. Moeur Activity Building, 1936 (Superintendent for Lescher & Mahoney)
- Home Management and Nursery Building, 1939–1940 (Superintendent for Lescher & Mahoney)
- Irish Hall, 1940 (Superintendent for Lescher & Mahoney)
- Goodwin Stadium, 1940–1941 (Superintendent for Lescher & Mahoney) (Demolished)
- Physical Education Building, 1951
- Maintenance Shop Building (later Undergraduate Academic Services Building) 1951 (Demolished)
- Renovation of Mathews Library, 1951
- Renovation of Old Main, 1954
- Infirmary, 1954 (Demolished)
- Memorial Union, 1954–1955
- Wilson Hall, 1956
- Swimming Pool, 1957
- Life Sciences Center, 1957-1959
- Bateman Physical Sciences Building 1957-1959 with expansions through 1968
- The Phi Sigma Kappa House (609 Alpha Drive, Tempe, Arizona) 1961 (demolished)
- Language & Literature Building, 1964
- Mathematics Building (now Wexler Hall) 1965–1968 (with Michael Goodwin)
- Central Boiler Plant (1967 with Michael Goodwin)

=== NRHP-listed structures ===
- Tempe Woman's Club, 1936
- Selleh House, 1940
