= Derek Price =

Derek Price may refer to:

- Derek J. de Solla Price (1922–1983), physicist, historian of science, and information scientist
- Derek Price (American football) (born 1972), American football player
- Derek Price (Fireman Sam), character in Fireman Sam
- Derek Price (judge), judge of the Supreme Court of NSW

== See also ==
- Derek Price/Rod Webster Prize, awarded by the History of Science Society
