= Goodwin Stadium =

ASU sports venue in Tempe, Arizona

Coordinates: 33°24′56″N 111°56′3″W

- Interactive map of Goodwin Stadium
- Location: Tempe, Arizona
- Owner: Arizona State University

Construction
- Groundbreaking: 1935
- Opened: 1936
- Expanded: 1940–1941
- Closed: 1976
- Demolished: 1976–1978
- Cost: $87,500
- Architects: Lescher & Mahoney, Kemper Goodwin
- Structural engineer: L.M. Fitzhugh
- General contractors: Del E. Webb Construction Company, Works Progress Administration

Goodwin Stadium was a stadium in Tempe, Arizona. It hosted the Sun Devils football team until they moved to Sun Devil Stadium in 1958, as well as the team for local Tempe High School until 1969. The stadium held 15,000 people at its peak and was opened in 1936. The first football game played was on Friday, October 3, 1936, when the Arizona State Teacher's College Bulldogs defeated California Institute of Technology 26–0. The last football game played was on September 20, 1958, when ASU beat Hawaii 47–6 in front of 19,000 fans.

The stadium was named for Garfield A. Goodwin, former mayor of Tempe, member of the Arizona State Teachers College Board of Education and receiver on the 1899 Tempe Normal School football team.

== Construction ==
Goodwin Stadium first hosted the Sun Devils in the 1936 season, after the completion of its west side grandstand. The western portion was a Public Works Administration project, built at a total cost of $92,000. This first grandstand had room for 4,000 spectators. The contractor for Goodwin Stadium was Del E. Webb Construction Company. The engineer for Goodwin Stadium was L.M. Fitzhugh.

The eastern portion was built by the Works Progress Administration in 1940–41. Designed by influential Phoenix architects Lescher & Mahoney (with Kemper Goodwin as one of the project's superintendents), it cost $87,500 to build and seated an additional 5,300. In 1946, to accommodate overwhelming growth in the university, a men's dormitory was added to the grandstand at a cost of $275,000. The dormitory housed 88 men at normal capacity. The East stands also served as Haigler Hall, a men's dormitory. It was named after Charles Haigler, a member of the first football team at Tempe Normal School.

== Martin Luther King address ==
On June 3, 1964, Martin Luther King Jr. delivered an address at Goodwin Stadium, titled "Religious Witness for Human Dignity". The address was not noted in many biographies of King and was only found in 2013, when a woman discovered it along with reels from civil rights leader Lincoln Ragsdale's radio show at a Goodwill store. University president G. Homer Durham, a member of the Church of Jesus Christ of Latter-day Saints (LDS Church), showed progressivism in inviting King to speak at the university, since the LDS Church did not fully recognize racial equality until 1978.

== Demolition and site reuse ==
By the 1970s, Goodwin Stadium had fallen into disuse, while the land it sat on was needed by the university. In 1976, the west side of Goodwin Stadium was knocked down, with the east side following in 1978. A road (Lemon Street) was extended through the property; a parking garage now occupies the southern half of the footprint, while several buildings of the W. P. Carey School of Business were constructed on the site north of the extended Lemon Street. A plaque placed on the northwest corner of the parking garage, at College Avenue and Lemon Street, commemorates Goodwin Stadium's existence.
