= Jim Warne (American football) =

American football player (born 1964)

No. 72
- Position: Tackle

Personal information
- Born: November 27, 1964 (age 61); Phoenix, Arizona, U.S.
- Listed height: 6 ft 7 in (2.01 m)
- Listed weight: 315 lb (143 kg)

Career information
- High school: Tempe (Tempe, Arizona)
- College: Mesa CC (1982); Arizona State (1983–1986)
- NFL draft: 1987: 11th round, 296th overall pick

Career history
- Detroit Lions (1987); New York/New Jersey Knights (1991)

Career NFL statistics
- Games played: 3
- Stats at Pro Football Reference

James E. Warne Jr. (born November 27, 1964) is an American former professional football player who was a tackle for the Detroit Lions of the National Football League (NFL). He played college football for the Arizona State Sun Devils.

Pre-draft measurables
Height	Weight	Arm length	Hand span	40-yard dash	10-yard split	20-yard split	20-yard shuttle	Vertical jump	Broad jump
6 ft 6 1/2 in (1.99 m)	307 lb (139 kg)	35 in (0.89 m)	9 1/2 in (0.24 m)	5.52 s	1.88 s	3.22 s	5.00 s	22.0 in (0.56 m)	7 ft 5 in (2.26 m)
All values from NFL Combine
