= Cole Carlon =

American baseball player (born 2005)

Toronto Blue Jays
- Pitcher
- Born: May 20, 2005 (age 21); Tempe, Arizona, U.S.
- Bats: Left Throws: Left
- Stats at Baseball Reference

Cole Alexander Carlon (born May 20, 2005) is an American baseball pitcher in the Toronto Blue Jays organization. He played college baseball for the Arizona State Sun Devils.

== Amateur career ==
Carlon attended Corona del Sol High School in Tempe, Arizona. As a senior, he went 8–2 with a 1.95 earned run average (ERA) and 90 strikeouts over 61.0 innings. He also hit .375 with five home runs. He committed to his hometown Arizona State University to play college baseball.

As a freshman at Arizona State in 2024, Carlon pitched in 26 games with two starts and went 3–1 with a 7.52 ERA and 34 strikeouts in 40 2/3 innings. As a sophomore in 2025, he appeared in 29 games going 3–1 with a 3.33 ERA and 86 strikeouts in 54 innings. In 2025, he played collegiate summer baseball with the Cotuit Kettleers of the Cape Cod Baseball League. After being a relief pitcher during his first two seasons, Carlon transitioned to becoming the team's ace for his 2026 junior year.

== Professional career ==
Carlon was drafted by the Toronto Blue Jays 39th overall in the 2026 Major League Baseball draft. On July 17, 2026, he signed with Blue Jays for a signing bonus of $2.4 million.
