= Tempe Municipal Building =

Avant-garde styled city hall

Tempe, Arizona Municipal Building
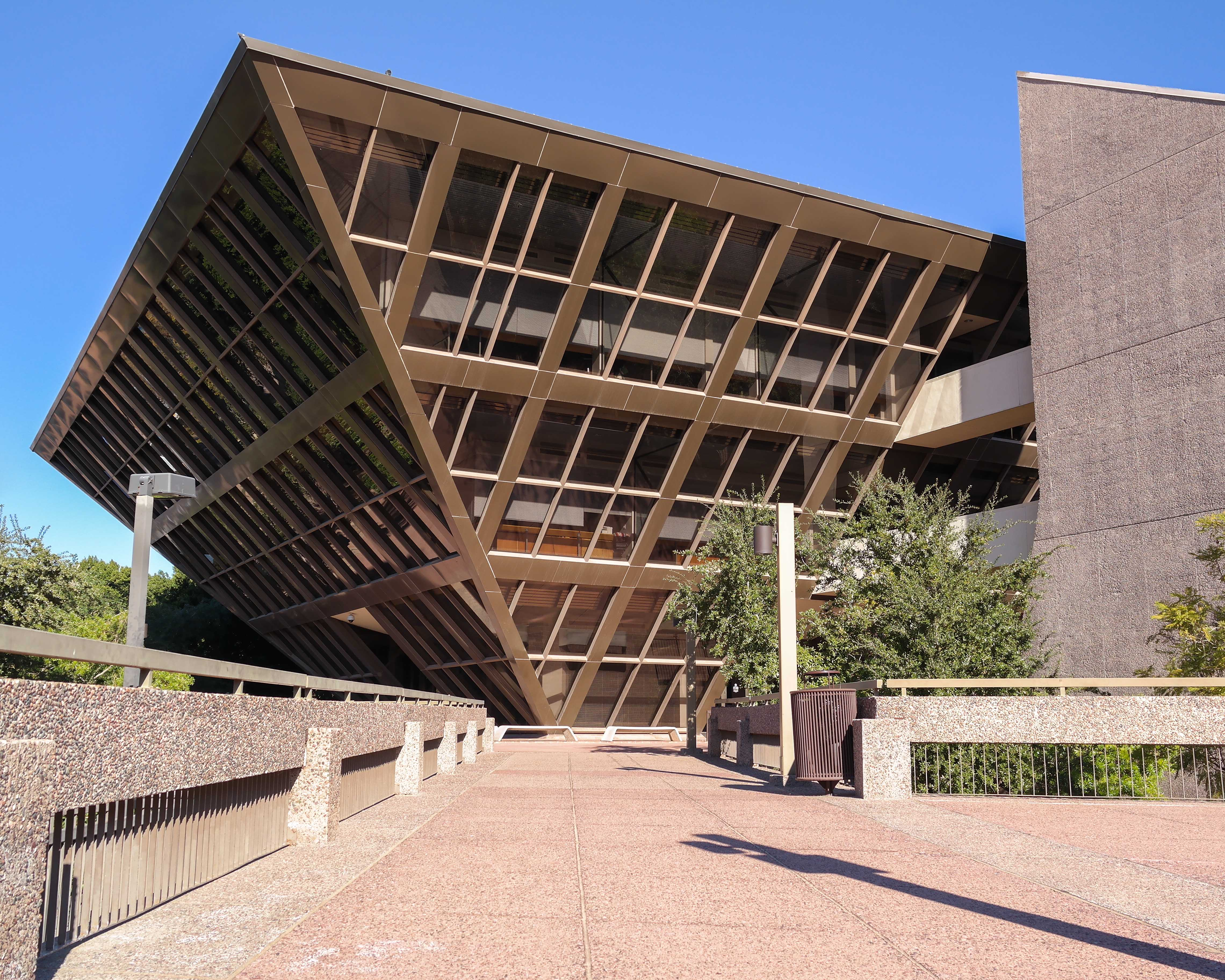

- Location within Arizona

General information
- Type: Inverted pyramid
- Architectural style: Modern
- Location: 31 East 5th Street, Tempe, Arizona, United States
- Coordinates: 33°25′30″N 111°56′19″W
- Construction started: 1969
- Completed: 1971
- Inaugurated: October 2, 1971
- Owner: City of Tempe

Technical details
- Floor count: 3
- Floor area: 17,650 sqft

Design and construction
- Architects: Rolf Osland, Michael Goodwin, Kemper Goodwin
- Architecture firm: Michael & Kemper Goodwin Ltd.
- Structural engineer: Hanlyn, Mann, and Anderson
- Main contractor: M. M. Sundt Construction Company, Phoenix, Arizona

Website
- www.tempe.gov/Home/Components/FacilityDirectory/FacilityDirectory/20/1177

The Tempe Municipal Building is an inverted pyramid-shaped building which serves as the city hall of Tempe, Arizona. It was designed by architects Rolf Osland, Michael Goodwin and Kemper Goodwin, and built during 1969–1971.

== Design and construction ==
The first design Michael Goodwin proposed was a large concrete building, similar to Boston City Hall. The city council rejected his design. The next was a structure that terraced down the slope of Tempe Butte. The council also rejected this design. Goodwin then came up with the idea of an inverted pyramid while in the shower. He saw how light shined across the shower door at 45-degree angles, what followed was a conversation with Rolf Osland who drafted the formal design. In 1966 the Goodwin firm drew up the plans for the new municipal building. The building's inverted pyramidal shape helps in keeping the building cool in summer and warm in winter. The ground floor comprises only 2,025 square feet (188.1 m^{2}) of reception space, while the second floor is 5,625 square feet (522.6 m^{2}) and the third floor 10,000 square feet (930 m^{2}). The council chambers are in a semi-buried basement level. The building is flanked by free-standing fire stair towers. Ground was broken in 1969. The contractor selected was M. M. Sundt Construction Company of Phoenix. The building was completed in 1971 and inaugurated on October 2 of that year.

== Renovations ==
In July 2019 the first phase of a decade long renovation began. The first phase includes renovation of the plaza level council chambers which haven't been updated since the late 1980s. The council chamber renovation is expected to be completed in early 2020. The second phase is a renovation to the west garden level. The other phases include renovations to the interior of the building and new heating and air conditioning equipment. The four phase renovation is expected to be completed by the end of the 2020s.

== Gallery ==
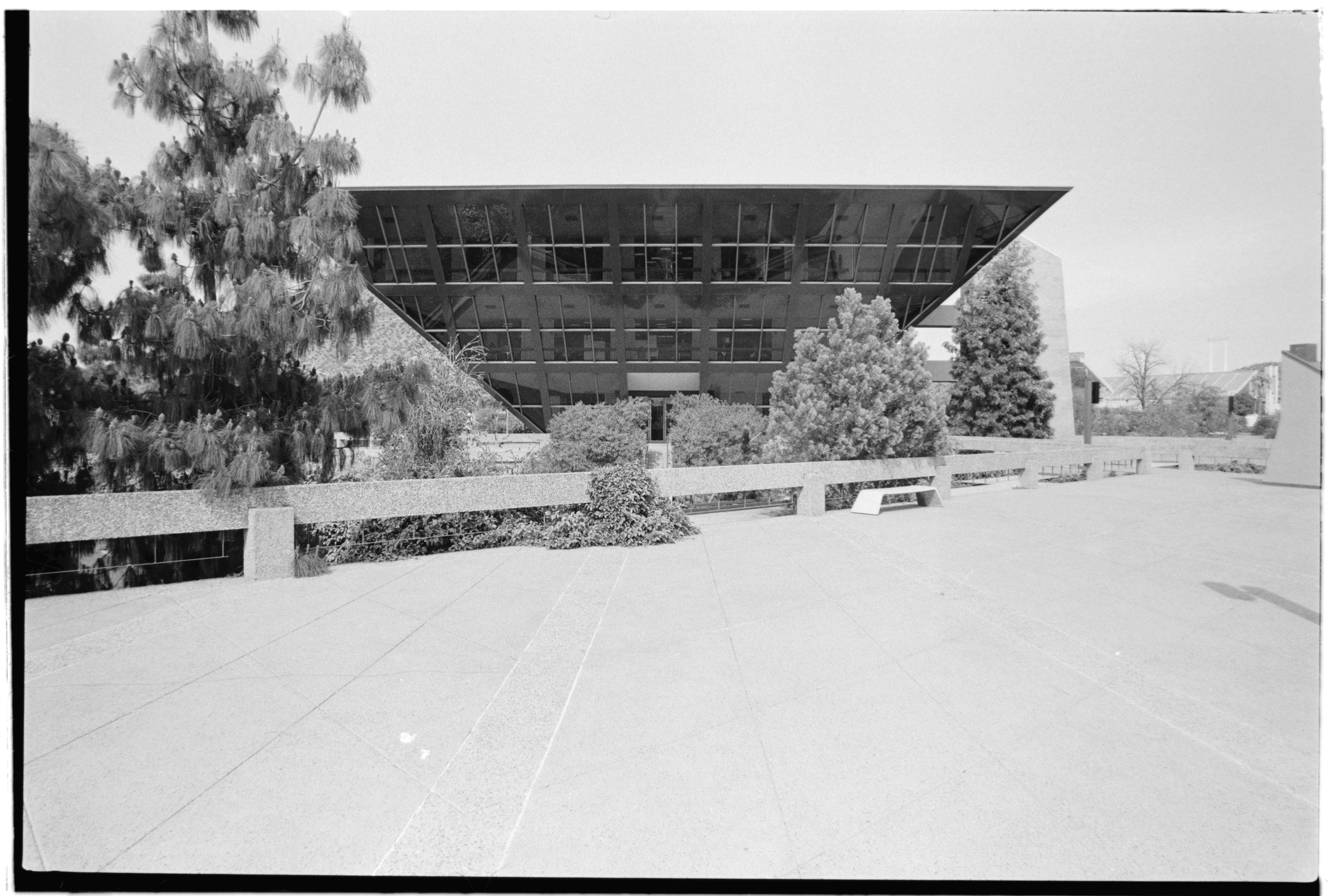
Lobby level, looking east

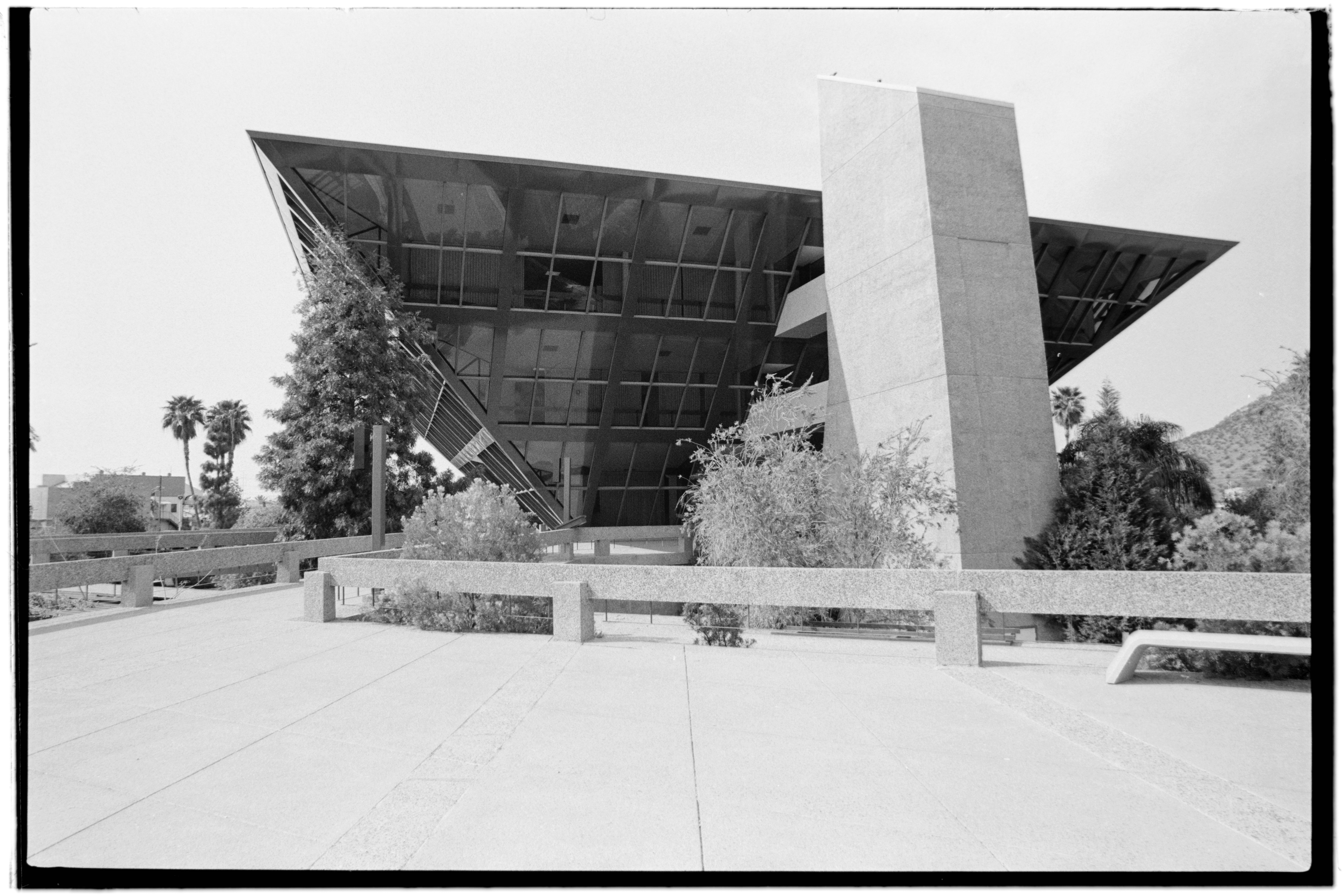
Lobby level, looking northeast

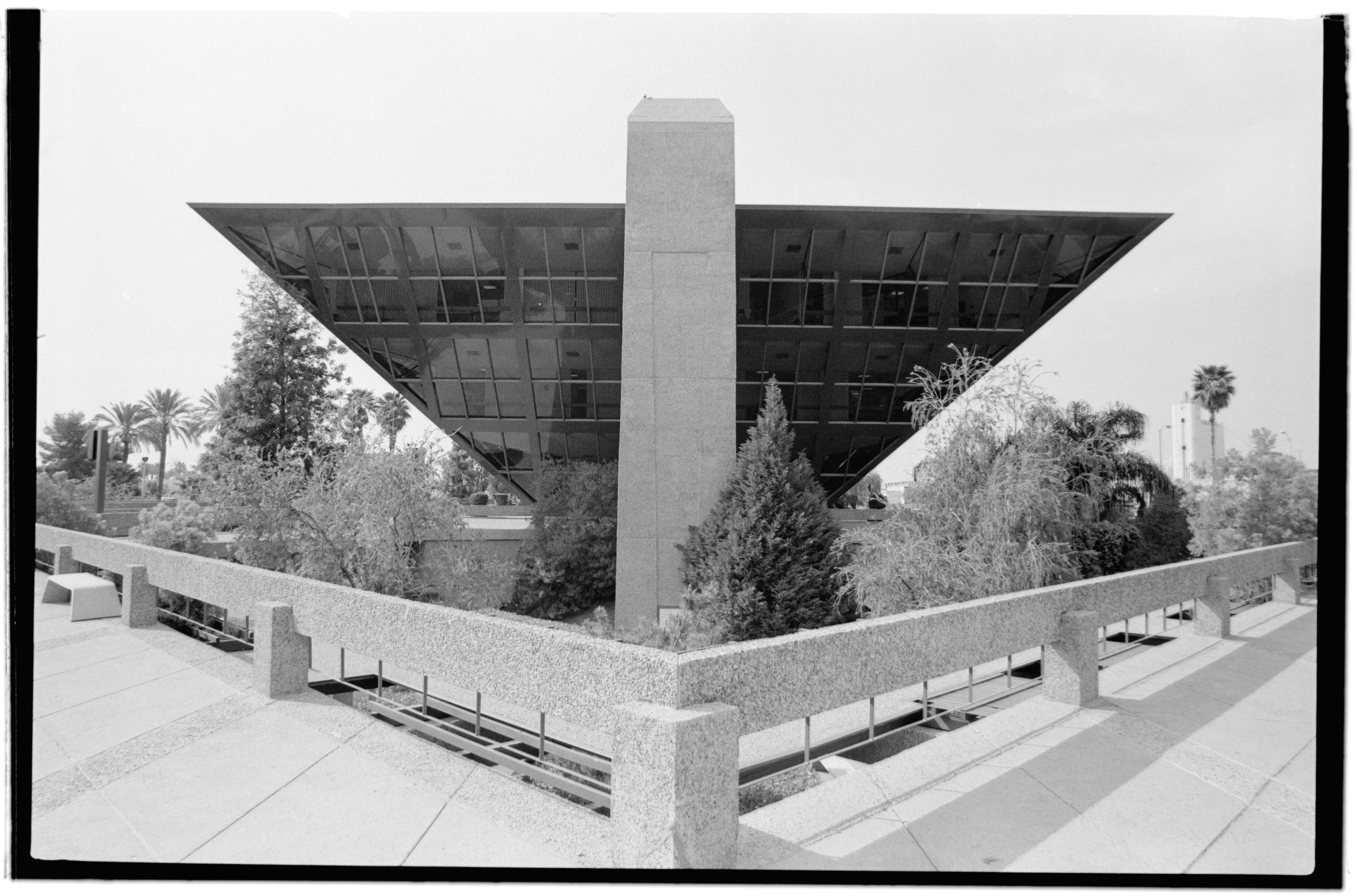
Lobby level, looking northwest

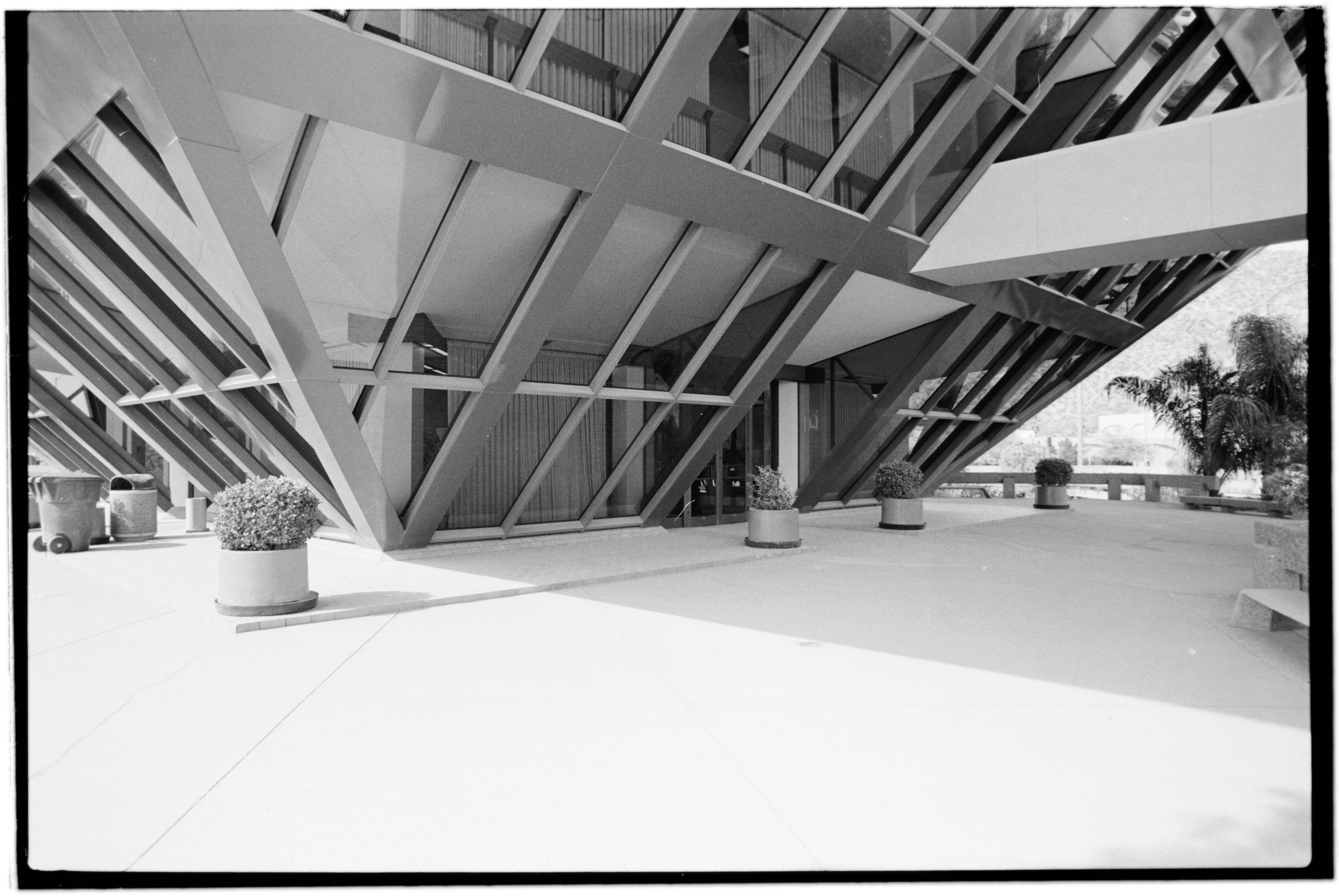
Plaza level entrance

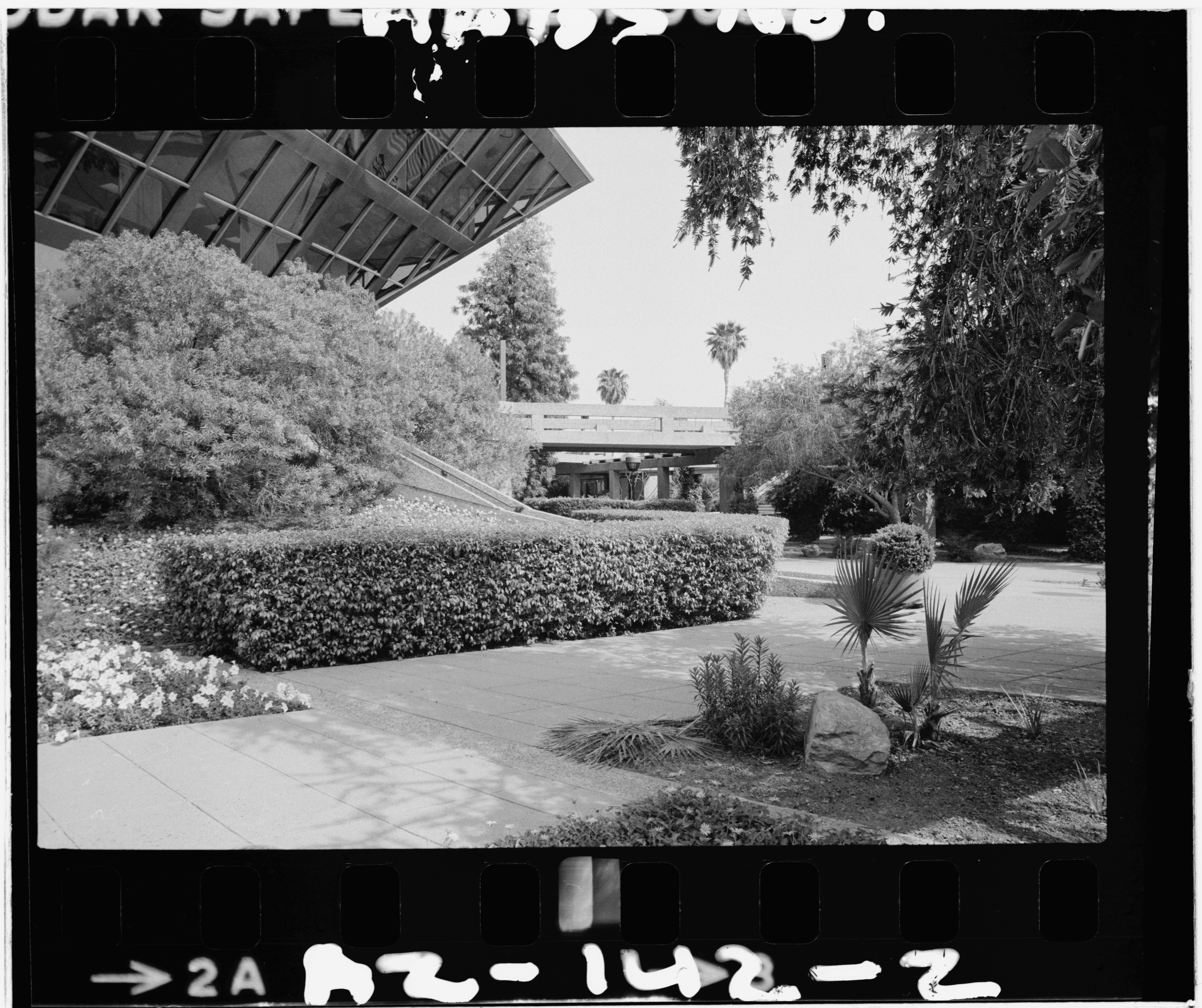
Plaza level gardens

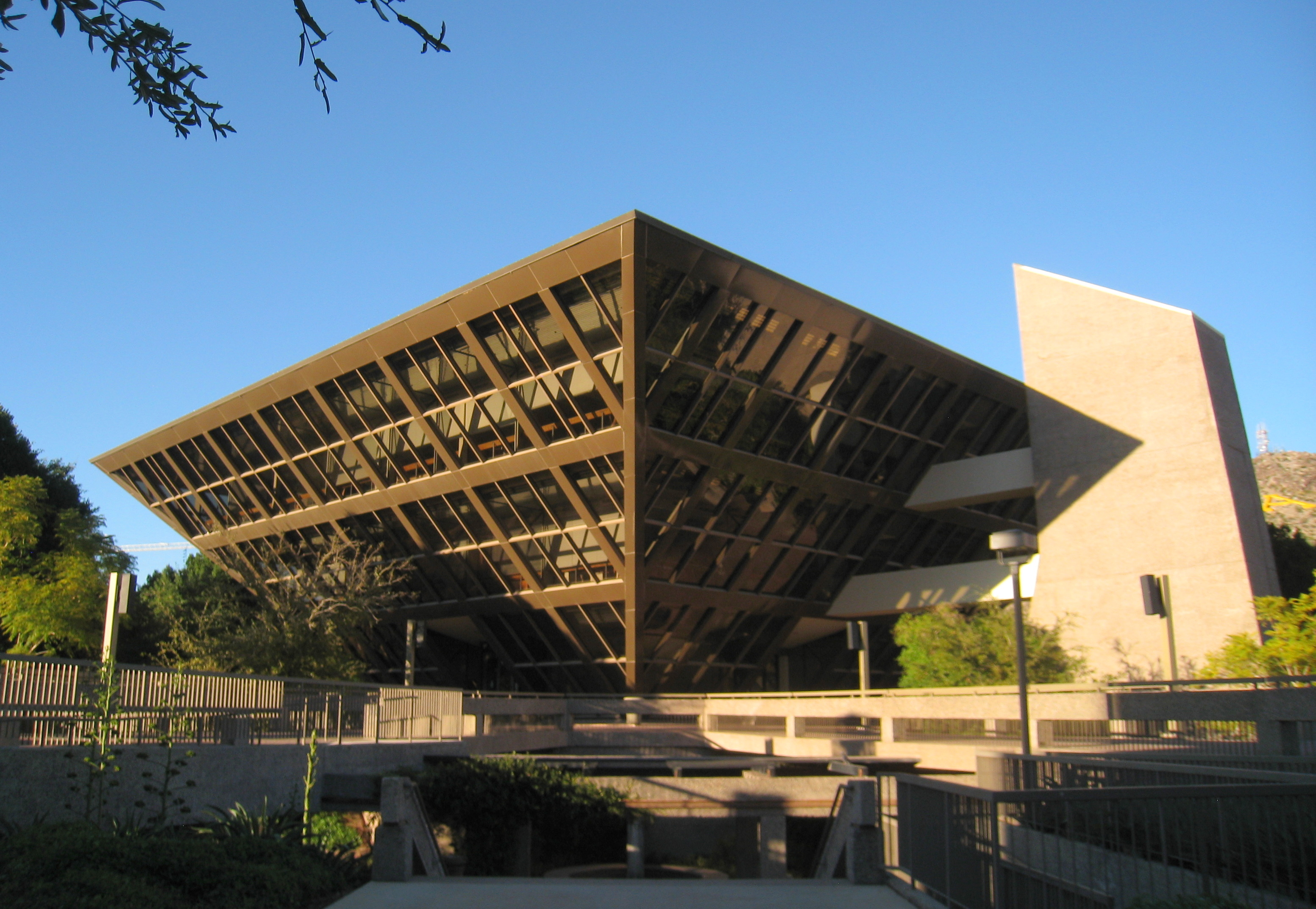
View of the entire complex

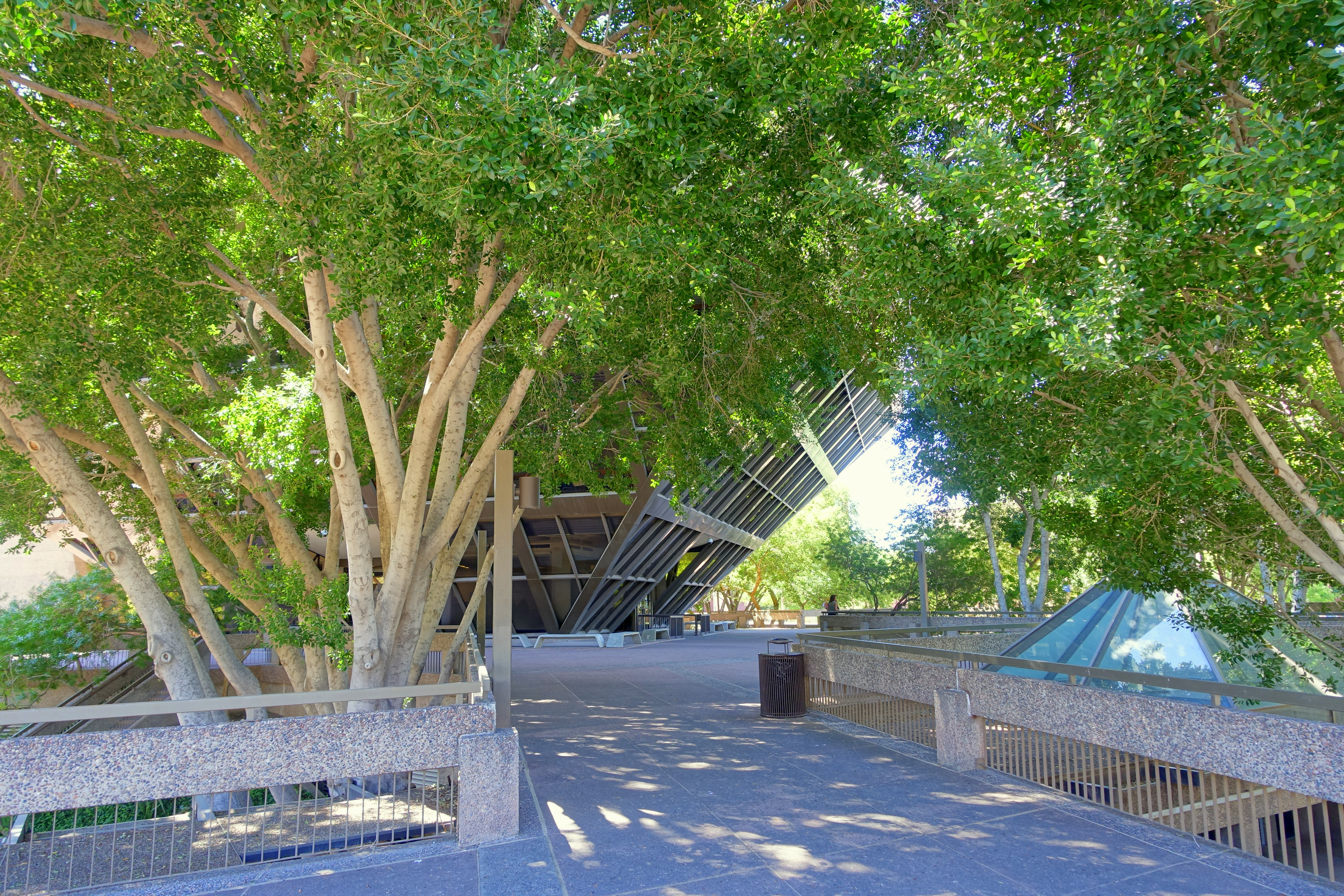
Lobby level with mature trees

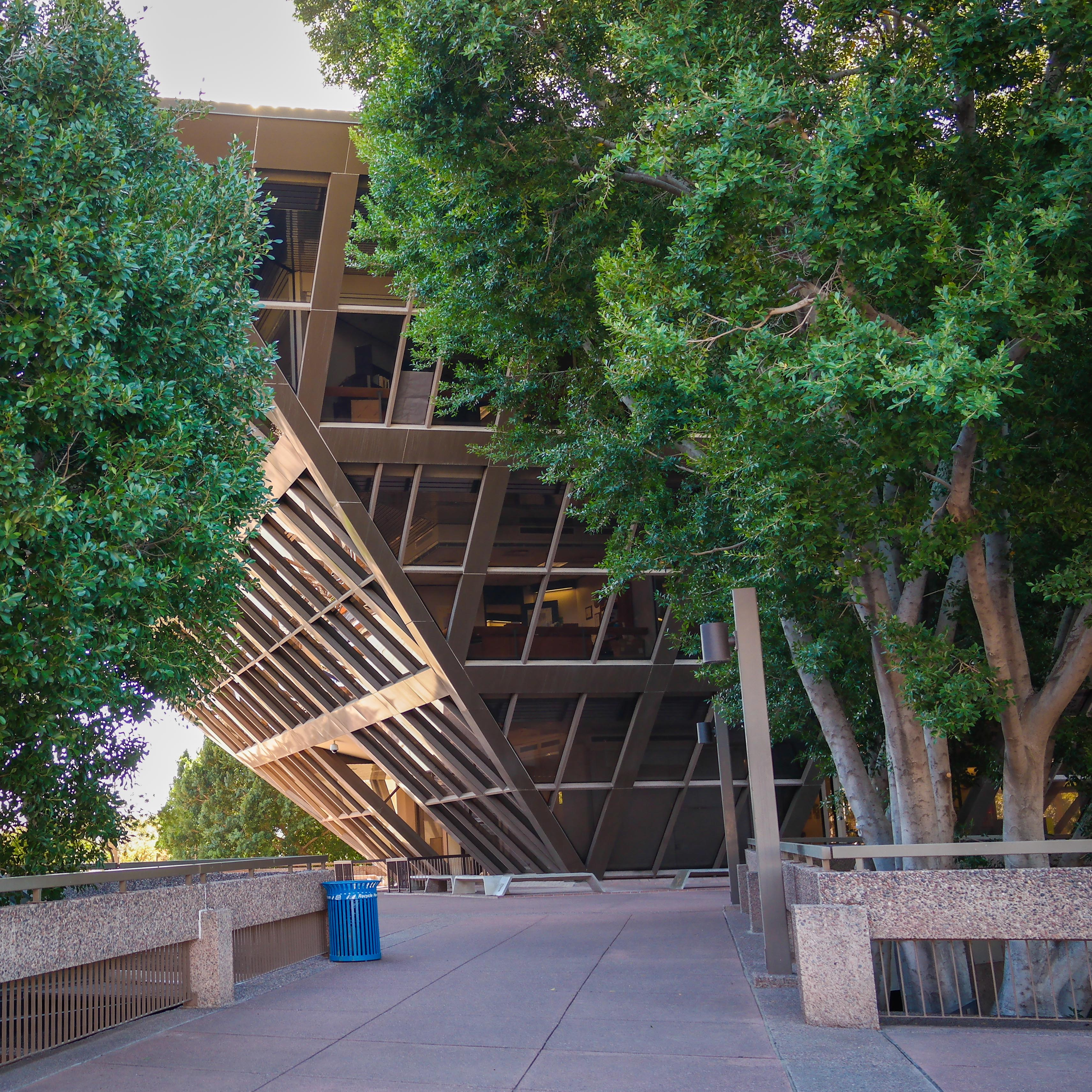
View of the building from behind mature trees

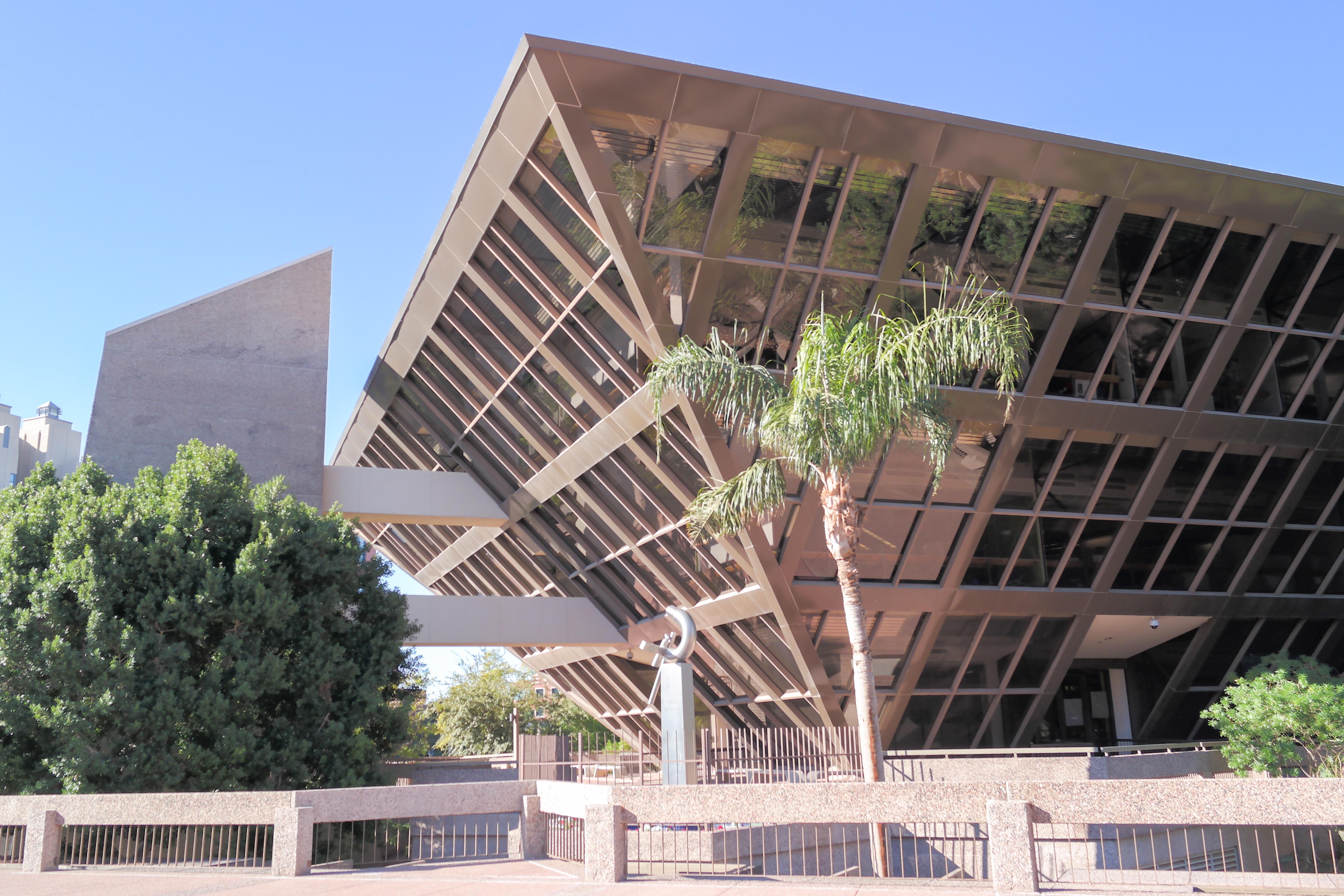
View from lobby level with ramps connecting the building to the fire stair tower.

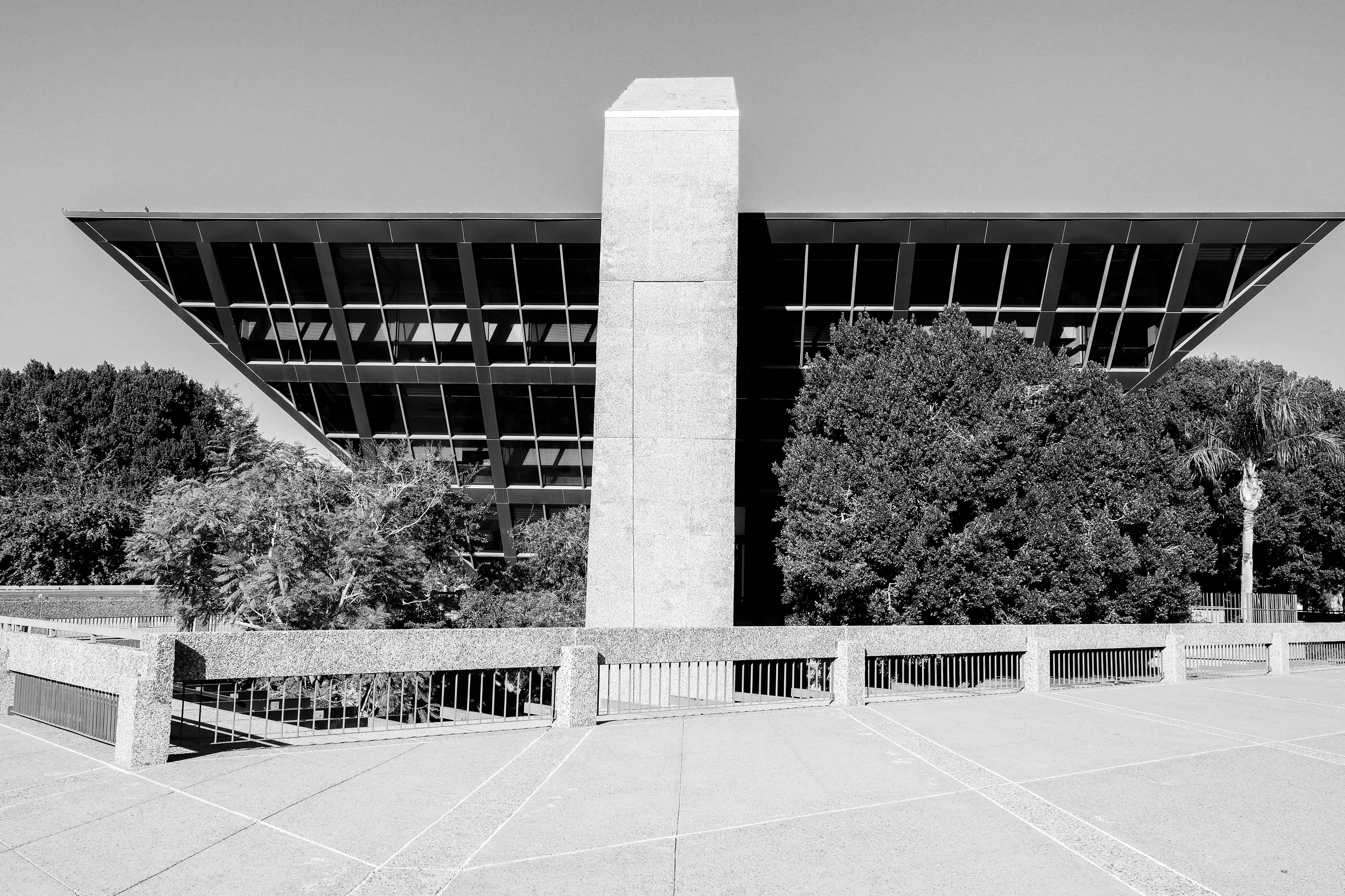
Fire stair tower at center

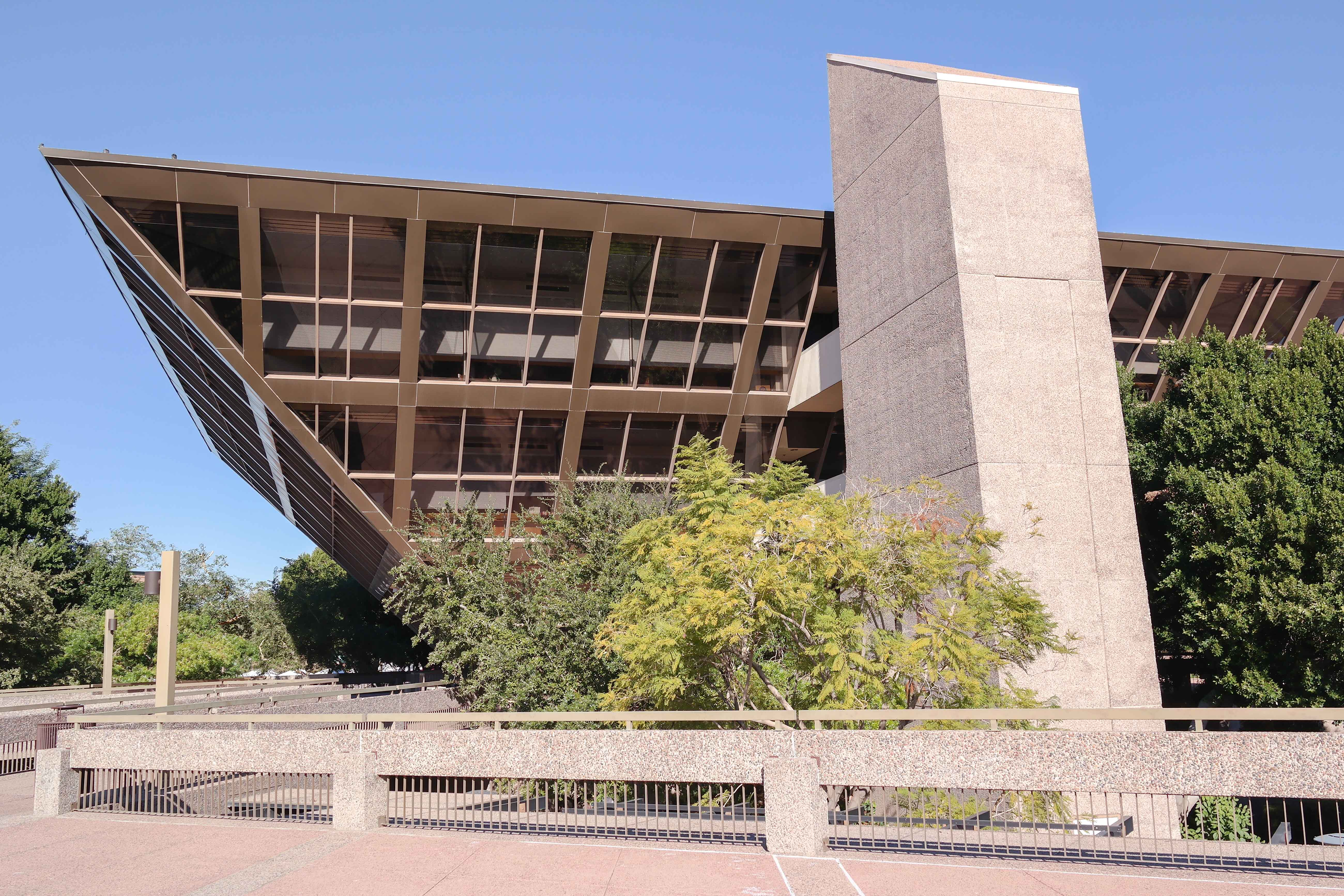
View from lobby level with fire stair tower at right

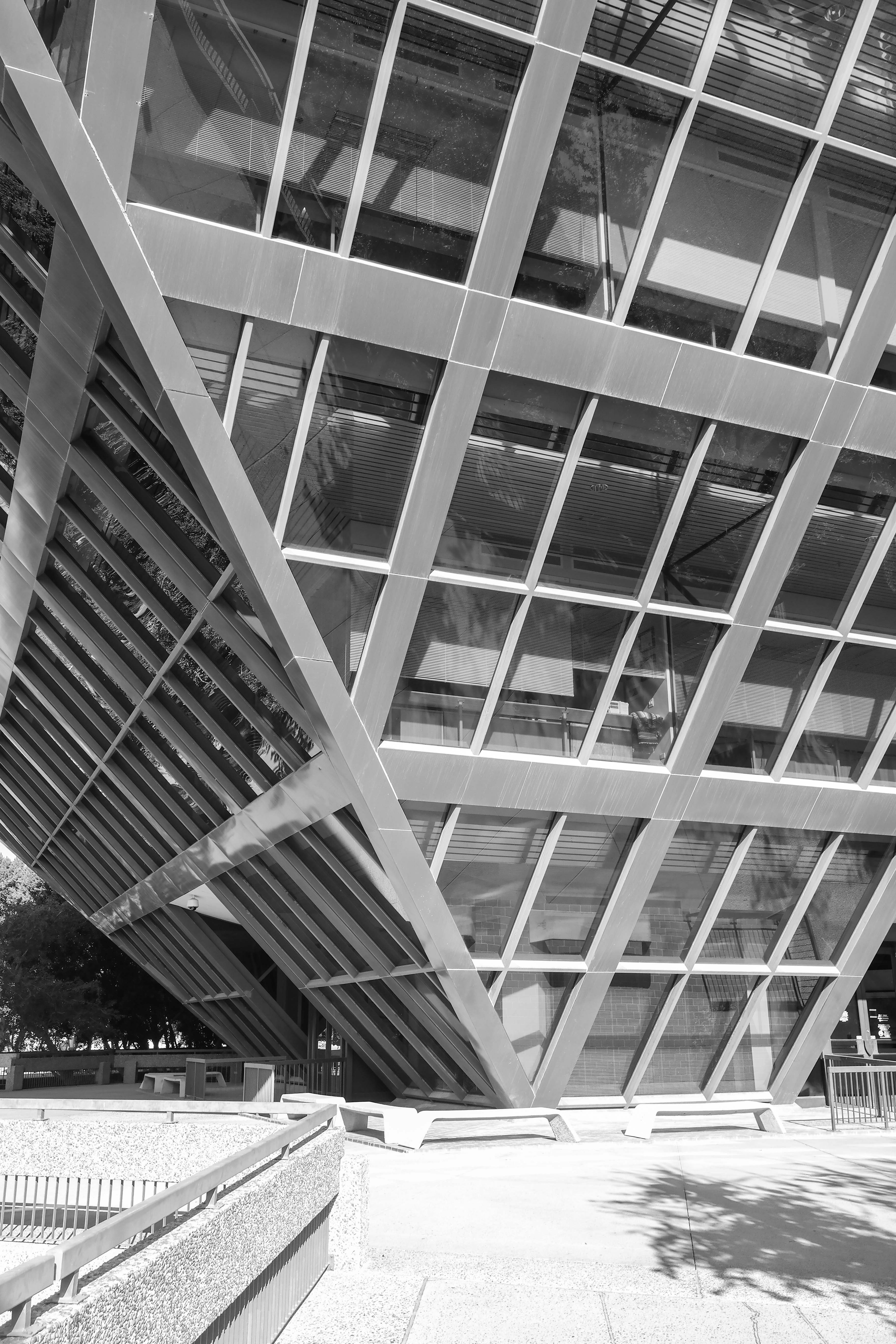
Close up view of the inverted pyramid

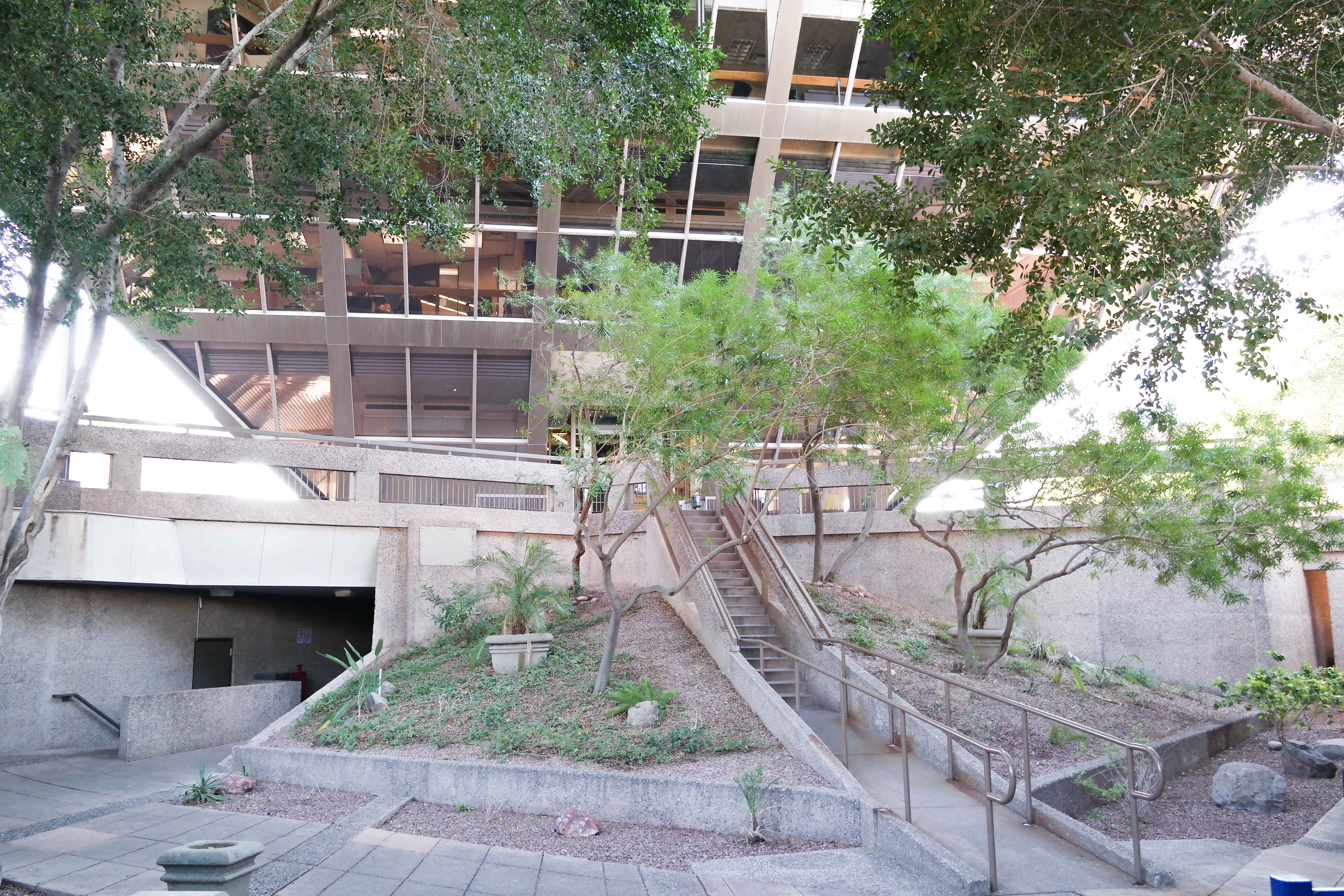
Plaza level gardens and access stairs

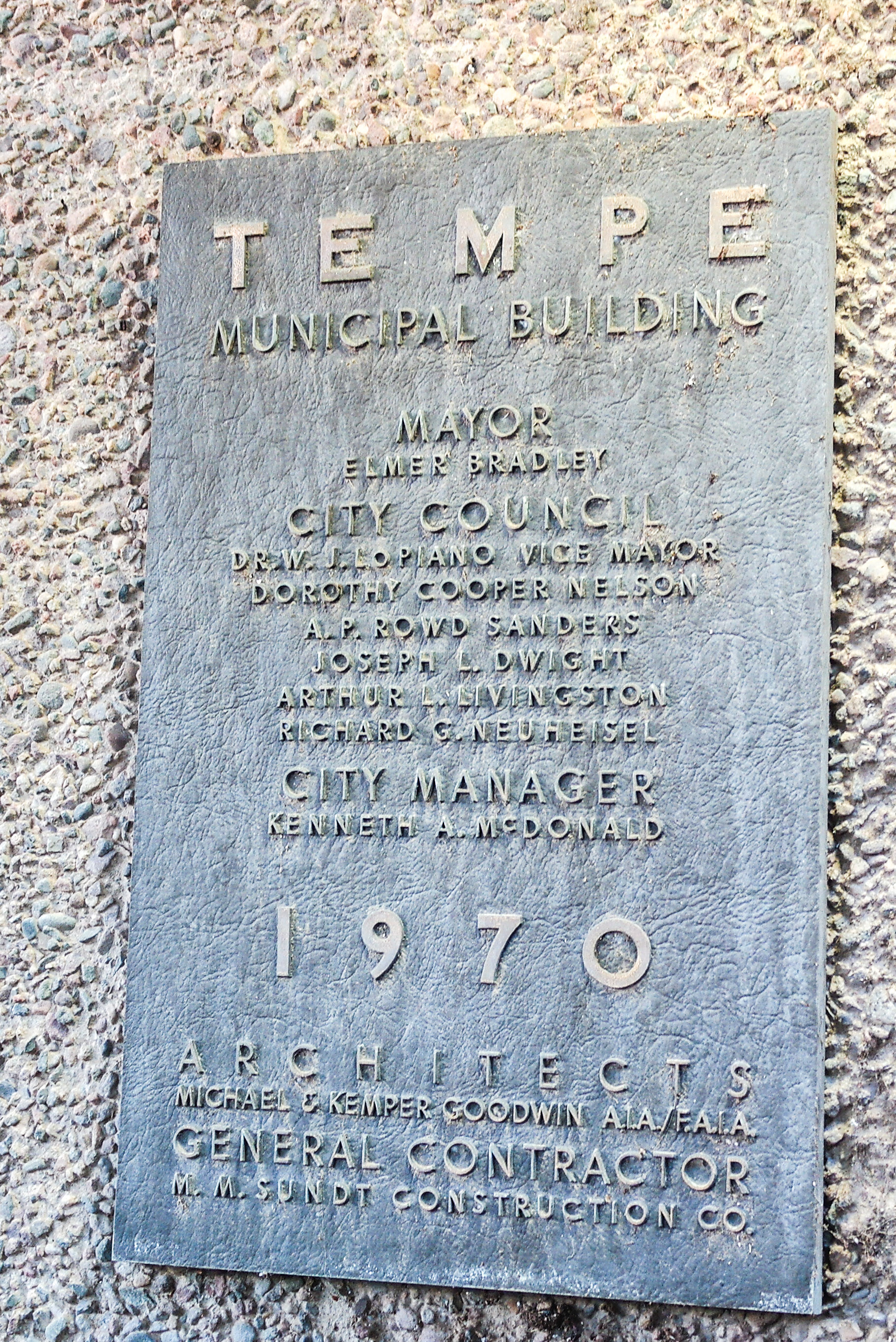
Building plaque

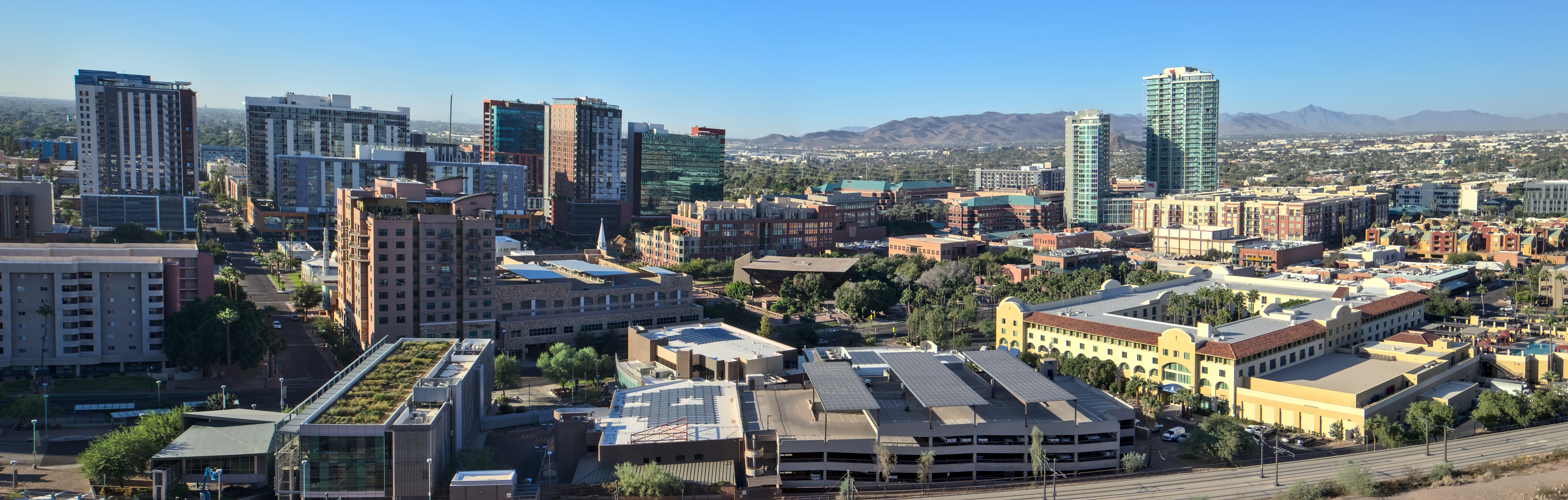
Location of Tempe Municipal Building (center) within downtown Tempe

== See also ==
- Buildings and structures in Tempe, Arizona
- Modernist architecture in Arizona
