= Mike Pollak =

American football player (born 1985)

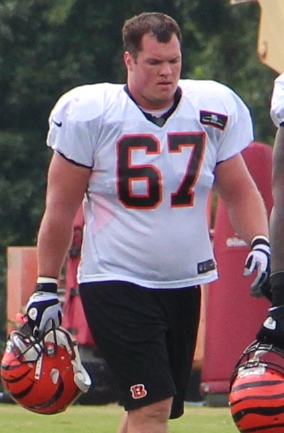
- Pollak with the Cincinnati Bengals in 2013

No. 78, 74, 67
- Position: Guard

Personal information
- Born: February 16, 1985 (age 41); Scottsdale, Arizona, U.S.
- Listed height: 6 ft 3 in (1.91 m)
- Listed weight: 300 lb (136 kg)

Career information
- High school: Corona del Sol (Tempe, Arizona)
- College: Arizona State
- NFL draft: 2008: 2nd round, 59th overall pick

Career history
- Indianapolis Colts (2008–2011); Carolina Panthers (2012); Cincinnati Bengals (2013–2014)

Awards and highlights
- PFWA All-Rookie Team (2008); First-team All-Pac-10 (2007); Second-team All-Pac-10 (2006)

Career NFL statistics
- Games played: 81
- Games started: 52
- Stats at Pro Football Reference

Michael David Pollak (born February 16, 1985) is an American former professional football player who was a guard for seven seasons in the National Football League (NFL). He played college football for the Arizona State Sun Devils and was selected by the Indianapolis Colts in the second round of the 2008 NFL draft.

== Early life ==
Pollak graduated Corona del Sol High School in Tempe, Arizona, in 2003. While at Corona del Sol he played offensive guard and defensive tackle, and was regarded as a three-star recruit by Rivals.com. He received many honors including All-Region honors from Prep Star, first-team All-Arizona by The Arizona Republic and first-team All-City and All-Conference recognition as a senior. Pollak also was a star baseball pitcher receiving first-team All-Region, All-East Valley, and All-Conference.

== College career ==
Pollak attended Arizona State from 2003 to 2007. Pollak was a starter at center during his junior and senior year. In 2006, he received All-Pac-10 Conference second-team and in 2007 he received first-team All-Pac-10 Conference honors. During his senior year, he was a finalist for the Rimington Trophy, which is awarded to the nations top center. In 2007, he received the Tim Landers Iron Man Award, Cecil Bono Team Captain Award, and Pat Tillman Award, all awards given out by the Arizona State Sun Devils.

== Professional career ==
Pre-draft measurables
Height	Weight	Arm length	Hand span	40-yard dash	10-yard split	20-yard split	20-yard shuttle	Three-cone drill	Vertical jump	Broad jump	Bench press
6 ft 3 1/2 in (1.92 m)	301 lb (137 kg)	31 3/4 in (0.81 m)	9 1/4 in (0.23 m)	5.02 s	1.73 s	2.88 s	4.47 s	7.49 s	28.0 in (0.71 m)	9 ft 3 in (2.82 m)	29 reps
All values from NFL Combine/Pro Day

=== Indianapolis Colts ===
Pollak was selected by the Indianapolis Colts in the second round of the 2008 NFL draft with the 59th overall pick. The Colts moved Pollak to guard and as a rookie he started 13 of 13 games. In 2009, Pollak entered as the starter at right guard.

=== Carolina Panthers ===
Pollak signed with the Carolina Panthers on March 22, 2012.

=== Cincinnati Bengals ===
Pollak signed with the Cincinnati Bengals on April 12, 2013.

On March 7, 2014, Pollak re-signed with the Bengals on a three-year contract.

The Bengals released him on February 20, 2015.
