= Marcos de Niza High School =

Public school in Maricopa County, Arizona

Location
- 6000 S. Lakeshore Drive; Tempe, AZ 85283; 33°21′58″N 111°55′17″W

Information
- Type: Public
- Established: 1971; 55 years ago
- School district: Tempe Union High School District
- Principal: Noe Ochoa
- Staff: 77.20 (FTE)
- Grades: 9–12
- Enrollment: 1,458 (2023–2024)
- Student to teacher ratio: 18.89
- Colors: Brown and gold
- Athletics conference: AIA
- Mascot: Padre
- Rival: Corona del Sol High School
- Website: marcosdeniza.tempeunion.org

Marcos de Niza High School is a high school located in Tempe, Arizona. It was founded in 1971 and it has an enrollment of approximately 1,500 students. The school's mascot is the Padre. The school is a part of the Tempe Union High School District and mainly serves students in central Tempe, as well as the Town of Guadalupe.

== History ==
The Tempe High School District hired the local architecture office of Michael & Kemper Goodwin Ltd. to design the new school. Kemper Goodwin along with his son Michael began drawing up plans for the campus in 1969. The school opened in 1971. Additions were made to the campus in 1974.

== Athletics ==
State championships

- 1980, 1986, 1989, 1990 – Girls' Basketball State Champions
- 1990, 1991, 1992 – Boys' Soccer State Championships
- 1990, 1991 – Girls' Archery State Champions
- 1993 – Girls' Volleyball State Champions
- 1997, 2002, 2003, 2004 – Wrestling State Champions
- 1998 – Spirit Line State Champions
- 2002 – Boys' Basketball State Champions
- 2007 – Boys' Baseball State Champions
- 2008 – Girls' Golf 5A-II State Champions

Runner-up

- 1981, 1988, 1991, 1992 – Girls' Basketball State Runner-up
- 1992, 2003 – Softball State Runner-up
- 1994 – Girls' Volleyball State Runner-up
- 1996 – Wrestling State Runner-up
- 1997, 2008 – Boys' Volleyball State Runner-up
- 1998 – Baseball State Runner-up
- 1999, 2008 – Spirit Line State Runner-up
- 2007 – Girls' Golf 5A-II State Runner-up (Team/Individual)
- 2008 – Boys' Basketball 5A-II State Runner-up
- 2009, 2015 – Football 5A-II State Runners-up

== Notable alumni ==
- Marcus Brunson, sprinter
- Joy Burke, professional basketball player
- Caleb Clifton, drummer for American metalcore band Eyes Set To Kill
- Preston Dennard, NFL wide receiver for the Los Angeles Rams, Buffalo Bills and Green Bay Packers
- Sam Dorman, three-time state diving champion, representing the U.S. in synchronized diving in the 2016 Summer Olympics
- Sanjiv Sam Gambhir, physician, scientist
- N'Keal Harry, NFL wide receiver, for the New England Patriot's (attended, but did not graduate)
- Adam Johnson, Pulitzer Prize winner, professor at Stanford
- John C. Kilkenny, producer and Executive VP, 20th Century Fox Studios
- Danny Martinez, wrestler; professional MMA formerly with the UFC
- Carla Morrison, indie-pop guitarist
- Byron Murphy, NFL cornerback, Minnesota Vikings (attended, but did not graduate)
- Mary Louise Parker, actress
- Derek Price, NFL tight end for the Detroit Lions (NFL)
- Douglas Razzano, figure skater
- Frankie Saenz, professional Mixed Martial Arts fighter (UFC)
- Columbus (Keith) Short, actor and choreographer (attended, but did not graduate)
- Greg Vanney, soccer player
- Kevin Warren, NFL executive
- Norifumi Yamamoto, wrestler; professional mixed martial artist
