= Tempe Elementary School District =

School district in Arizona, United States

Tempe Elementary School District #3

Location
- 3205 S Rural Rd; Tempe, Arizona 85282

District information
- Type: Public
- Motto: “Inspire Excellence... Every child, Every adult, Every day”
- Established: 1874
- Superintendent: Dr. James Driscoll

Students and staff
- Students: 11,733 (2015)

Other information
- Website: www.tempeschools.org

The Tempe Elementary School District is a school district in Tempe, Arizona.

The Tempe Elementary School District is located in the heart of the “Valley of the Sun”. It encompasses an area of approximately 36 square miles (93 km^{2}) including not only Tempe but also parts of Phoenix and the Town of Guadalupe. Arizona State University, the fifth largest campus in the nation (with more than 50,000 students) is within the district's boundaries providing professional and educational opportunities.

The 21 schools in the Tempe Elementary School District consist of 14 elementary schools grades kindergarten through five, a developmental special education school, an Intervention Learning Program middle school, four middle schools grades six through eight, a k-8 school, and a K-8 traditional school.

== Governing Board Members ==
The Tempe Elementary School District has five members, each serving four year terms.

- Charlotte Winsor, President (Term ends Dec. 31, 2026)
- Allison Ewers, Vice President (Term ends Dec. 31, 2028)
- Jim Lemmon, Member (Term ends Dec. 31, 2028)
- Eric Miller, Member (Term ends Dec. 31, 2026)
- Ray Thiry, Member (Term ends Dec. 31, 2028)

== Native American absenteeism ==
In 2007, it launched a program to reduce absenteeism among its 1,200 Native American students. A district supervision commented that some Native American parents had negative perceptions of schools. The program includes liaisons with parents and help with resources ranging from alarm clocks to transportation.

== School Name Changes ==
In 2021, staffers from the Arizona Historical Society and Tempe History Museum found that several Tempe parks and streets had been named after local Ku Klux Klan members from the 1920s, including three TESD schools. Following several public meetings, the District decided to change the names of the affected schools.

In 2022, the three schools had their names changed. Hudson Elementary became Joseph Spracale Elementary, Gililland Middle School became Geneva Epps Mosley Middle School, and Laird School became Cecil Shamley School. All three schools were named after former Tempe educators.

== Preschools ==
- Getz School

== Elementary schools ==
- Aguilar Elementary School
- Arredondo Elementary School
- Broadmor Elementary School
- Carminati Elementary School
- Curry Elementary School
- Frank Elementary School
- Fuller Elementary School
- Holdeman Elementary School
- Joseph Spracale Elementary School
- Nevitt Elementary School
- Rover Elementary School
- Scales Technology Academy
- Thew Elementary School
- Wood Elementary School

== Middle schools ==
- Connolly Middle School
- Geneva Epps Mosley Middle School
- Fees College Preparatory Middle School
- Tempe Academy of International Studies - McKemy Campus

== K-8 schools ==
- Ward Traditional Academy
- Cecil Shamley School

== See also ==
- Tempe Union High School District
- Kyrene School District
