= Tempe High School (Arizona) =

Public high school in the United States

Location
- 1730 S. Mill Avenue; Tempe, AZ 85281
- 33°24′30″N 111°56′28″W

Information
- Type: Public
- Established: 1908 (current site 1953)
- School district: Tempe Union High School District
- Principal: Adam Johnson
- Staff: 81.15 (FTE)
- Grades: 9–12
- Enrollment: 1,621 (2019–20)
- Student to teacher ratio: 19.98
- Color
- Athletics conference: AIA 4A Skyline
- Team name: Buffaloes
- Website: http://www.tempeunion.org/tempehigh

Tempe High School is a public high school located in Tempe, Arizona, approximately one mile south of Arizona State University.

== History ==
The original Tempe Union High School building

Tempe Union High School was established by a vote of the people of Tempe in 1908. It was required, as the Normal School in Tempe (now ASU) no longer would enroll students with 8th-grade diplomas. Classes were held in rented space in downtown Tempe for the 1908–09 school year, as the school's permanent location was built. The first building opened in the fall of 1909 on the southeast corner of Mill and University (today the Tempe Towne Center, the town's first strip mall).

Kemper Goodwin, a prominent local architect, would go on to graduate from Tempe High in the mid-1920s, then design its current campus in the 1950s. Games were played at Goodwin Stadium, the home of the ASU Sun Devils until 1957, and in the 1920s, the two teams played against each other on numerous occasions. It was not until 1969 that Tempe High's campus hosted football games.

In 1953, the current Tempe High School opened with the administration and library buildings; three classroom units; and the cafeteria. (These are now buildings B through F). The new campus was designed by Goodwin and built by The William Peper Construction Co. The gymnasium and auditorium remained at the former site for two more years until both burned down in 1955, both to clear the land for construction of Tempe Towne Center and to provide practice for the fire department. The "modular site" was fleshed out by the end of the 1960s.

=== Explosion of enrollment ===
Tempe expanded tremendously during the 1950s and 1960s. It grew so overcrowded at Tempe High School that double sessions were featured during the fall of 1964. The evening sessions were titled McClintock High School (they eventually moved to their own campus in January 1965).

Both Tempe and McClintock would share a defining rivalry in Tempe sports. Their football and basketball games, due to heightened interest, often wound up on ASU's campus and fields.

=== Today ===
Tempe High's enrollment generally ranges between 1,300 and 1,400 students. As of the 2017–2018 school year they have over 1,800 students enrolled. THS offers a wide variety of curriculum, including an honors Curriculum, the International Baccalaureate program, and H.O.P.E. which allows students to explore and train for medical professions by partnership with Tempe St. Luke's Hospital.

== Centennial ==
During the 2007–08 school year, Tempe High celebrated its 100th anniversary, beginning with a Centennial Homecoming Celebration. To celebrate this momentous occasion, a Centennial Committee was formed under the wing of the Tempe High Buffalo Foundation. The Buffalo Foundation is the prime alumni organization for Tempe High School. This organization helps preserve the proud traditions and history of Tempe High and serves as an alumni resource for reunions and fundraising events.

Centennial events included: Athletic Hall of Fame dinner, Homecoming parade down Mill Avenue, Back to the Future celebration, and the Embassy Suites Blue and White Bash.

== Athletics ==
The Buffaloes have won three state championship titles since Tempe varsity football began in 1924. The first came in 1956 when Tempe High went undefeated with a 10–0 record under coach John Zucco. Between 1954 and 1957, Coach Zucco led the Buffaloes to a 32-6-1 record that included an 18-game winning streak. The Buffaloes' second championship came in 1989 when they shared the 4A title with Agua Fria. In the final playoff game in Sun Devil Stadium, which was attended by more than 11,000 fans, the Buffaloes and the Owls fought to a 10–10 draw. The tie game capped a 13-1-1 season under second-year coach Jim Murphy. The Buffaloes last state championship came with a win at the 4A state championship in 1996, beating Glendale Ironwood 20–17 in an overtime thriller. The Buffaloes won by a touchdown pass from Todd Mortensen to Justin Taplin. This victory capped a perfect 14–0 season, led by Tim McBurney.

In 1989 one of the greatest football games was played between the two schools, more than 10,000 fans were in attendance to watch Tempe High defeat McClintock 25–24. Both teams went on to claim state championships that year.

== Notable alumni ==
- Darnell Autry - former NFL football player
- Ira A. Fulton - Arizona land developer & philanthropist
- Harry Mitchell - former Tempe Mayor, former Arizona Democratic Party Congressman
- Fred Mortensen - former NFL football player
- Gregg Turkington - actor and comedian
- Rebecca MacKinnon - author, researcher, former CNN journalist, Internet freedom advocate, and co-founder of the citizen media network Global Voices Online.
- Isela Blanc - Member of the Arizona House of Representatives from the 26th district.
- Jim Warne (American football) – former NFL football player
