= Derek Price (American football) =

American football player (born 1972)

No. 82
- Position: Tight end

Personal information
- Born: August 12, 1972 (age 54); Tempe, Arizona, U.S.
- Listed height: 6 ft 3 in (1.91 m)
- Listed weight: 240 lb (109 kg)

Career information
- High school: Marcos de Niza (Tempe)
- College: Iowa
- NFL draft: 1996: undrafted

Career history
- Detroit Lions (1996)
- Stats at Pro Football Reference

Derek Christopher Price (born August 12, 1972) is an American former professional football player who was a tight end for the Detroit Lions of the National Football League (NFL). He played college football for the Iowa Hawkeyes.

He is the CEO of Desert Hope Treatment Center, an American Addiction Centers rehab facility in Las Vegas, Nevada.
