= Kyrene School District =

School district in Maricopa County, Arizona

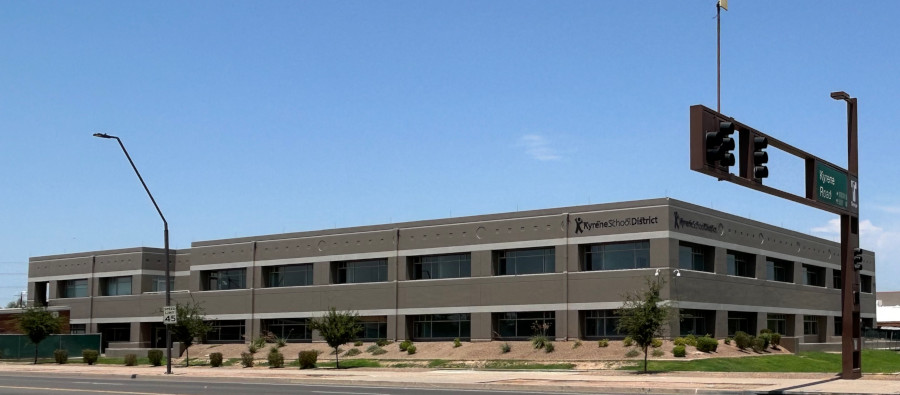
- Kyrene School District administration building

Location
- 8700 S. Kyrene Road, Tempe AZ 85284

District information
- Type: Public
- Established: 1888
- Superintendent: Laura Toenjes
- NCES District ID: 0404230

Students and staff
- Students: approx. 12,000

Other information
- Website: http://www.kyrene.org

Kyrene School District is a K-8 school district that serves parts of Tempe, Chandler, Guadalupe, and Ahwatukee, Phoenix, Arizona as well as portions of the Gila River Indian Community within Maricopa County. Kyrene School District operates a total of 22 schools, consisting of fifteen elementary schools, six middle schools and one K-8 school. The District Office Administration Building of the Kyrene School District (known as the Ben Furlong Education Center) is located at 8700 S Kyrene Rd, Tempe, Arizona 85284.

== History ==
In 1888, the Kyrene School District was founded at the request of nine families who wanted a school district for 17 children. The original boundary area was far smaller than currently; though the north boundary is unchanged, the Kyrene district confirmed its east boundary at Price Road and has since extended west from its 56th Street/Priest Drive boundary and south from Pecos Road to include much of the Gila River Indian Community. The district built a small school that was destroyed in a windstorm; until 1920, the Kyrene School site was at McClintock and Warner roads, two miles due east of the Furlong Center (a 1990 build).

Many teachers who received their educational certificates from Arizona State University, originally called Tempe Normal School, taught in one of the two-schoolroom buildings. Mr. Earl D. Willams graduated from Arizona State University and began teaching Industrial Art at the Kyrene Junior High K-8 on Warner and Kyrene Rd. Mr. Williams built the first Industrial Art Shop-Class, the Library and the Administration Building. He also built a replica of the original school house for the Kyrene Bicentennial Parade. Mr. Earl Williams taught Industrial Art for thirty years at Kyrene.

Kyrene approached the early 1970s with 600 students in the entire district, mostly Hispanic students from a small area named "Sende Vista", just south of Guadalupe, an area of South Phoenix called "Highland Terrace", and the Hightown neighborhood of Chandler. Five buses transported the districts to school.

Resources in the '70s were concentrated on building classroom space for the district that would grow fourfold by 1980. C.I. Waggoner elementary was expanded, and the District completed Lomas and Norte elementary schools. (C.I. Waggoner Elementary School, est. 1969, is the oldest operating school facility in the district.)

The 1980s brought another wave of new schools, built in mostly the same designs. Nine elementary and middle schools were built in the 1980s, and thirteen more followed by the late 1990s, bringing the District to a total of 25 schools.

In August 2020, amidst the COVID-19 pandemic, the district launched its 26th school (Kyrene's first completely on-line school) known as the Kyrene Digital Academy. The Kyrene Digital Academy was a K-8 school serving students from all over Arizona (not just within the Kyrene boundaries). Instruction was delivered one hundred percent online using live certified teachers.

== Governance and Administration ==
=== Governing Board ===
The Kyrene School District is governed by a five-member board. As of July 2026, the members are:

- President, Triné Nelson, term expires December 2026
- Vice President , Amy Satre, term expires December 2028
- Member, Bunny (Ruth) Davis, term expires December 2028
- Member, Cedric Collins, term expires December 2028
- Member, Kevin Walsh, term expires December 2026

=== Administration ===
- Superintendent - Laura Toenjes

== School Closures ==
On December 16, 2025, the Kyrene School District Governing Board voted unanimously 5 to 0 to close six schools in a phased consolidation plan. The decision was driven by long-term financial pressure resulting from declining enrollment, which had dropped from a historical peak of approximately 20,000 students to about 12,000

=== Financial Justification and Cost Savings ===
The district stated that the school closures were necessary for "right-sizing" the district to ensure fiscal stability, avoid significant position cuts, and preserve high-quality programs for all students. The closures were framed as a necessity to cope with limited state funding, with the district having already reduced expenditures by $24 million over the preceding decade due to the continuous decline in enrollment. This restructuring effort coincided with the successful renewal of the Maintenance & Operations (M&O) Override on the November 2025 ballot, which provides approximately $14.6 million in additional annual operating funds to support teacher salaries, smaller class sizes, and student services.

=== Closure Timeline ===
The six schools are scheduled to close over two consecutive school years.

Closures in the school year of 2026-2027:

- Kyrene de la Colina
- Kyrene de la Estrella
- Kyrene de las Manitas

Closures in the school year of 2027-2028:

- Kyrene Traditional Academy
- Kyrene Akimel A-al Middle School
- Kyrene del Pueblo Middle School

=== Alternative Proposals Considered ===
The final six-school plan was a compromise among several options considered by the Governing Board and the Long-Range Planning Committee. Initial proposals recommended closing or repurposing up to nine schools, later revised to eight schools, before the board requested two alternative options in December that involved fewer closures. The vote approved the six-school plan, which was one of the alternative proposals considered, in an effort to balance fiscal needs with community impact.

=== Background and Public Reaction ===
There are a number of factors driving the committee to recommend school closures including reduced enrollment caused by declining birth rates, rising real estate cost of living within district boundaries, and school choice (private schools, charters, microschools, online or home schooling). Other factors include reduced budgetary spending at the Arizona state and federal Department of Education levels.

The proposed school closure plan has been controversial, and large numbers of parents, students, and staff have argued for their schools to remain open. Additionally, other school districts in the state of Arizona have recently experienced similar issues including: Gilbert Public Schools, Scottsdale Unified School District, Roosevelt Elementary School District, Phoenix Elementary School District, Cave Creek Unified School District, Isaac Elementary School District

== Middle schools ==
Middle schools in Kyrene School District
Information	Akimel A-al (Note: The name is Tohono O'odham for "children of the river")	Altadeña	Aprende	Centennial	Kyrene MS	Pueblo
Location	Ahwatukee	Ahwatukee	Chandler	Ahwatukee	Tempe	Chandler
Opened	1992	1995	1994	1988	1985	1986
Closed	2027 (scheduled)					2027 (scheduled)
Colors	Turquoise/Black	Maroon/Blue	Gold/Black	Red/Black	Green/Black	Maroon/Gray
Mascot	Rattlers	Panthers	Jaguars	Saber Cats	Scorpions	Bulldogs
Principal	Shalini McCarthy	Erica Modzelewski	Renee Kory	James Martin	Scott Maxwell	Ashley Schutkowski
High School Feeder (TUHSD)	Mountain Pointe, Desert Vista	Desert Vista	Corona del Sol	Mountain Pointe	Corona, Mountain Pointe, Marcos de Niza	Corona del Sol and Mountain Pointe

Centennial and Pueblo opened as junior high schools and were converted to full 6-8 middle schools in 1990. Kyrene MS opened as a junior high and was converted to a full 6-8 middle school in 1989.

== Elementary schools ==
- C. I. Waggoner Elementary School, est.1969 (Note: C.I. Waggoner, the school's namesake, was a Depression-era district superintendent)
- Kyrene del Norte Dual Language Academy, est. 1974
- Kyrene de las Lomas Elementary School, est. 1976
- Kyrene del Cielo Elementary School, est.1982
- Kyrene de los Ninos Elementary School, est. 1982
- Kyrene de la Paloma Elementary School, est. 1985
- Kyrene Traditional Academy-Sureño Campus, est. 1987
- Kyrene de los Lagos Dual Language Academy, est. 1988
- Kyrene de la Mariposa Computer Science Academy, est. 1988
- Kyrene Monte Vista Elementary School, est.1989
- Kyrene de la Sierra Elementary School, est. 1992
- Kyrene de la Esperanza Elementary School, est. 1993
- Kyrene de la Mirada Elementary School, est. 1993 (Note: The school was built in partnership with Intel Corporation, which has offices across the street, and opened for the 1993-94 school year.)
- Kyrene de las Brisas Elementary School, est.1994
- Kyrene de los Cerritos Leadership Academy, est.1994
- Kyrene del Milenio Elementary School, est. 2000

== Former schools ==
- Kyrene Digital Academy
- Kyrene de la Colina Elementary School (1987-2026)
- Kyrene de las Manitas Innovation Academy (1996-2026)
- Kyrene de la Estrella Elementary School (1999-2026)
