= Corona del Sol High School =

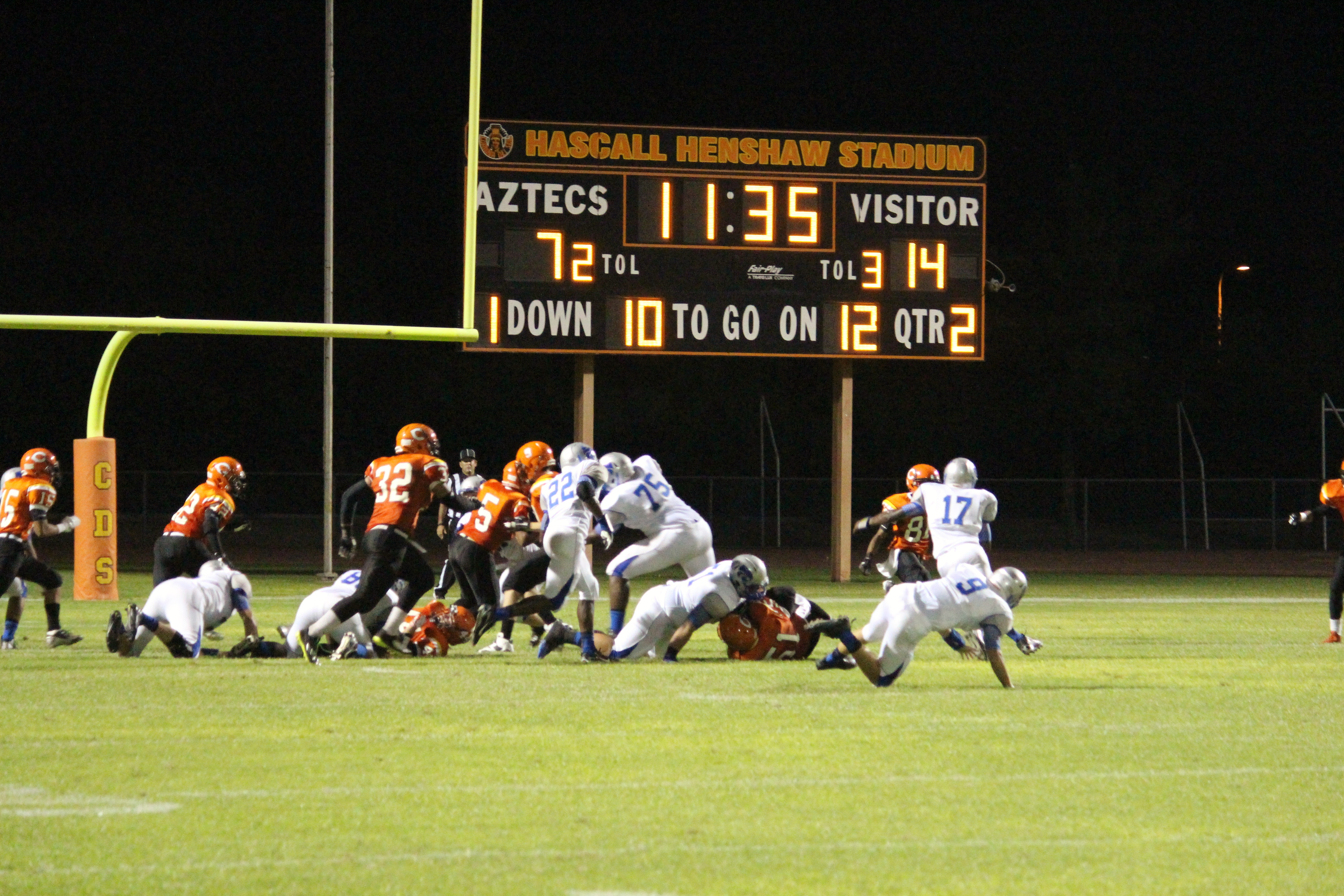
- The Aztecs compete at Hascall Henshaw Stadium, located on the school's campus.

Location
- 1001 E Knox Road; Tempe, Arizona 85284; United States; 33.326145°N 111.926769°W

Information
- Type: Public
- Established: 1977
- School district: Tempe Union High School District
- Principal: Nathan Kleve
- Staff: 121.40 (FTE)
- Grades: 9–12
- Enrollment: 2,668 (2023–2024)
- Student to teacher ratio: 21.98
- Colors: Burnt orange and yellow
- Athletics conference: AIA 6A
- Mascot: Aztecs
- Rival: Marcos de Niza High School (historical), Desert Vista High School
- Newspaper: Sunrise
- Yearbook: Sunset
- Website: Official website

Corona del Sol High School is a high school located in Tempe, Arizona, United States. It was established in 1977 and is a part of the Tempe Union High School District.

== History ==
The local architecture firm of Michael & Kemper Goodwin Ltd. was hired to design the school. The project included an early example of rooftop solar panels. The school opened in the fall of 1977, serving the then rural areas of South Tempe and West Chandler. The school expanded in 1986 and in 2001.

As of 2010, Corona del Sol is an open-enrollment school.

== Student demographics ==
During the 2018–2019 school year, Corona had an enrollment of about 2741 students. About 56% of the population are Caucasian, 24% are Hispanic, 8% are Asian, 6% are African American, 2% are Native American, and 4% are of two or more races/ethnicities.

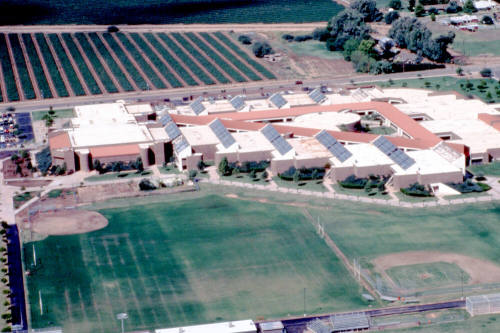
Aerial photo of Corona del Sol High School in 1977 when the surrounding area was predominantly rural.

About 65% of graduates go on to attend a four-year university or college, 23% attend a two-year community college, and 10% move on to vocational training, military service, or full-time employment.

== Athletics ==
=== Men's Basketball ===
The Corona del Sol men's basketball team has been one of the most successful basketball programs in Arizona high school history. They have been in 15 state championship games, winning 8 state championships with their most recent championship in 2015. The Aztecs have been runner-ups in 1978, 1982, 1986, 1990, 1996, 2006, and 2017. According to the AIA, the Aztecs has the second-longest winning streak in Arizona men's basketball history with 46 straight wins from 1979 to 1981. In 2022, the Arizona Republic ranked the 2014-2015 team as the greatest high school men's basketball team in Arizona history. Notable NBA players that have played at Corona includes Marvin Bagley III, Dalen Terry, and Saben Lee.

=== State championships ===
Sports	Year
Badminton	2008
Boys' Baseball	1993, 2009, 2025
Girls' Basketball	1993, 1994, 2001
Boys' Basketball	1980, 1981, 1989, 1994, 2012, 2013, 2014, 2015
Boys' Cross Country	1992, 2013
Esports	2021, 2024
Football	1980
Boys' Golf	1982
Boys' Soccer	1994, 2010
Girls' Soccer	1996, 2006, 2007
Girls' Softball	1982, 2003
Boys' Tennis	1981 (tied)
Girls' Tennis	1986 (tied)
Boys' Track and Field	1982, 2014
Boys' Volleyball	1997
Girls' Volleyball	1991, 2016, 2022
Wrestling	2009, 2010, 2017

== Notable alumni ==
- Marvin Bagley III, basketball player for the Dallas Mavericks
- Alex Barcello, basketball player for the B.C. Oostende
- Maceo Brown, plays for the United States national rugby sevens team
- Chris Cariaso, retired professional MMA fighter, formerly in the UFC
- Slade Echeverria (class of 2008), lead singer and bass guitarist of the band Anarbor
- Jesse Forbes, two-time All-State and NJCAA All-American wrestler; retired professional mixed martial artist, formerly with the UFC
- Lyndsey Fry, member of the United States women's national ice hockey team and 2014 Sochi Winter Olympics silver medalist
- Mark Goudeau, "Baseline Killer," serial killer and rapist responsible for nine murders
- Eric Halvorsen, bassist of the band A Rocket to the Moon
- Ashley Hansen, second baseman for the US national softball team
- Pat Kirch (class of 2008), drummer of the band The Maine
- Saben Lee (born 1999), basketball player for Maccabi Tel Aviv of the Israeli Basketball Premier League
- Freddy Lockhart, actor/comedian; Comedy Central Live At Gotham; star of Frank TV on TBS
- Andrew "Scooter" Molander, quarterback at Phoenix College (division II), Colorado State (division I); NFL player (Cleveland Browns, Kansas City Chiefs, NY Giants); played in Arena Football League (AFL); current football head coach for Brophy College Preparatory in Phoenix
- Avery Moss, defensive lineman for the New York Giants
- Ricky Pearsall, NFL wide receiver for the San Francisco 49ers
- Andrus Peat, offensive lineman for NFL's New Orleans Saints
- Mike Pollak, player for the Indianapolis Colts
- Brooke Schofield, podcaster and social media personality
- Dalen Terry, basketball player for the Chicago Bulls
- Cole Carlon, college baseball player for the Arizona State Sun Devils
