= Tempe Union High School District =

School district in Maricopa County, Arizona

Tempe Union High School District #213

Location
- 500 West Guadalupe Road; Tempe, Arizona 85283

District information
- Type: Public
- Motto: “Excellence in Teaching and Learning”
- Established: 1908
- Superintendent: Dr. Stacia Wilson
- Budget: TBD

Students and staff
- Students: 13,260

Other information
- Website: http://www.tempeunion.org

The Tempe Union High School District is a school district of high schools in Tempe, Arizona, USA. Its service area includes almost all of Tempe, the portion of Chandler west of the Loop 101, Guadalupe, the Gila River Indian Community in Maricopa County, and the Ahwatukee area of Phoenix (the same areas served by the Tempe Elementary School District and the Kyrene School District, both of which feed into Tempe Union).

The district operates six comprehensive high schools and an online school, as well as various specialized programs.

Gifted academies are located at both McClintock High School (Peggy Payne Academy) and Mountain Pointe High School (Pride's Peak). Tempe High School offers the International Baccalaureate program.

During the 2023/2024 school year, the District operated the Innovation Center, which featured project-based learning and allowed students to earn high school credit solving real world problems.

== Governing board members ==
- Armando Montero (President)
- Amanda Steele (Vice President)
- Nicole Gutierrez Miller
- Andres Barraza
- Berdetta Hodge

== Schools ==
High schools in Tempe Union HSD
School	Corona del Sol	Desert Vista	Marcos de Niza	McClintock	Mountain Pointe	Tempe High School
Location	Tempe	Phoenix	Tempe	Tempe	Phoenix	Tempe
Opened	1977	1996	1971	1964	1991	1908, 1953 (current site)
Colors	Orange, yellow, black	Blue, gold	Brown, gold	Cardinal red, navy blue	Maroon, gold	Blue, white
Mascot	Aztecs	Thunder	Padres	Chargers	Pride	Buffalo
Principal	Nathan Kleve	Stacy White	Noe Ochoa	Mark Gorman	Tomika Banks	Adam Johnson
Athletic conference	6A	6A	4A	5A	5A	4A
Enrollment	2595	2835	1327	1726	1471	1478

== Feeder elementary school districts ==
- Tempe
- Kyrene

== Controversies ==
=== Allegations of records falsification ===
In 2001, then registrar of Desert Vista High School, Jane Jones, accused the school's principal at the time, Joe McDonald, of approaching three teachers at the schools to change the grades for a student-athlete who was being recruited, but was ineligible to compete at a Division I school. McDonald allegedly approached the teachers after was asked by then School District Superintendent, James Buchanan, to see what can be done to help the student. School district administrators admitted four years later, in 2005, that grades were changed for the softball student-athlete two months after her graduation, after which she was cleared by the National Collegiate Athletic Association to play at Texas A&M University–Corpus Christi.

In 2002, Jones was given her first negative evaluation of her career, and was subsequently fired on McDonald's recommendation. Following her termination, Jones filed a wrongful termination lawsuit under the state's whistleblower protection law, alleging that she was fired because McDonald said she was "not a team player." Subsequently, Jones claimed the school district officials also engaged in retaliation following her dismissal by claiming she was not eligible for rehiring to an investigator working for a California-based reference checking company, thus allegedly implying she has committed wrongdoing. Arizona school districts have no power to determine rehire eligibility, as only the state's Board of Education has the authority to suspend or revoke a person's teaching credentials.

A $140,000 settlement between the district and Jones was approved by a judge in 2006.

=== Alleged preferential treatment of student-athletes ===
In 2004, local newspaper East Valley Tribune reported that a former Desert Vista High School varsity football player, Chris Snow, claimed he was paid by the school district to tutor other student athletes on the team, and in the case of one football player he helped tutor, Snow did 70% to 80% of the work for the player, due to an arrangement made to ensure the player remains eligible for football.

District officials say while the district has a peer tutor program, the district does not pay tutors. The East Valley Tribune, however, claims that Snow's allegations were confirmed by two other sources, which were not identified by name.

== See also ==
- Chandler Unified School District
- Tempe Elementary School District
- Kyrene School District
