= Egelsee =

Egelsee may refer to lakes:

== Austria ==
- Egelsee (Kärnten) at Spittal an der Drau, Carinthia
- Egelsee (Tyrol) at Kufstein, Tyrol
- Egelsee (Unterach) at Unterach, Upper Austria

== Switzerland ==
- Egelsee (Aargau) at Bergdietikon, Canton of Aargau
- Egelsee (Bern) in the City of Bern
- Egelsee (Bubikon) at Bubikon, Canton of Zürich
- Ägelsee, also called Egelsee, at Zeiningen, Canton of Aargau
