= Maddingley Mine =

Mine in Victoria, Australia

Coordinates: 37°42′19″S 144°26′22″E

Maddingley Mine is a mine near Bacchus Marsh Railway Station, Victoria, Australia, that contains a concentration of a particular brown coal (lignite) formation called Leonardite. A relatively high altitude formation, Maddingley brown coal is distinguished as having 60% moisture content and a rich fulvic acid and humic acid content. A declared strategic State mining reserve, the estimated 400 million tonne deposit at Maddingley is the largest of three known deposits of high value Leonardite in the world, the others occurring in Mexico and Germany.

== History ==
The Maddingley brown coal deposit was surveyed by the 1930s. In the early 1940s brown coal was mined and transported in large quantities by rail from the nearby Rowsley Station, with dedicated trains running between Maddingley and the Australian Paper Manufacturers (APM Siding) at Fairfield, Melbourne. The coal was used to fire boilers at the APM paper mill, with 400 tonnes (440 short tons) of coal per day transferred in two trains per day. This traffic continued until the late 1970s when the boilers were converted to natural gas firing.

From the 1970s to the late 1980s coal from the mine was used to fuel local boilers at the CRA/Visy cardboard manufacturing facility located at JBD Business Park, located adjacent to Rowsley Station. The cardboard plant was decommissioned by 1990. The mine was subsequently acquired by the Calleja Group, a family owned waste management and transport company, primarily as an EPA licensed landfill for construction and demolition and, commercial and industrial waste . By 1994 the Calleja Group had acquired ownership of a methodology to create densified coal. The company invested in the application of Maddingley brown coal as a soil conditioner and natural fertiliser replacement for super phosphate, and the development of bench test equipment to produce batch samples of densified coal. Around 1997 the working technology to achieve densified coal became known as the Coldry Process.

== See also ==
- Energy value of coal
- Leonardite
- Densified coal
- Refined coal
- Black coal equivalent
