= Jamal Hinton and Wanda Dench =

American friends known for celebrating Thanksgiving

Jamal Hinton (born 1999) and Wanda Dench (born 1956 or 1957), the latter referred to as Thanksgiving Grandma, are friends who went viral in 2016. Dench, a grandmother from the U.S. state of Arizona, accidentally texted an invitation for Thanksgiving dinner to the wrong number. The text was received by Hinton, then a 16-year-old highschooler at Desert Vista High School. The two had never met previously. Hinton jokingly accepted the invitation, which started an annual tradition of the two celebrating the holiday together.

== Background and first Thanksgiving ==
In 2016, Wanda Dench sent a group text to her family members to invite them to dinner on Thanksgiving. She was not informed that her grandson's number had changed. Jamal Hinton had recently been assigned this number, and as a result, was included in the invitation.

Hinton asked who the sender was, and Dench replied that it was his grandmother. Hinton was skeptical and asked for a picture of Dench, which confirmed their non-relation. Dench reaffirmed the invitation after Hinton replied, "Can I still get a plate tho?". Hinton published the screenshots of the conversation on Twitter, where it was shared over 200,000 times that week. Dench's phone number was unobscured, and she received about 600 additional texts from strangers.

Hinton accepted the invitation, and joined Dench's family for Thanksgiving dinner that year. The duo quickly became friends, and affirmed there was no generational gap or awkward moments. Dench explained that her father was in the military, as was her husband. Because she had to frequently move, she was comfortable getting to know strangers. Hinton, a young black man, later stated that his initial friendship with Dench, an older white woman, "offered a holiday reprieve" from a racially tense election year.

== Later celebrations (2017–present) ==
The two began regular correspondence, with Dench offering life and career advice. Hinton, along with his girlfriend, again attended Thanksgiving dinner with Dench's family in 2017. The tradition continued in 2018. In 2019, dinner was hosted by Hinton's family for the first time.

In April 2020, Wanda's husband Lonnie died from COVID-19. There was an outpouring of support, with video messages sent to the family from around the world. The Thanksgiving tradition continued as a small, socially distanced gathering before the holiday that year. That December, Hinton and Dench raffled off a PlayStation 5 and an opportunity to join them for dinner.

In 2021, the two again met for Thanksgiving dinner. It was announced in December that Netflix was producing a movie about their story, titled "The Thanksgiving Text". The screenplay is to be written by Abdul Williams. In a joint statement, Hinton and Dench said that they hope the film will "inspire more people to reach out and make connections that they wouldn't ordinarily make".

In 2022, the tradition continued. It was preceded by Dench getting her first tattoo, with Hinton accompanying her to the appointment. The two launched a black water business that year.

In 2023, Hinton and Dench appeared as a team to compete on the TBS game show The Cube. The eighth annual Thanksgiving dinner was sponsored by Airbnb, with the promotion allowing for two selected winners to stay in Dench's home and join them for the holiday. They were joined on the holiday by one guest.

In October 2024, as part of Breast Cancer Awareness Month, Dench made a statement that she had been diagnosed with breast cancer and was undergoing chemotherapy. Because of her treatment, she was unable to join Hinton in-person for Thanksgiving. The two opted to video call instead.

In November 2025, Hinton and Dench announced a partnership with canned vegetable company Green Giant for their 10th Thanksgiving via Hinton's X account.
