= Fungal extracellular enzyme activity =

Enzymes produced by fungi and secreted outside their cells

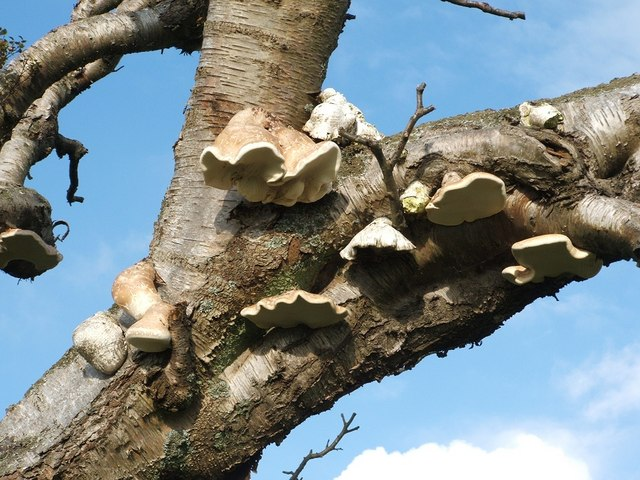
Birch polypore (Piptoporus betulinus) - geograph.org.uk - 1553987

Extracellular enzymes or exoenzymes are synthesized inside the cell and then secreted outside the cell, where their function is to break down complex macromolecules into smaller units to be taken up by the cell for growth and assimilation. These enzymes degrade complex organic matter such as cellulose and hemicellulose into simple sugars that enzyme-producing organisms use as a source of carbon, energy, and nutrients. Grouped as hydrolases, lyases, oxidoreductases and transferases, these extracellular enzymes control soil enzyme activity through efficient degradation of biopolymers.

Plant residues, animals and microorganisms enter the dead organic matter pool upon senescence and become a source of nutrients and energy for other organisms. Extracellular enzymes target macromolecules such as carbohydrates (cellulases), lignin (oxidases), organic phosphates (phosphatases), amino sugar polymers (chitinases) and proteins (proteases) and break them down into soluble sugars that are subsequently transported into cells to support heterotrophic metabolism.

Biopolymers are structurally complex and require the combined actions of a community of diverse microorganisms and their secreted exoenzymes to depolymerize the polysaccharides into easily assimilable monomers. These microbial communities are ubiquitous in nature, inhabiting both terrestrial and aquatic ecosystems. The cycling of elements from dead organic matter by heterotrophic soil microorganisms is essential for nutrient turnover and energy transfer in terrestrial ecosystems. Exoenzymes also aid digestion in the guts of ruminants, termites, humans and herbivores. By hydrolyzing plant cell wall polymers, microbes release energy that has the potential to be used by humans as biofuel. Other human uses include waste water treatment, composting and bioethanol production.

== Factors influencing extracellular enzyme activity ==
Extracellular enzyme production supplements the direct uptake of nutrients by microorganisms and is linked to nutrient availability and environmental conditions. The varied chemical structure of organic matter requires a suite of extracellular enzymes to access the carbon and nutrients embedded in detritus. Microorganisms differ in their ability to break down these different substrates and few organisms have the potential to degrade all the available plant cell wall materials. To detect the presence of complex polymers, some exoenzymes are produced constitutively at low levels, and expression is upregulated when the substrate is abundant. This sensitivity to the presence of varying concentrations of substrate allows fungi to respond dynamically to the changing availability of specific resources. Benefits of exoenzyme production can also be lost after secretion because the enzymes are liable to denature, degrade or diffuse away from the producer cell.

Enzyme production and secretion is an energy intensive process and, because it consumes resources otherwise available for reproduction, there is evolutionary pressure to conserve those resources by limiting production. Thus, while most microorganisms can assimilate simple monomers, degradation of polymers is specialized, and few organisms can degrade recalcitrant polymers like cellulose and lignin. Each microbial species carries specific combinations of genes for extracellular enzymes and is adapted to degrade specific substrates. In addition, the expression of genes that encode for enzymes is typically regulated by the availability of a given substrate. For example, presence of a low-molecular weight soluble substrate such as glucose will inhibit enzyme production by repressing the transcription of associated cellulose-degrading enzymes.

Environmental conditions such as soil pH, soil temperature, moisture content, and plant litter type and quality have the potential to alter exoenzyme expression and activity. Variations in seasonal temperatures can shift metabolic needs of microorganisms in synchrony with shifts in plant nutrient requirements. Agricultural practices such as fertilizer amendments and tillage can change the spatial distribution of resources, resulting in altered exoenzyme activity in the soil profile. Introduction of moisture exposes soil organic matter to enzyme catalysis and also increases loss of soluble monomers via diffusion. Additionally, osmotic shock resulting from water potential changes can impact enzyme activities as microbes redirect energy from enzyme production to synthesizing osmolytes to maintain cellular structures.

== Extracellular enzyme activity in fungi during plant decomposition ==
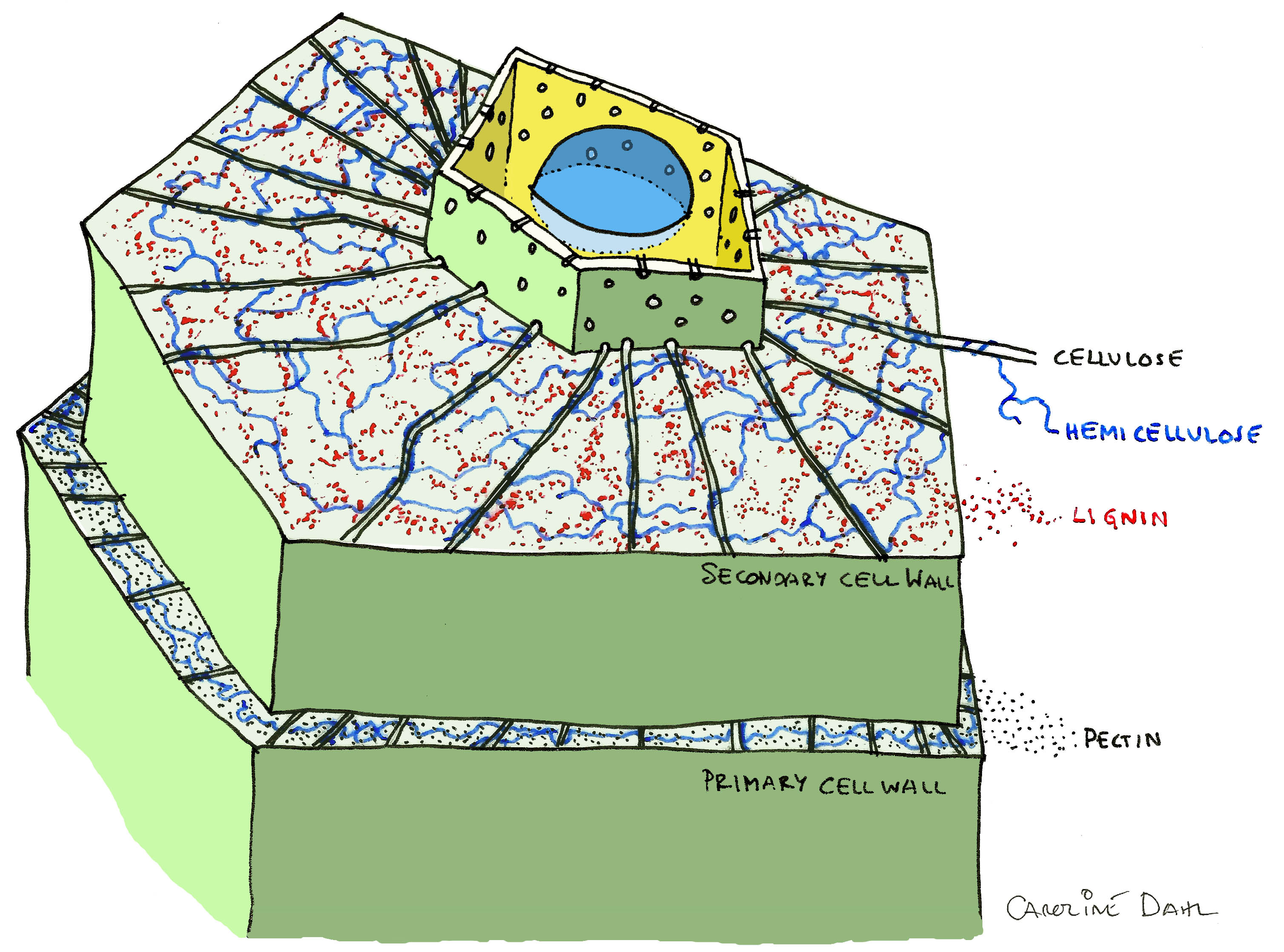
Plant cell showing primary and secondary wall by CarolineDahl

Most of the extracellular enzymes involved in polymer degradation in leaf litter and soil have been ascribed to fungi. By adapting their metabolism to the availability of varying amounts of carbon and nitrogen in the environment, fungi produce a mixture of oxidative and hydrolytic enzymes to efficiently break down lignocelluloses like wood. During plant litter degradation, cellulose and other labile substrates are degraded first followed by lignin depolymerization with increased oxidative enzyme activity and shifts in microbial community composition.

In plant cell walls, cellulose and hemicellulose is embedded in a pectin scaffold that requires pectin degrading enzymes, such as polygalacturonases and pectin lyases to weaken the plant cell wall and uncover hemicellulose and cellulose to further enzymatic degradation. Degradation of lignin is catalyzed by enzymes that oxidase aromatic compounds, such as phenol oxidases, peroxidases and laccases. Many fungi have multiple genes encoding lignin-degrading exoenzymes.

Most efficient wood degraders are saprotrophic ascomycetes and basidiomycetes. Traditionally, these fungi are classified as brown rot (Ascomycota and Basidiomycota), white rot (Basidiomycota) and soft rot (Ascomycota) based on the appearance of the decaying material. Brown rot fungi preferentially attack cellulose and hemicellulose; while white rot fungi degrade cellulose and lignin. To degrade cellulose, basidiomycetes employ hydrolytic enzymes, such as endoglucanases, cellobiohydrolase and β-glucosidase. Production of endoglucanases is widely distributed among fungi and cellobiohydrolases have been isolated in multiple white-rot fungi and in plant pathogens. β-glucosidases are secreted by many wood-rotting fungi, both white and brown rot fungi, mycorrhizal fungi and in plant pathogens. In addition to cellulose, β-glucosidases can cleave xylose, mannose and galactose.

In white-rot fungi such as Phanerochaete chrysosporium, expression of manganese-peroxidase is induced by the presence of manganese, hydrogen peroxide and lignin, while laccase is induced by availability of phenolic compounds. Production of lignin-peroxidase and manganese-peroxidase is the hallmark of basidiomycetes and is often used to assess basidiomycete activity, especially in biotechnology applications. Most white-rot species also produce laccase, a copper-containing enzyme that degrades polymeric lignin and humic substances.

Brown-rot basidiomycetes are most commonly found in coniferous forests, and are so named because they degrade wood to leave a brown residue that crumbles easily. Preferentially attacking hemicellulose in wood, followed by cellulose, these fungi leave lignin largely untouched. The decayed wood of soft-rot Ascomycetes is brown and soft. One soft-rot Ascomycete, Trichoderma reesei, is used extensively in industrial applications as a source for cellulases and hemicellulases. Laccase activity has been documented in T. reesei, in some species in the Aspergillus genus and in freshwater ascomycetes.

== Measuring fungal extracellular enzyme activity in soil, plant litter, and other environmental samples ==
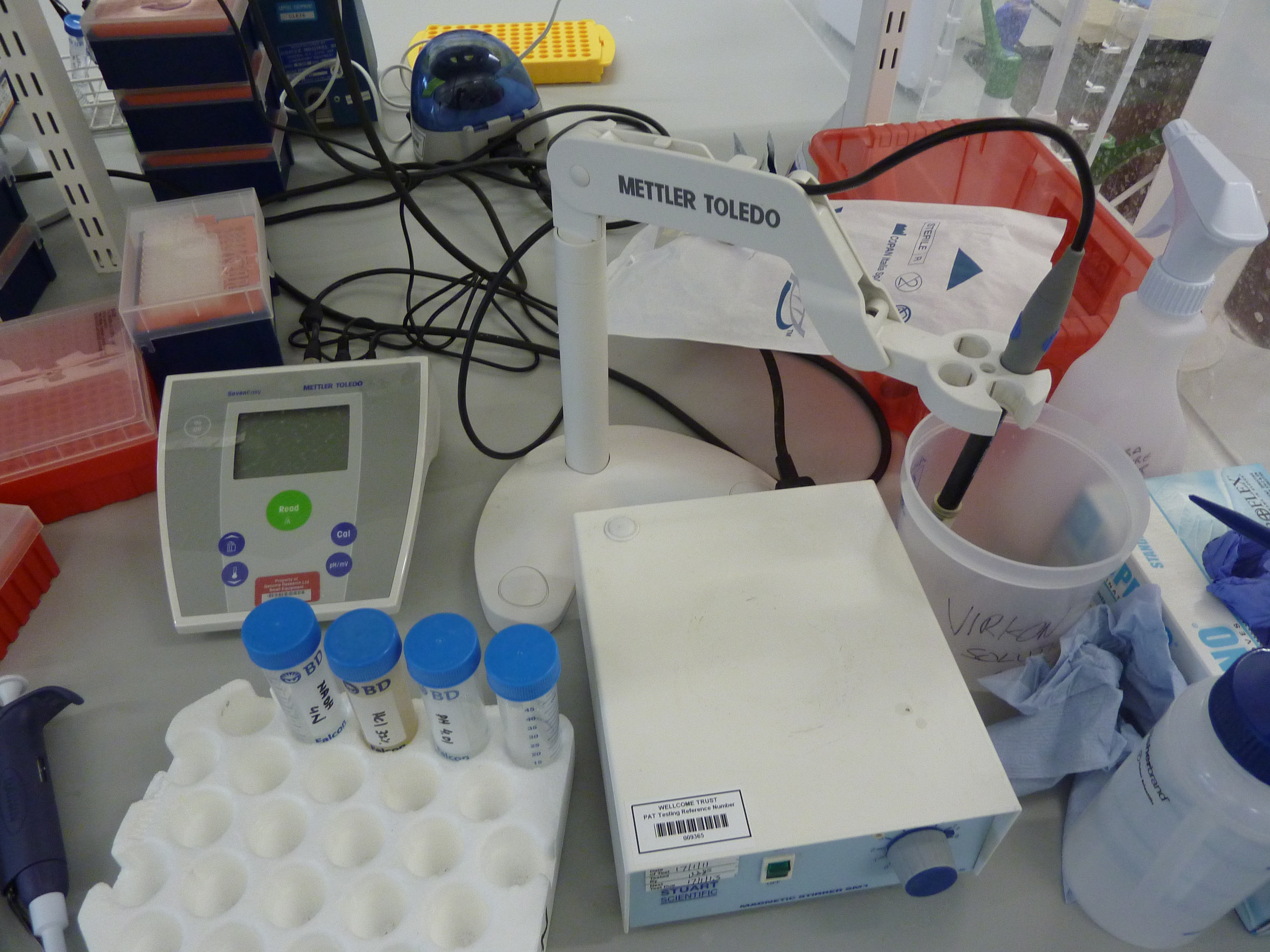
Electronic PH meter

Methods for estimating soil enzyme activities involve sample harvesting prior to analysis, mixing of samples with buffers and the use of substrate. Results can be influenced by: sample transport from field-site, storage methods, pH conditions for assay, substrate concentrations, temperature at which the assay is run, sample mixing and preparation.

For hydrolytic enzymes, colorimetric assays are required that use a p-nitrophenol (p-NP)-linked substrate, or fluorometric assays that use a 4-methylumbelliferone (MUF)-linked substrate.

Oxidative enzymes such as phenol oxidase and peroxidase mediate lignin degradation and humification. Phenol oxidase activity is quantified by oxidation of L-3, 4-dihydoxyphenylalanine (L-DOPA), pyrogallol (1, 2, 3-trihydroxybenzene), or ABTS (2, 2’-azino-bis (3-ethylbenzothiazoline-6-sulphonic acid). Peroxidase activity is measured by running the phenol oxidase assay concurrently with another assay with L-DOPA and hydrogen peroxide (H_{2}O_{2}) added to every sample. The difference in measurements between the two assays is indicative of peroxidase activity. Enzyme assays typically apply proxies that reveal exo-acting activities of enzymes. Exo-acting enzymes hydrolyze substrates from the terminal position. While activity of endo-acting enzymes which break down polymers midchain need to be represented by other substrate proxies. New enzyme assays aim to capture the diversity of enzymes and assess the potential activity of them in a more clear way.

With newer technologies available, molecular methods to quantify abundance of enzyme-coding genes are used to link enzymes with their producers in soil environments. Transcriptome analyses are now employed to examine genetic controls of enzyme expression, while proteomic methods can reveal the presence of enzymes in the environment and link to the organisms producing them.

Process	Enzyme	Substrate
Cellulose-degradation	Cellobiohydrolase β-glucosidase	pNP, MUF
Hemicellulose-degradation	β-glucosidases Esterases	pNP, MUF
Polysaccharide-degradation	α-glucosidases N-acetylglucosaminidase	pNP, MUF
Lignin-degradation	Mn-peroxidase Laccase (polyphenol oxidase) Peroxidase	Pyrogallol, L-DOPA, ABTS L-DOPA, ABTS

== Applications of fungal extracellular enzymes ==
Application	Enzymes & their uses
Paper production	Cellulases – improve paper quality and smooth fibers Laccases – soften paper and improving bleaching
Biofuel generation	Cellulases – for production of renewable liquid fuels
Dairy industry	Lactase – part of β-glucosidase family of enzymes and can break down lactose to glucose and galactose Pectinases – in the manufacture of yogurt
Brewing industry Black Sheep Brewery Tour	Beer production and malting
Fruit and jam manufacturing	Pectinases, cellulases – to clarify fruit juices and form jams
Bioremediation	Laccases – as biotransformers to remove nonionic surfactants
Waste water treatment	Peroxidases - removal of pollutants by precipitation
Sludge treatment	Lipases - used in degradation of particulate organic matter
Phytopathogen management	Hydrolytic enzymes produced by fungi, e.g. Fusarium graminearum, pathogen on cereal grains resulting in economic losses in agriculture
Resource management Water retention	Soil aggregates and water infiltration influence enzyme activity
Soil fertility and plant production	Use of enzyme activity as indicator of soil quality
Composting	Impacts of composting municipal solid waste on soil microbial activity
Soil organic matter stability	Impact of temperature and soil respiration on enzymatic activity and its effect on soil fertility
Climate change indicators Impact on soil processes	Potential increase in enzymatic activity leading to elevated CO2 emissions
Quantifying global warming outcomes	Predictions based on soil organic matter decomposition and strategies for mitigation
Impact of elevated CO2 on enzyme activity & decomposition	Understanding the implication of microbial responses and its impact on terrestrial ecosystem functioning

== See also ==
- Enzymes
- Enzyme kinetics
- Enzyme assay
- List of enzymes
- Decomposition
- Plant litter
- Nutrient cycle
