= Potassium humate =

Names
- Other names Humic acids, potassium salts

Identifiers
CAS Number	68514-28-3
ECHA InfoCard	100.064.553
EC Number	271-030-1
CompTox Dashboard (EPA)	DTXSID3099200

Properties
Chemical formula	Variable
Molar mass	Variable
Appearance	Amorphous crystalline solid
- Except where otherwise noted, data are given for materials in their standard state (at 25 °C [77 °F], 100 kPa). Infobox references

Potassium humate is the potassium salt of humic acid. It is manufactured commercially by alkaline extraction of brown coal (lignite) leonardite and is used mainly as a soil conditioner.

== Extraction ==
The extraction is performed in water with the addition of potassium hydroxide (KOH), sequestering agents, and hydrotropic surfactants. Heat is used to increase the solubility of humic acids and hence more potassium humate can be extracted. The resulting liquid is dried to produce the amorphous crystalline like product which can then be added as a granule to fertilizer. The potassium humate granules by way of chemical extraction lose their hydrophobic properties and are now soluble.

== Quality ==
Depending on the source material, product quality varies. High quality oxidized lignite (brown coal), usually referred to as leonardite, is the best source material for extraction of large quantities of potassium humate. The less oxidized the coal, the less potassium humate extracted. Sources low in ash produce the best quality. Less oxidized brown coal contains a higher proportion of the insoluble humin fraction and along with peat which is lower in humic acid content and usually high in ash content requires separation by filtration or centrifugation to remove ash and humin. Peat is also high in non-humified organic matter that needs to be reduced to produce a high quality product. The benefit of peat is that it is usually 2-3 times higher in fulvic acid content, which are the low molecular weight fractions of humic acid that are high in oxygen containing functional groups and soluble at a low pH of <1. Fulvic acids have a higher cation exchange capacity and therefore have a higher chemical interaction with fertilizers and are able to form soluble chelates of trace metals.

== Uses ==
Potassium humate is used in agriculture as a fertilizer additive to increase the efficiency of fertilizers especially nitrogen- and phosphorus-based fertilizer inputs. Other salts of humic acid are manufactured, mainly sodium humate, which is used in animal health supplements. It also can be used in aquaculture.
