= Refined coal =

Solid fossil fuel

Refined coal is the product of coal-upgrading technology processes that remove moisture and certain pollutants from lower-rank coals such as sub-bituminous and lignite (brown) coals, raising their calorific values. Coal refining or upgrading technologies are typically pre-combustion treatments and processes that alter the characteristics of coal before it is burned. Pre-combustion coal-upgrading technologies aim to increase efficiency and reduce emissions when coal is burned. Depending on the situation, pre-combustion technology can be used in place of or as a supplement to post-combustion technologies to control emissions from coal-fueled boilers.

A primary benefit of refined coal is the capacity to reduce the net volume of carbon emissions that is currently emitted from power generators and would reduce the number of emissions that is proposed to be managed via emerging carbon sequestration methodologies. Refined coal technologies have primarily been developed in the United States.

== History and advantages ==
=== United States ===
Much of the coal in the western United States is known as "lower-rank" coal that falls under the categories of "sub-bituminous" and "lignite" coals. These coals have high moisture levels and can be 20% to 30% water. This relatively high moisture content compared to "higher rank" coals like bituminous and anthracite coals make lower-rank coals less efficient. The average heat content of sub-bituminous coal consumed in the United States is approximately 8,500 British thermal units (9,000 kJ) per pound. The K-Fuel(R) process uses heat and pressure to remove approximately 30 percent of the moisture from raw, low-rank coal and raises its thermal content to approximately 11,000 Btu per pound. In addition to raising the coal's heat value, a significant amount, up to 70 percent, of the elemental mercury in the coal is removed and, because of its higher efficiency, lower chloride and nitrogen oxides emissions are achieved on a per kilowatt hour generated basis.

The advantages of the refined coal process are more efficient transportation and the ability of utilities to switch to a fuel made of 100 percent refined coal or a blend of raw and refined coals in order to achieve lower emissions and greater efficiency. A disadvantage is that the industry requires significant subsidies. An examination of government figures show that in 2007, for every megawatt-hour generated, refined coal received $29.81 in federal support, solar power received $24.34, wind power received $23.37, and nuclear power received $1.59.

=== Australia ===
The Coldry Process coal-upgrading methodology was first developed in the Chemical Laboratory of Melbourne University by Dr B. A. John in the 1980s. The technology was sold in 1994 and developed to pilot demonstration at Maddingley Mine, Bacchus Marsh, Victoria, before being licensed for further commercialisation in 2005.

The State of Victoria contains approximately 25% of the world's known reserves of brown coal (lignite). This coal is also amongst the world's 'wettest' coal, with a typical moisture content of 60 per cent water by weight. High moisture content makes Victorian brown coal an inefficient fuel source and is the primary reason why the Hazelwood power station in the Latrobe Valley is regarded as the world's dirtiest coal-fired power station. The Coldry Process uses low-pressure mechanical shear to create a natural exothermic reaction within the coal that then naturally expels 80 per cent of the moisture content. Expelled moisture is then captured and recovered as distilled water. Victorian brown coal transformed by the Coldry Process has a raised thermal content of 5874 kcal/kg, which is comparable to most export-grade Australian black coal.

The advantage of the Coldry Process is its ability to allow power generators to switch to a blend of raw as mined brown coal and Coldry pellets to achieve lower emissions in existing inefficient boilers, or achieve substantially less emissions by introducing black coal boilers and using 100 per cent Coldry refined coal pellets as a black coal equivalent. The Coldry Process provides the added advantage of creating new revenue streams for power generators through the production of a product that can be exported to other countries as a replacement for black coal. Unlike other refined coal processes, the Coldry Process is a commercial methodology that does not require subsidy.

== Commercial development ==
=== United States ===
Evergreen Energy constructed a full-scale coal refinery near Gillette, Wyoming that began operation in late 2005. Designed originally to be a commercial plant, the facility encountered design and operational problems. Evergreen idled the facility in March 2008 and instead used the plant as a process development platform with its engineering, construction and procurement contractor Bechtel Power Corporation.

Evergreen is now seeking to construct a coal refinery using the improved Bechtel design at locations in the Midwestern United States and in Asia.

=== Australia ===
A full-scale 16,000 tonne per annum pilot demonstration plant was constructed at Maddingley Mine near Bacchus Marsh, Victoria, that began operation in early 2004. A water recovery process was added with Victorian Government funding in 2007.

=== China ===
GBCE has built and is now operating the world's first industrial-scale coal-upgrading facility. It has capacity to process 1 MTPA of coal feedstock and is located in Holingol, Inner Mongolia, the largest lignite-producing region in China. The coal is typically high moisture (35 – 40% TM) and 3200 – 3400 kcal gar. Depending on market requirements, it produces 5000–5500 kcal coal (gar) with greatly reduced moisture content (< 10% gar). The plant uses LCP coal-upgrading technology, which is a pyrolytic process that employs heat and pressure in an oxygen-free environment to continue the coalification process that occurs naturally in the earth. The processed coal by this technology is hydrophobic and transportable, which means it will not reabsorb moisture or break up into powder during transportation.

== Similar technologies ==
Several similar technologies have been researched, developed, and tested in Victoria, Australia, such as the densified coal technology developed to alter the chemical bonds of brown coal to create a product that is cleaner, stable (not prone to spontaneous combustion), exportable and of sufficiently high calorific value to be a black coal equivalent.

=== Densified coal ===
Densified coal is the product of the Coldry Process coal upgrading technology that removes moisture from low-rank coals such as sub-bituminous and lignite/brown coal. The densification process raises the calorific value of low-rank coal to equal or exceed that of many export-grade black coals. Densified coal resulting from the Coldry Process is regarded as a black coal equivalent or replacement for black coal.

The Coldry Process is a patented coal upgrading technology being developed in Victoria, Australia by Environmental Clean Technologies Limited based on 'brown coal densification'. It has been developed specifically to improve low-rank brown coal (lignite) and some forms of sub-bituminous coal by removing the majority of the naturally occurring moisture content; harden and densify the coal; raise the calorific value of the coal; and transform the coal into a stable (lower spontaneous combustion risk), exportable black coal equivalent product for use by black coal fired power generators to produce electricity or as a feedstock for downstream processes such as coal-to-gas, oil and other high value chemicals.

The Coldry Process evolved from theoretical and test work in the Department of Organic Chemistry, University of Melbourne, Victoria, in collaboration with CRA Advanced Technical Development, Melbourne in 1989. This work was based on earlier theoretical work around Densified coal undertaken by the Department of Organic Chemistry, University of Melbourne in 1980-81.

The possibility of creating densified coal was identified following observations made at the Maddingley Mine near Bacchus Marsh, Victoria. The mine operator observed that hardened bitumen-like road surfaces formed naturally soon after rain events when trucks had churned up brown coal fines with moisture when they entered and left the mine. In the days that followed a rain event the road surfaces at the mine would harden like tarmac and no longer absorb water. Dr Johns and colleagues identified that a process of low-mechanical shear had occurred where brown coal mixed with a small amount of moisture and subject to low-level mechanical shear had substantially destroyed the coal porous structure and triggered a mild natural exothermic reaction process within the coal leading to the mobilisation and subsequent evaporation of its moisture content.

=== Black coal equivalent ===
Black coal equivalent (BCE) is an export coal product derived from the Coldry process, a patented coal upgrading technology operated by Environmental Clean Technologies Limited, in Victoria, Australia. The Coldry Process is applied to brown coal (lignite) with a typical moisture content of 60 per cent by weight and transforms the coal into a densified coal product of equal or better calorific value (5,800 kcal/kg) to typical export quality black coal, with less ash and sulfur content. Black coal equivalent derived from brown coal is ostensibly a 'cleaner' burning coal fuel than most black coals.

Densified coal as a black coal equivalent product derived from brown coal was first discovered by R. B. Johns and colleagues at the Organic Chemistry laboratory at Melbourne University following observations made at the Maddingley Mine near Bacchus Marsh, Victoria. Johns and colleagues identified that a process of low-mechanical shear applied to brown coal mixed with a small amount of moisture would trigger a natural exothermic reaction process within the coal, leading to the expulsion of its moisture content. The process fundamentally alters micro chemical bonds within the coal, naturally reducing moisture content to around 11 per cent; boosting calorific value to around 5800 kcal/kg; and creating a ‘densified coal’ product that is hydrophobic, no longer prone to spontaneous combustion, and readily transportable.

== See also ==
- Bituminous coal – Collective term for higher-quality coal
- Bergius process – Method to produce liquid hydrocarbons as fuel
- Coal assay – Measurement of properties of coal
- Coldry Process – Solid fossil fuel
- Coke fuel – Coal product used in making steel
- Densified coal – Solid fossil fuel
- Energy value of coal
- Fischer–Tropsch process – Chemical reactions that convert carbon monoxide and hydrogen into liquid hydrocarbons
- Karrick process
- Leonardite – Soft waxy, black or brown, shiny, vitreous mineraloid
- Lignite – Soft, brown, combustible, sedimentary rock
- Maddingley Mine – Mine in Victoria, Australia
- Orders of magnitude (specific energy density) – Physical quantity representing energy content per unit mass
- List of CO_{2} emitted per million Joule of energy from various fuels – Heat-trapping gas in an atmosphere
