= IHSS =

IHSS may refer to:

- Honduran Social Security Institute (Instituto Hondureño de Seguridad Social in Spanish), social security in Honduras
- Idiopathic hypertrophic subaortic stenosis, an older term for hypertrophic obstructive cardiomyopathy (HOCM)
- International Humic Substances Society, a scientific society that seeks to advance knowledge and research of natural organic matter
- In-Home Supportive Services (IHSS) program, in-home help for aged, blind, and disabled people as an alternative to out-of-home care in California
