= Penicillium cremeogriseum =

Scientific classification
- Kingdom: Fungi
- Division: Ascomycota
- Class: Eurotiomycetes
- Order: Eurotiales
- Family: Aspergillaceae
- Genus: Penicillium
- Species: P. cremeogriseum

Binomial name
- Penicillium cremeogriseum Chalabuda 1950

Type strain
- ATCC 18320, ATCC 18323, CBS 223.66, FRR 1734, FRR 2289, IJFM 5011, IMI 197492, NRRL 3389, VKM F-1034

Species of fungus

Penicillium cremeogriseum is an anamorph species of the genus of Penicillium which produces fulvic acid. Penicillium cremeogriseum was isolated from forest soil in Kyiv, Ukraine.

== See also ==
- List of Penicillium species
