= Biotic material =

Any material originating from living organisms

Life timeline
← / Earth formed; ← / Earliest water; ← / LUCA; ← / Earliest fossils; ← / Great Oxygenation Event; ← / Sexual reproduction; ← / Earliest fungi; ← / Neoproterozoic oxygenation event; ← / Ediacaran biota; ← / Cambrian explosion; ← / Earliest tetrapods; ← / Earliest hominoid
(million years ago)

Biotic material or biological derived material is any material that originates from living organisms. Most such materials contain carbon and are capable of decay.

The earliest form of life on Earth arose at least 3.5 billion years ago. Earlier physical evidences of life include graphite, a biogenic substance, in 3.7 billion-year-old metasedimentary rocks discovered in southwestern Greenland, as well as "remains of biotic life" found in 4.1 billion-year-old rocks in Western Australia. Earth's biodiversity has expanded continually except when interrupted by mass extinctions. Although scholars estimate that over 99 percent of all species of life (over five billion) that ever lived on Earth are extinct, there are still an estimated 10–14 million extant species, of which about 1.2 million have been documented and over 86% have not yet been described.

Examples of biotic materials are wood, straw, humus, manure, bark, crude oil, cotton, spider silk, chitin, fibrin, and bone.

The use of biotic materials and processed biotic materials (bio-based material) as alternative natural materials over synthetics is widespread with those who are environmentally conscious because such materials are usually biodegradable, renewable, and the processing is commonly understood and has minimal environmental impact. However, not all biotic materials are used in an environmentally friendly way, such as those that require high levels of processing, are harvested unsustainably, or are used to produce carbon emissions.

When the source of the recently living material has little importance to the product produced, such as in the production of biofuels, biotic material is simply called biomass. Many fuel sources may have biological sources and may be divided roughly into fossil fuels and biofuel.

In soil science, biotic material is often referred to as organic matter. Biotic materials in soil include humic substances such as humic acids, fulvic acids and humin. Some biotic material may not be considered to be organic matter if it is low in organic compounds, such as a clam's shell, which is an essential component of the exoskeleton of bivalve mollusks made of calcium carbonate (CaCO_{3}), but contains little organic carbon.

== See also ==
- Abiotic component
- Biomass
