= Egelsee (Kärnten) =

Lake in the Carinthia, Austria

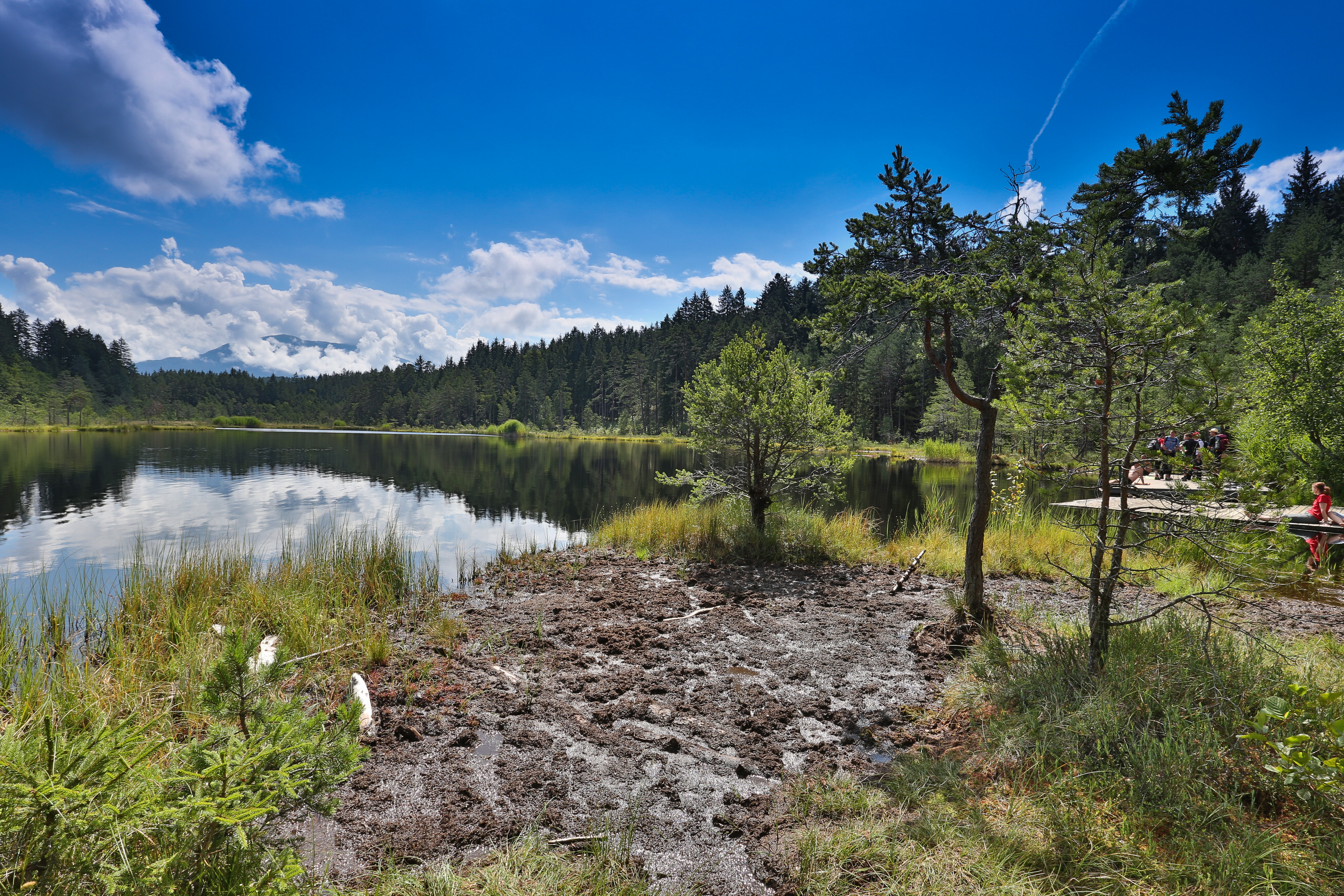
- View to the east with Mirnock massif

- Location within Kärnten
- Location: Carinthia
- Coordinates: 46.7842°N 13.5610°E
- Lake type: mire lake
- Primary outflows: to Drava River
- Basin countries: Austria
- Surface area: 9.35 ha (23.1 acres)
- Surface elevation: 650 m (2,130 ft)

Egelsee (formerly also called Ecksee) is a mire lake in Carinthia, Austria. The lake and its environment are part of a protected landscape area.

== Geography ==
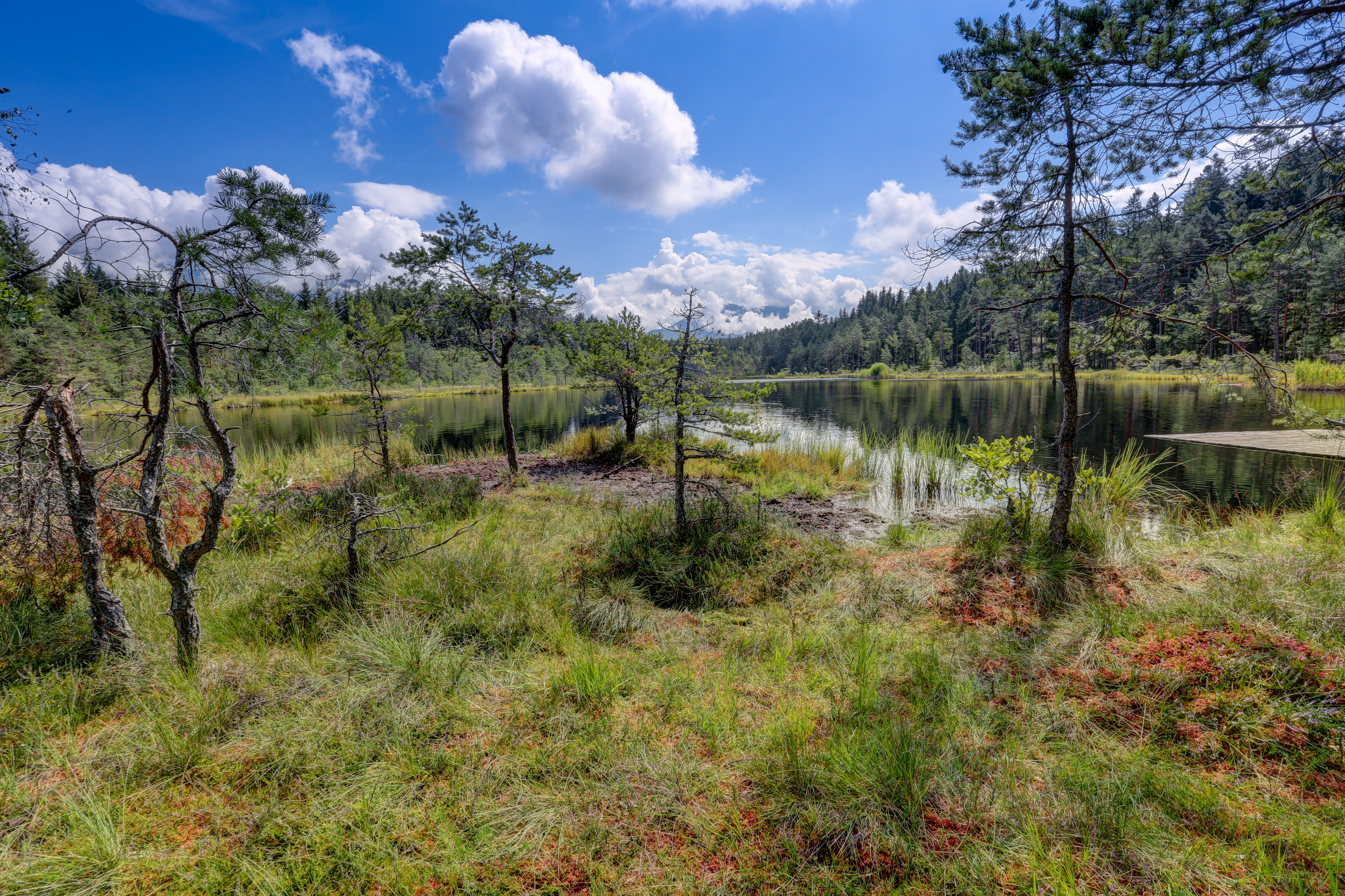
Swampy shores, view to east

The small is located on the plateau of a hill chain, which stretches between the southern shore of Millstätter See at an elevation of 588 m (1,929 ft) and the lower Drava valley near Spittal an der Drau down to 530 m (1,740 ft). The range on the southwestern rim of the Nock Mountains was honed by the last glacial period (Würm), it is about 2 km (1.2 mi) wide and 13 km (8.1 mi) long. The Egelsee on top can be reached via hiking trails through the surrounding forests. Open air bathing is possible.

The mire lake with an area of 9.35 hectares is completely surrounded by floating grass. Due to its location in the midst of a vast moor his water colour is deep brown. The acidic waters are surrounded by quaking bogs, mostly of peat mosses. Sundews, bladderworts, alpenrose, hare's-tail cottongrass, bog-rosemary, and bog bilberry also occur. All stages of bog formation can be observed on Egelsee. The local fauna include cyclops copepods as well as common frogs and water frogs, with large spawn clusters covering the shoreline water surface in spring. Originally there were no fish in this lake.

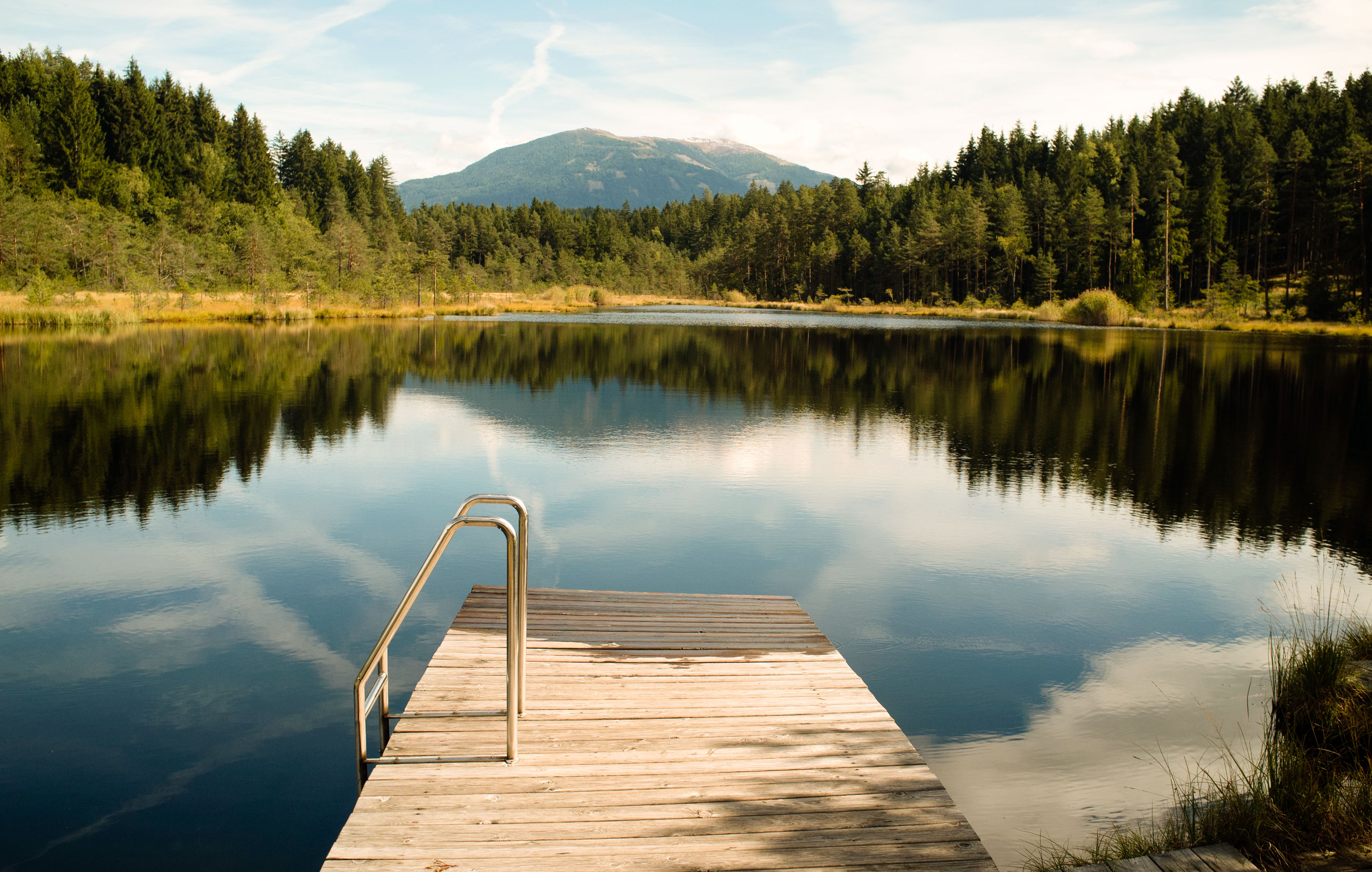
Swimming at the lake

The surrounding landscape conservation area is located in the municipal areas of Seeboden, Spittal and Ferndorf. The shaded southern shore of Lake Millstatt is largely in its natural state, as opposed to the densely settled northern shore, and virtually uninhabited. The historic route from Millstatt Abbey into the Drava Valley - Lake Millstatt was thereby crossed by boat - went some distance to the east past the Egelsee. Remnants of the old flagged stone pathway are still visible.
