= International Humic Substances Society =

The International Humic Substances Society is a scientific society with a focus on research into natural organic matter (NOM) in soil and water.

== History ==
The International Humic Substances Society was founded in Denver, Colorado, USA, on September 11, 1981 by scientists who saw a need for a society to bring together scientists in the coal, soil, and water with interest in humic substances, and to provide opportunities for them to exchange ideas . As of 2023, the society has about 450 members in 24 country and regional chapters.

== Standard and reference sample collection ==
The International Humic Substances Society maintains a collection of standard and reference samples of humic and fulvic acids extracted and fractionated from leonardite, river water, a mineral soil, and peat, plus natural organic matter isolated from river water by reverse osmosis, without fractionation. These standards, which represent an important fraction of soil and water are sold to scientists around the world for use as standards in environmental and agricultural research, and have been used by scientists in approximately 40 countries for a wide variety studies.

== Support of humic sciences ==
The International Humic Substances Society convenes multidisciplinary biennial international conferences, which bring together scientists from the soil, and aquatic sciences. Some chapters also hold scientific conferences.

The society has financial grant programs to encourage the advancement of humic sciences. This includes scholarships for graduate students to travel to the international conferences and for student researchers to travel to research laboratories to gain knowledge on new laboratory techniques. The IHSS also makes research grants to early career researchers for studies in humic sciences.
