= Desert Vista High School =

Public school in Phoenix, Arizona

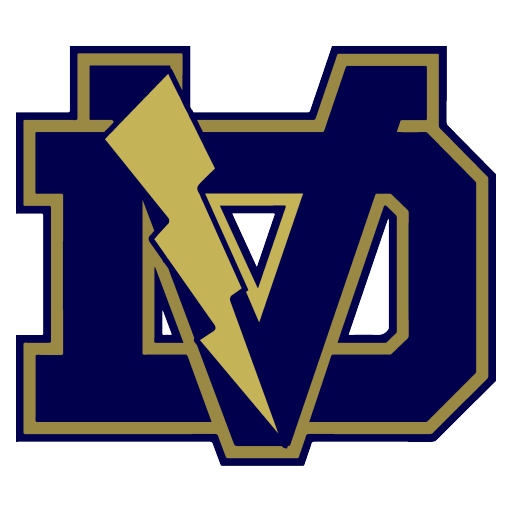

Location
- 16440 S. 32nd St. Phoenix, Arizona 85048; United States; 33°17′48″N 112°00′56″W

Information
- Type: Public
- School district: Tempe Union High School District
- NCES District ID: 0408340
- NCES School ID: 040834000680
- Principal: Stacy White
- Staff: 129.20 (FTE)
- Grades: 9–12
- Enrollment: 2,802 (2023–2024)
- Student to teacher ratio: 21.69
- Language: English
- Colors: Navy and Vegas gold
- Athletics conference: AIA 6A Conference
- Mascot: Thunder
- Website: Official Website

Desert Vista High School is a public high school located in the Ahwatukee area of Phoenix, Arizona. Opened in 1996, it is the second Tempe Union High School District (TUHSD) school in Ahwatukee and serves approximately 3,000 students.

== Academics ==
=== Statistics ===
During the 2020–2021 academic year, 2,779 students attended the school, constituting 21.6% of Tempe Union High School District's population, the school is noted to have a bigger proportion of White students than other comparable high schools, including Mountain Pointe High School. According to data from the 2020–2021 academic year, 58.1% of the school's student population are classified as White. Students classified as "Hispanics" form the second biggest demographic bloc, constituting 21.3% of the school's population.

In 2023, U.S. News & World Report noted that the school's Advanced Placement participation rate is 33% with a passage rate of 76%. In 2022, Desert Vista received an "A+" rating from the Arizona Department of Education with the highest score of any traditional, non-magnet high school. According to Public School Review, Desert Vista ranks within the top 10% in Arizona in math proficiency, reading proficiency, and graduation rate.

== Extracurricular activities ==
=== Athletics ===
Desert Vista is an Arizona Interscholastic Association (AIA) member school offering boys and girls sports complying with Title IX. Student athletes can participate in varsity, junior varsity, and freshmen only teams as well as individual sports under the AIA's 6A Conference. Desert Vista Athletics consist of several sports. Desert Vista has won many state championships across a wide variety of sports.

- Badminton
- Baseball - State Champions 1999, 2001
- Basketball (Boys and Girls) - State Champions (Boys) - 2008, 2020 (Girls) - 2014, 2023
- Cheer (Girls and Coed)
- Cross Country (Boys and Girls) - State Champions (Boys) - 2002, 2005, 2006, 2008, 2012, 2013, 2014, 2015, 2016, 2017, 2018, 2021 State Champions (Girls) - 1998, 2000, 2013, 2014, 2016, 2019, 2020
- Football - State Champions - 1998, 2011
- Golf (Boys and Girls) - State Champions (Boys) - 2016
- Ice hockey (Boys) - State Champions - 2023
- Lacrosse (Boys and Girls) - State Champions (Girls) - 2021
- Soccer (Boys and Girls) - State Champions (Boys) - 2002, 2005, 2006, 2018, 2022, 2025 (Girls) - 2005, 2016, 2025
- Softball
- Swim and Dive (Boys and Girls) - State Champions (Girls) - 2013, 2016, 2023 (Boys) - 2021
- Tennis (Boys and Girls)
- Track and field (Boys and Girls) - State Champions (Boys) - 2007, 2008, 2009, 2015 State Champions (Girls) - 1999, 2004
- Volleyball (Boys and Girls) - State Champions (Boys) - 2007, 2018 State Champions (Girls) 2014, 2015
- Wrestling

==== Speech and debate ====
In 2024, the Desert Vista High School Speech and Debate Team won its 19th state championship, which is the most in Arizona history.

==== Marching band ====
The Desert Vista Thunder Marching band has won many competitions, being 9-time champions for the state of Arizona. Marching band is a half semester, zero hour class and one semester of fine art credits can be earned by taking the course. The class can be worth one year of P.E. credit if taken for three years.

== Controversies ==
Desert Vista High School has been at the center of a number of controversies since its opening that have garnered local, national, and even international media attention.

=== Allegations of records falsification ===
In 2001, the school's registrar at the time, Jane Jones, accused then principal Joe McDonald of approaching three teachers at the schools to change the grades for a student-athlete who was being recruited, but was ineligible to compete at a Division I school. McDonald allegedly approached the teachers after being asked by then-Tempe Union High School District Superintendent James Buchanan to see what can be done to help the student. School district administrators admitted four years later, in 2005, that grades were changed for the softball student-athlete two months after her graduation, after which she was cleared by the National Collegiate Athletic Association to play at Texas A&M University–Corpus Christi.

In 2002, Jones was given her first negative evaluation of her career, and was subsequently fired on McDonald's recommendation. Following her termination, Jones filed a wrongful termination lawsuit under the state's whistleblower protection law, alleging that she was fired because McDonald said she was "not a team player." Subsequently, Jones claimed that school district officials also engaged in retaliation following her dismissal, by telling an investigator working for a reference checking company that she was not eligible for rehiring, thus allegedly implying she had committed wrongdoing. Arizona school districts have no power to determine rehire eligibility because only the state's Board of Education has the authority to suspend or revoke a person's teaching credentials. A $140,000 settlement between the district and Jones was approved by a judge in 2006.

=== Alleged preferential treatment of student-athletes ===
In 2004, the school's basketball program came under scrutiny after school records showed that a player did not attend 247 classes during the first three-quarters of the 2003–04 school year, yet remained eligible for varsity team. In the same story, the East Valley Tribune reported that a former school varsity football player claimed he was paid by the school district to tutor other student athletes on the team, and in the case of one football player he helped tutor, Snow claims he did 70% to 80% of the work for the player, in an arrangement made to ensure the player remains eligible for football.

District officials say while the district has a peer tutor program, the district does not pay tutors. The East Valley Tribune, however, claims that the student's allegations were confirmed by two other sources, which were not identified by name. He would later clarify his statement to the East Valley Tribune, and the district later investigated the basketball player's absences.

=== Allegations of racial harassment ===
In 2005, security guard Loretta Avent filed a discrimination charge with the Equal Employment Opportunity Commission against McDonald, accusing him of retaliation after she coordinated a meeting that exposed Native American students' claims of harassment by students, in addition to unfair treatment by teachers. During that meeting, which took place in April, 36 parents, students and tribal leaders of the Gila River Indian Community met with school and district leaders to talk about allegations of racial discrimination and harassment, including claims of racial profiling, being called "savages", and inaction by teachers to rectify the problems.

After the aforementioned April meeting, Tempe Union High School District received a letter from four women, demanding an investigation into allegations of racial bias against the school's African American students, including unfair grading practices and a student assault, among other claims.

Closed door mediation sessions were later held between school district officials, school administrators, Gila River Indian Community Lt. Gov. Mary Thomas, and US Attorney Paul Charlton, which resulted in sensitivity training for faculty and the creation of a Native American Club on campus.

=== Allegations of sexual harassment by a staff member ===
Also in 2005, reports surfaced that the school's former football coach, Jim Rattay, was accused by female students of engaging in unprofessional conduct.

According to a report compiled by district officials, Rattay, in one incident, asked a 14-year-old female student to read in front of the class, passages from a pamphlet about teen pregnancy and sexually transmitted diseases. Rattay told the class that he had seen the girl's name in the boys' bathroom. The girl, who was not identified, claimed that Rattay also made false claims that she had white marks on her lips or chin after she read the passage from the pamphlet about herpes, which the students interpreted to mean that the girl in question either engaged in oral sex or had herpes. The girl also claimed that Rattay made another false comment about her being promiscuous as she sat down.

School district officials censured Rattay, but claimed that an investigation of him found "insufficient evidence" to support allegations of sexual harassment. The school district did not reveal details of disciplinary actions in the censure.

In a separate, unrelated complaint, Rattay was accused of calling another female student "ugly", and making other comments about her appearance.

=== Former teacher sues over alleged racially motivated incidents ===
In 2014, former teacher Cicely D. Cobb sued the school district and then principal Anna Battle, alleging a number of racially motivated incidents, some of which targeted African Americans at the school, had taken place. Cobb accused school administration of inaction, following a significant number of incidents.

=== Seniors spell out racial slur with shirts ===
In 2016, the school made headlines over an incident that took place after a panoramic picture session for the graduating seniors. The students wore shirts which together spelled out "BEST*YOU'VE*EVER*SEEN*CLASS*OF*2016", but a separate picture was taken of six female students, who arranged shirts so they spelled out the racial slur nigger, with the two "G"s in the middle replaced with the asterisks. The second picture of the students quickly spread over social media, generated significant backlash, and received national attention.

The incident sparked confrontations on campus. One of them involved a student trying to stop another student from being interviewed by a television reporter with Phoenix ABC affiliate KNXV-TV, and was captured on camera. Subsequent protests related to the controversy also saw counter-protesters who, according to at least one account, used the word "nigger" against the protesters, while calling on them to "stay on their side of the mountain".

The incident was thrust back into the media cycle by an article in the school's yearbook. Ultimately DVHS offered two yearbooks, one having the article and the other with the corresponding pages glued together.

=== Social media firearm threat ===
In 2018, The Phoenix Police Department announced that a social media threat had been made towards Desert Vista High School. The threat featured a picture of a rifle, which was later found to be copied and pasted from the website of a gun store. It was later determined that the threat had come from outside of the United States, and was not created by a Desert Vista student. The school continued to operate normally throughout the day, although some police officers were posted on campus. Desert Vista administrators respectfully asked parents to not visit the school to take their students out of class, as it could pose a further safety risk to students and faculty.

=== Mexican border senior prank ===
In 2019, the school once again found itself at the center of a racism controversy, after a tweet from a Twitter account titled "Desert Vista Senior Prank" implied that graduating seniors would pretend the front gate to the high school was the border to Mexico, with "cops searching cars, window washers, and people selling tortillas." School district officials denounced the tweet, and said the prank would not take place. In addition, a notice was sent to parents that called the tweets "insensitive and thoughtless and absolutely unacceptable."

=== Teacher arrested for online threats ===
In 2024, a newly hired teacher was arrested by Tempe police after posting multiple online threats against Donald Trump, Jr. and Charlie Kirk, founder of right-wing nonprofit Turning Point USA, who were in Tempe for a political rally. The teacher had sent multiple threatening messages to an automated mass-messaging system asking for an RSVP to the Turning Point rally at a Tempe hotel, and was subsequently placed on administrative leave by TUHSD. The teacher allegedly admitted to sending the threatening messages, and faced misdemeanor charges. The district released an official statement stating that it "does not tolerate or condone any form of threats or harassment made by employees or students."

== Alumni ==
- Bobby Wade, 1999: professional American football player
- James Casey, 2001: saxophonist
- Sarah Pauly, 2001: All-American and NPF professional softball player
- Max Crumm, 2003: actor and singer
- Zach Miller, 2004: American football player, Super Bowl XLVIII champion for the Seattle Seahawks
- Martin Gordon, 2006: baseball player who represented South Africa nationally
- Kimiko Glenn, 2007: Actress known for her role as Brook Soso on Orange is the New Black
- Jaycob Brugman, 2010: MLB outfielder for the Baltimore Orioles
- Jessica Nigri, 2007: cosplayer, promotional model, and voice actress
- Devon Kennard, 2009: NFL linebacker for the Arizona Cardinals and real estate entrepreneur
- J. J. Dielman, 2012: NFL guard for the Cincinnati Bengals
- Rio Gomez, 2014: professional baseball player in Taiwan
- Jalen Jelks, 2014: NFL defensive end for the Dallas Cowboys
- Kristine Anigwe, 2015: WNBA player for the Connecticut Sun
- Brandon Clarke, 2015: NBA forward for the Memphis Grizzlies
- Dani Jones, 2015: All-American and 4-time NCAA National Champion distance runner for the University of Colorado
- Samantha Keene Anderson, 2015: Miss United States titleholder
- Tate Schmitt, 2015: MLS soccer player
- Adonis Arms, 2016: basketball player for the Memphis Hustle
- Jamal Hinton, 2017: man who went viral while attending Desert Vista in 2016
- Mark Kastelic, 2017: professional ice hockey player
- Oso Ighodaro, 2020: basketball player for the Phoenix Suns
- Parker Navarro, 2020: college football quarterback for the UCF Knights and the Ohio Bobcats
- Grace Ping, 2021: Track and Field & Cross Country athlete who competes for the Oklahoma State Cowgirls
- Bradley Erickson, 2025: stock car racing driver
- Jerzy Robinson, attended 2023, transferred: top basketball recruit for the Class of 2026
