= A. G. Leonard =

State Geologist of North Dakota (1865–1932)

Arthur Gray Leonard
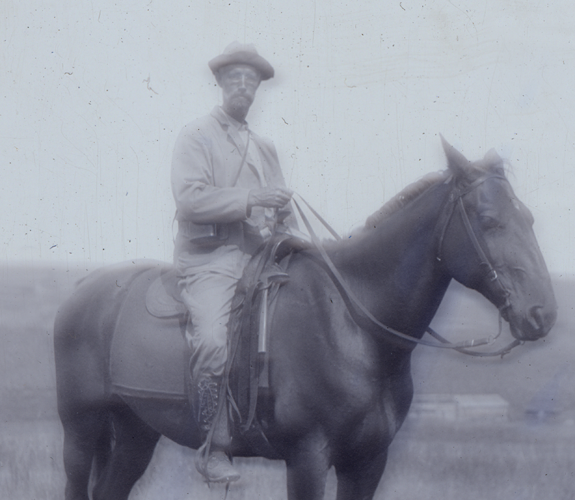
- Leonard c. 1910
- Born: March 15, 1865; Clinton, New York
- Died: December 17, 1932 (aged 67); Grand Forks, North Dakota
- Education: Johns Hopkins University
- Known for: Geology of lignite coal
- Scientific career
- Fields: Geology

Arthur Gray Leonard (March 15, 1865 – 17 December 1932) was an American researcher, geologist and educator.

The first State Geologist of North Dakota, he was also a professor of geology at the University of North Dakota and made contributions to the knowledge of lignite coal and its relation to geologic time.

== Biography ==
=== Early life and education ===
On March 15, 1865, A. G. Leonard was born in Clinton, New York. He graduated from Oberlin College in 1889 and in 1895 received an A.M. degree from the same. Three years later in 1898, he completed his Ph.D. from Johns Hopkins University.

Before going to North Dakota in 1903, he served as assistant state geologist of Iowa, assistant professor of geology at the University of Missouri and professor of geology at Western College.

=== Death ===
In the early morning of December 17, 1932, A. G. Leonard succumbed to the ill effects of a heart disease that had kept him at home since September.

== Awards and honors ==
The School of Geology and Geological Engineering in the College of Engineering and Mines at the University of North Dakota awards the A.G. Leonard Medal in his name. The mineraloid Leonardite and a building on the campus of University of North Dakota are named after him.
