= Black water (drink) =

Bottled alkaline water containing fulvic acid

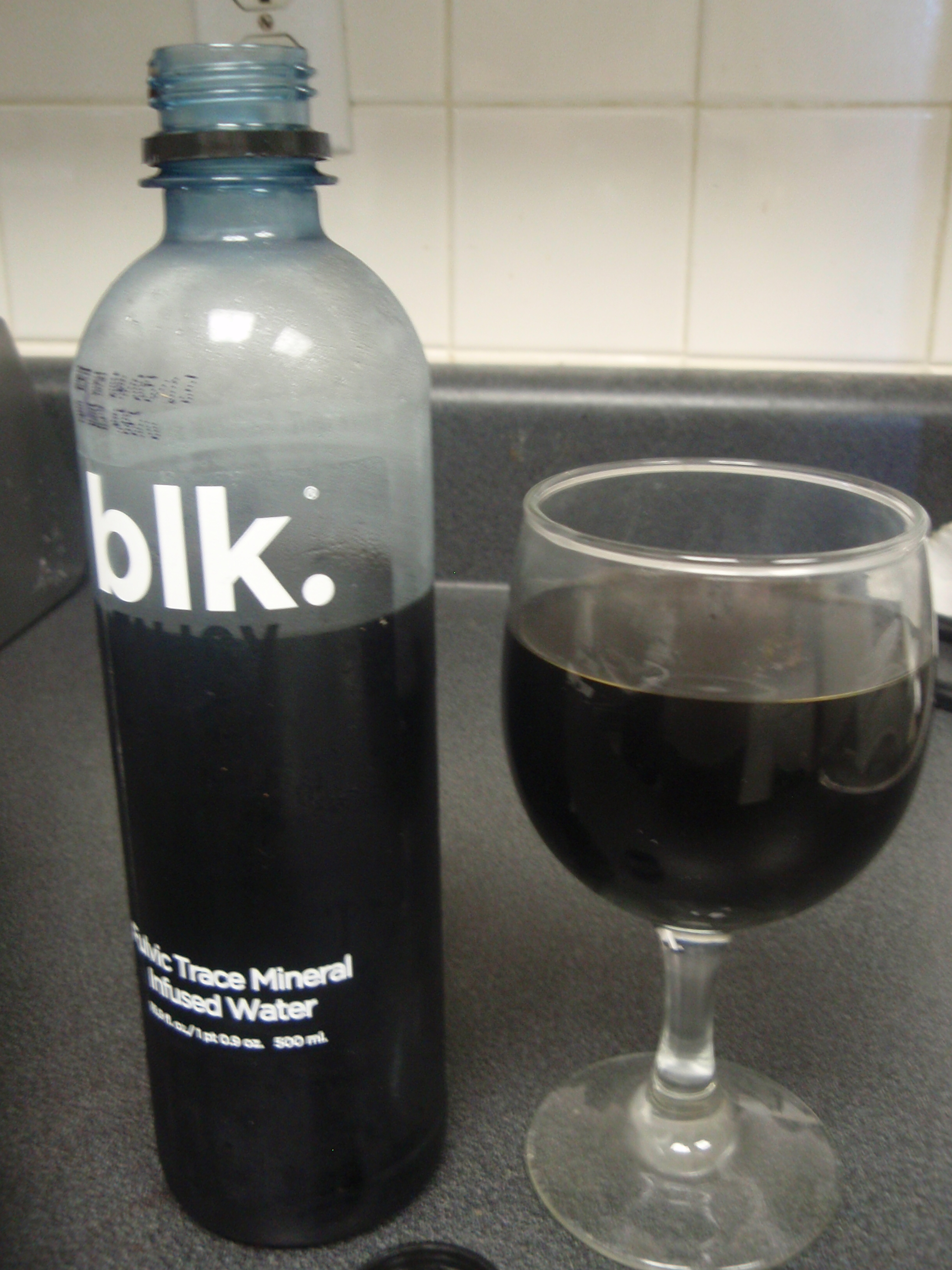
Bottle and glass of black water

Black water is a type of bottled alkaline water containing fulvic acid (FvA) and other mineral or vitamin additives. The water is named for its dark and opaque appearance, owing to the addition of the FvA. It has gained popularity as a health trend and status symbol.

== History ==
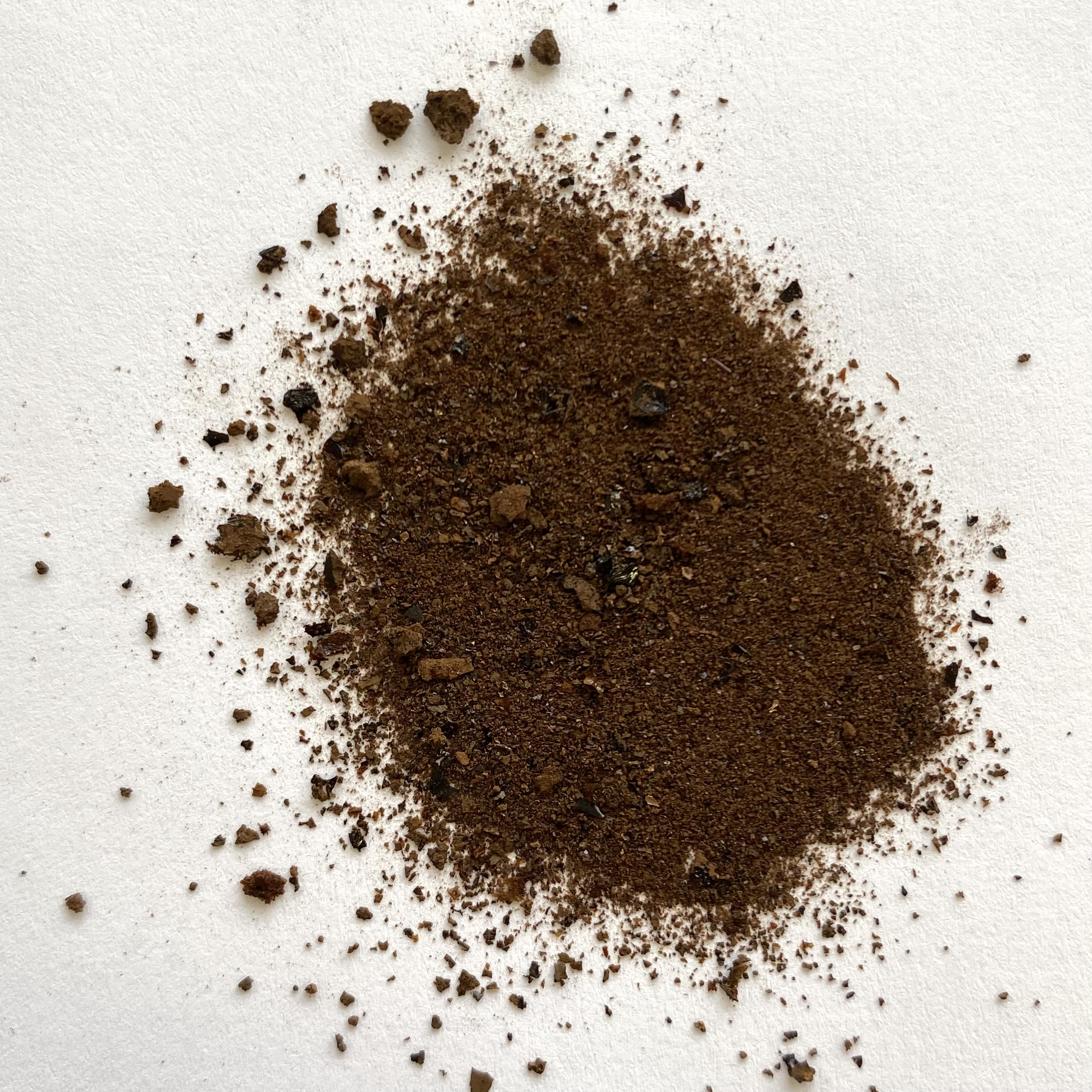
Pure fulvic acid powder

Fulvic acid has been used historically in ayurveda. It is the active component in shilajit, which is traditionally consumed by people from Nepal and northern India.

The concept of black water was first created by a Canadian family around 2008. The drink was concocted as a mix of fulvic acid with spring water to be taken as a health supplement. It was brought to the mainstream market in 2011 after the formation of the company Blk. The company grew through viral marketing by product placement on The Real Housewives, and later using influencers to sell the product on platforms such as TikTok.

In 2011, Blk was sued by Canadian firm Creative Thinkers over the trademark for "Blackwater". Creative Thinkers claimed they invented the process for creating black water in 2009.

== Characteristics ==
Black water companies market health benefits such as anti-aging, reducing blood sugar, and promoting gut health. However, the health benefits of consuming FvA through black water are not well studied. Fulvic acid is one of the principal components of natural humic substances formed during the microbial decomposition of plant and organic matter. Because its molecular composition varies substantially depending on its environmental source and extraction method, researchers have noted that comparing biological effects across different fulvic acid preparations is inherently difficult. While there are purported to be benefits to the immune system, intaking too much FvA may also be toxic. In low doses, it is thought to be safe to consume. Black water is reported to be tasteless, or only have a slight aftertaste.
