= Egelsee (Bern) =

Lake in the canton of Bern, Switzerland

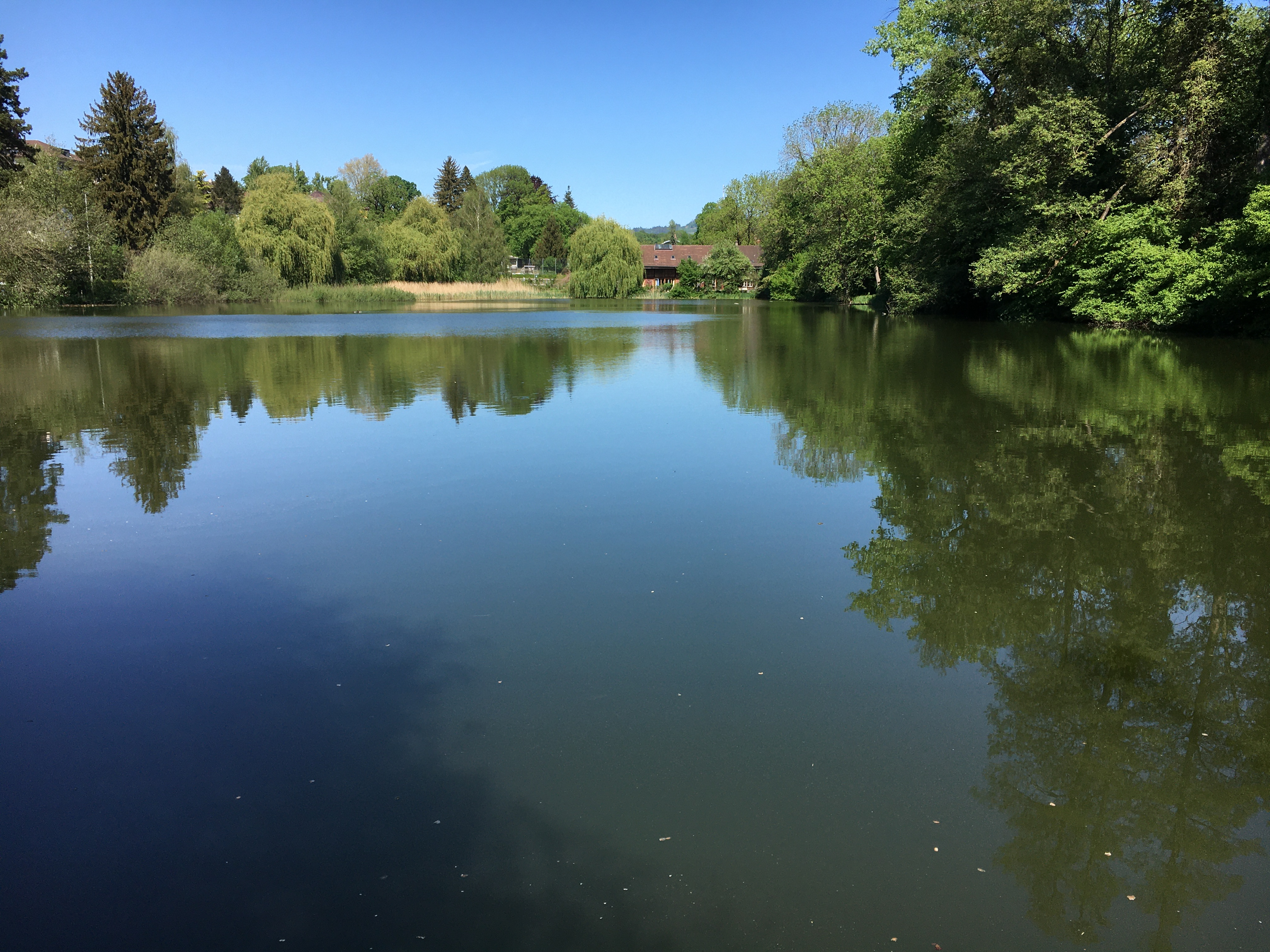

- Location within Canton of Bern Location within Switzerland Location within Alps
- Interactive map of Egelsee
- Location: City of Bern
- Coordinates: 46.94447°N 7.46487°E
- Catchment area: 0.48 km^{2} (0.19 sq mi)
- Basin countries: Switzerland
- Surface area: 1.52 ha (3.8 acres)
- Max. depth: 3.4 m (11 ft)
- Surface elevation: 550 m (1,800 ft)

Egelsee or Egelmösli is a lake in the City of Bern, Switzerland. Its surface area is 1.52 ha (3.8 acres). The lake is part of a park that stretches to the Paul Klee Zentrum. In some years, it freezes sufficiently to allow ice skating.
