= Humin =

Class of soil organic compounds insoluble in water at high pH

Humins are carbon-based macromolecular substances, that can be found in soil chemistry or as a by-product from saccharide-based biorefinery processes.

== Humins in soil chemistry ==
Soil consists of both mineral (inorganic) and organic components. The organic components can be subdivided into fractions that are soluble, largely humic acids, and insoluble, the humins. Humins make up about 50% of the organic matter in soil.

Due to their very complex molecular structure, humic substances, including humin, do not correspond to pure substances but consist of a mixture of many compounds that remain very difficult to characterize even using modern analytical techniques.

== Humins from biomass sources ==
Humins also produced during the dehydration of sugars, as occurs during the conversion of lignocellulosic biomass to smaller, higher value organic compounds such as 5-hydroxymethylfurfural (HMF). These humins can be in the form of either viscous liquids or solids depending on the process conditions used.

=== Humin structure and mechanism of formation ===
Both the structure of humins and the mechanism by which they are synthesized is at present not well defined as the formation and chemical properties of humins will change depending on the process conditions used. Generally, humins have a polymeric furanic-type structure, with hydroxyl, aldehyde and ketone functionalities. However, the structure is dependent on feedstock type (e.g. xylose or glucose) or concentration, reaction time, temperature, catalysts and many other parameters involved in the process. These parameters also influence the mechanism of formation which is still a matter of debate. Different pathways have been considered, including ring-opening hydrolysis of HMF (believed to be the key intermediate for the formation of humins), nucleophilic additions, or via the formation of an aromatic intermediate. While there is no clear evidence to substantiate or exclude the mechanisms, general consensus is on a series of condensation reactions that reduce the efficiency of biomass conversion strategies.

=== Safety aspects ===
Humins are not considered to be a dangerous substance according to officially recognized hazardous material classification systems based on physical-chemical properties such as flammability, explosiveness, susceptibility to oxidation, corrosiveness or eco-toxicity. Heating of humins forms a macroporous material known as humins foams and also these materials did not present critical fire behaviour despite their highly porous structure.

=== Potential applications of humins ===
In the past, humins from biomass sources have been mostly considered as combustible materials to supply heat for biorefinery processes. However, high value applications have started to receive more attention, notably the use of humins in the preparation of catalytic materials and in material applications (e.g. plastic reinforcement and construction materials). Humins can also be subjected to thermal treatments in order to form interesting solid materials, such as lightweight and porous humin foams. Overall, humins appear to improve the final properties of the materials although research is mainly at the proof-of-principle stage (early).

== See also ==
- Organic matter
- Soil organic matter
- Humus
- Humic substance
