= Egelsee (Aargau) =

Lake at Bergdietikon, Aargau, Switzerland

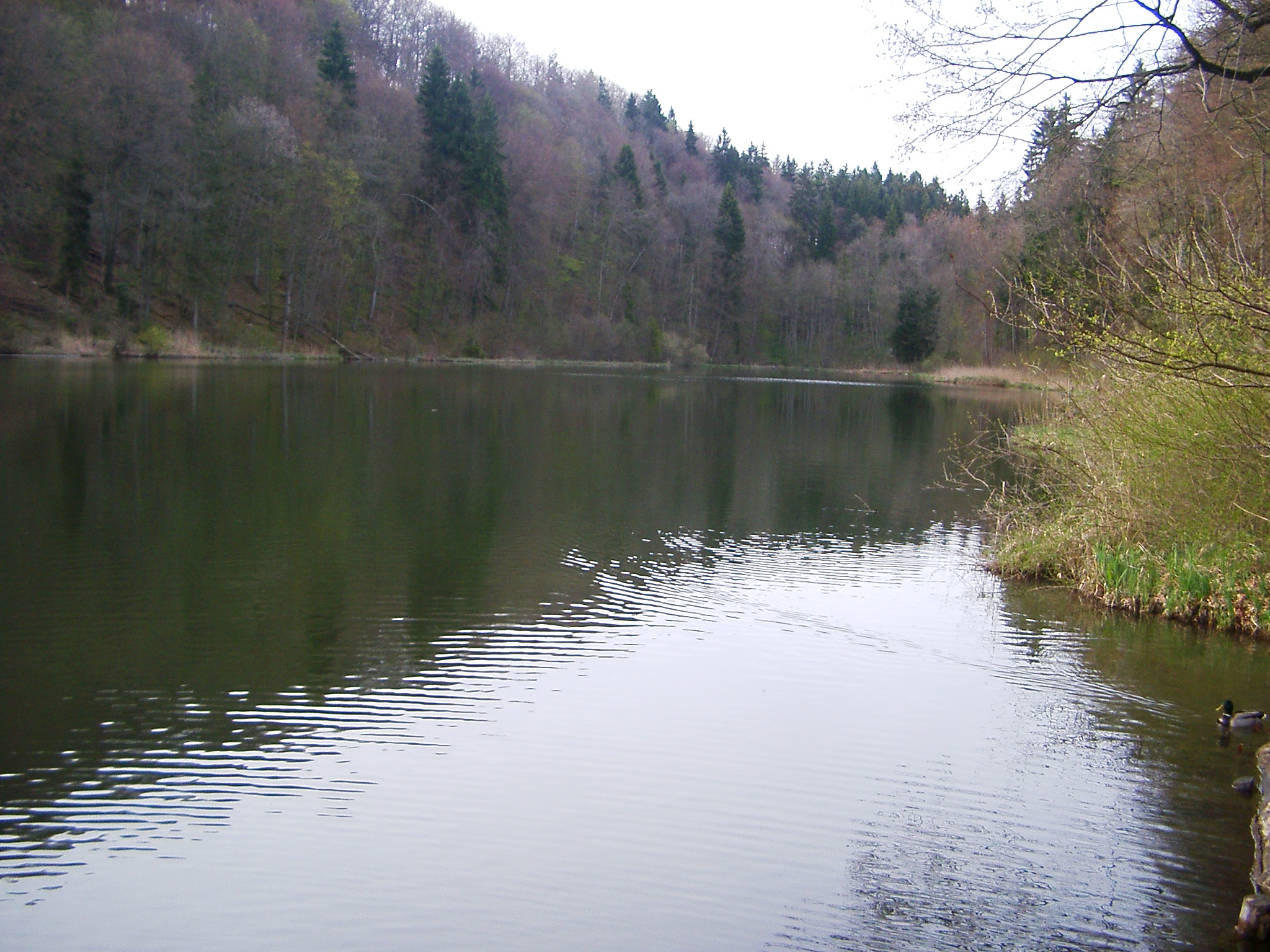

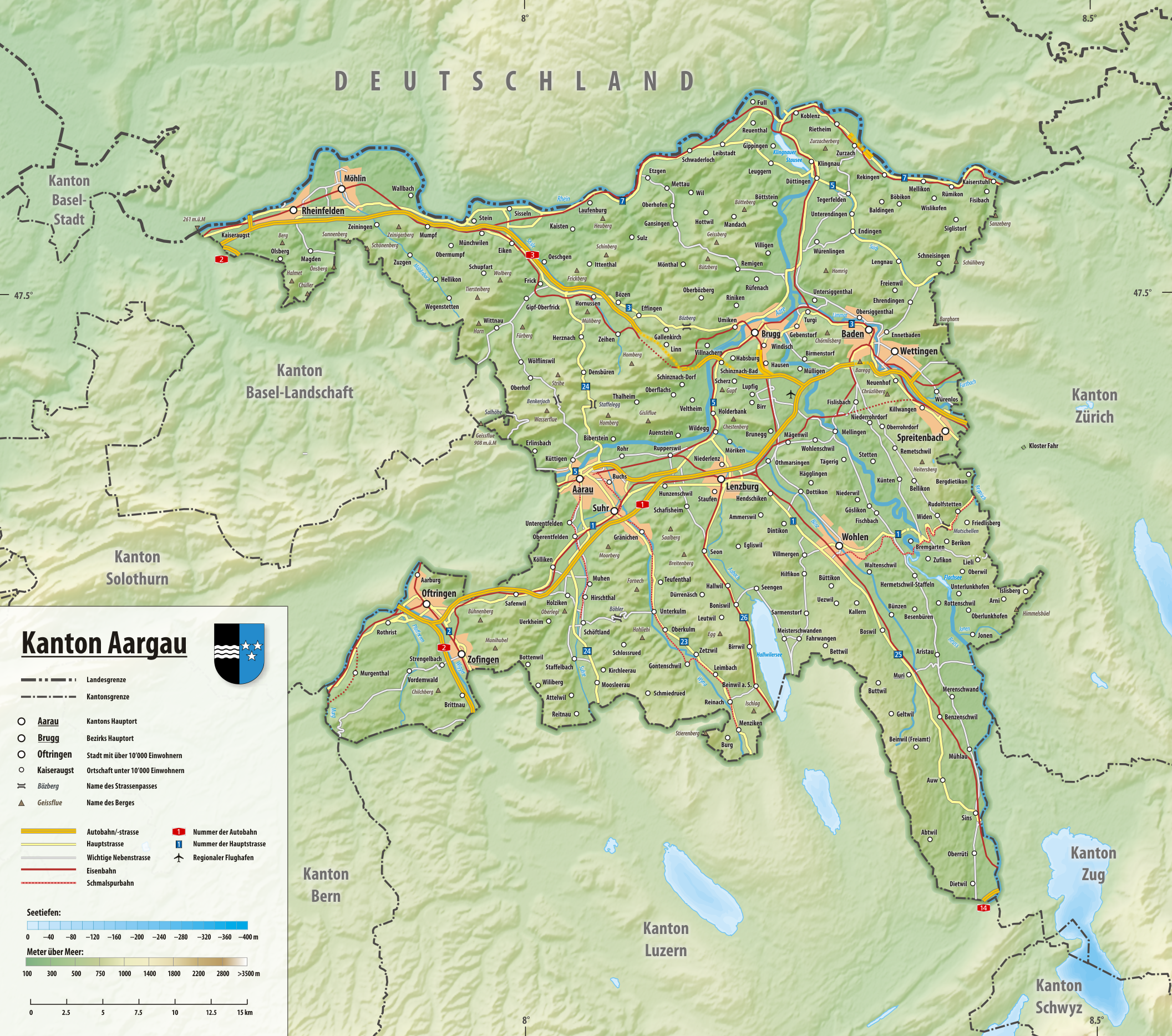
- Location within Canton of Aargau Location within Switzerland Location within Alps
- Interactive map of Egelsee
- Location: Aargau
- Coordinates: 47°24′2.05″N 8°21′34.73″E
- Basin countries: Switzerland
- Surface area: 2 ha (4.9 acres)
- Max. depth: 10.5 m (34 ft)
- Surface elevation: 667 m (2,188 ft)

Egelsee is a lake at Bergdietikon, Aargau, Switzerland. Its surface area is 2 ha (4.9 acres). It is the largest natural lake that lies entirely in the canton (the much larger Lake Hallwil lies partly in canton Lucerne).

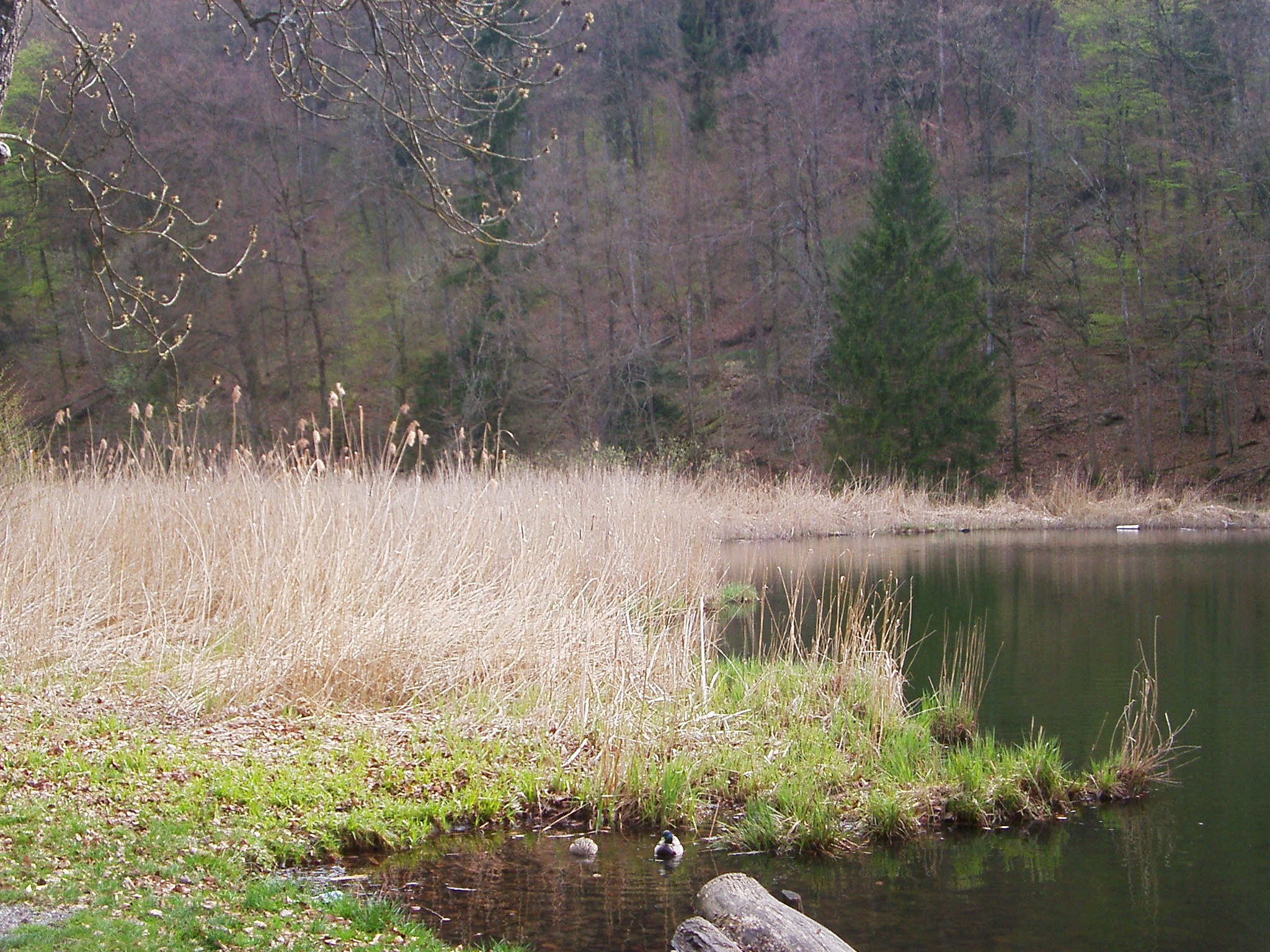
