= Egelsee (Unterach) =

Lake in Upper Austria, Austria

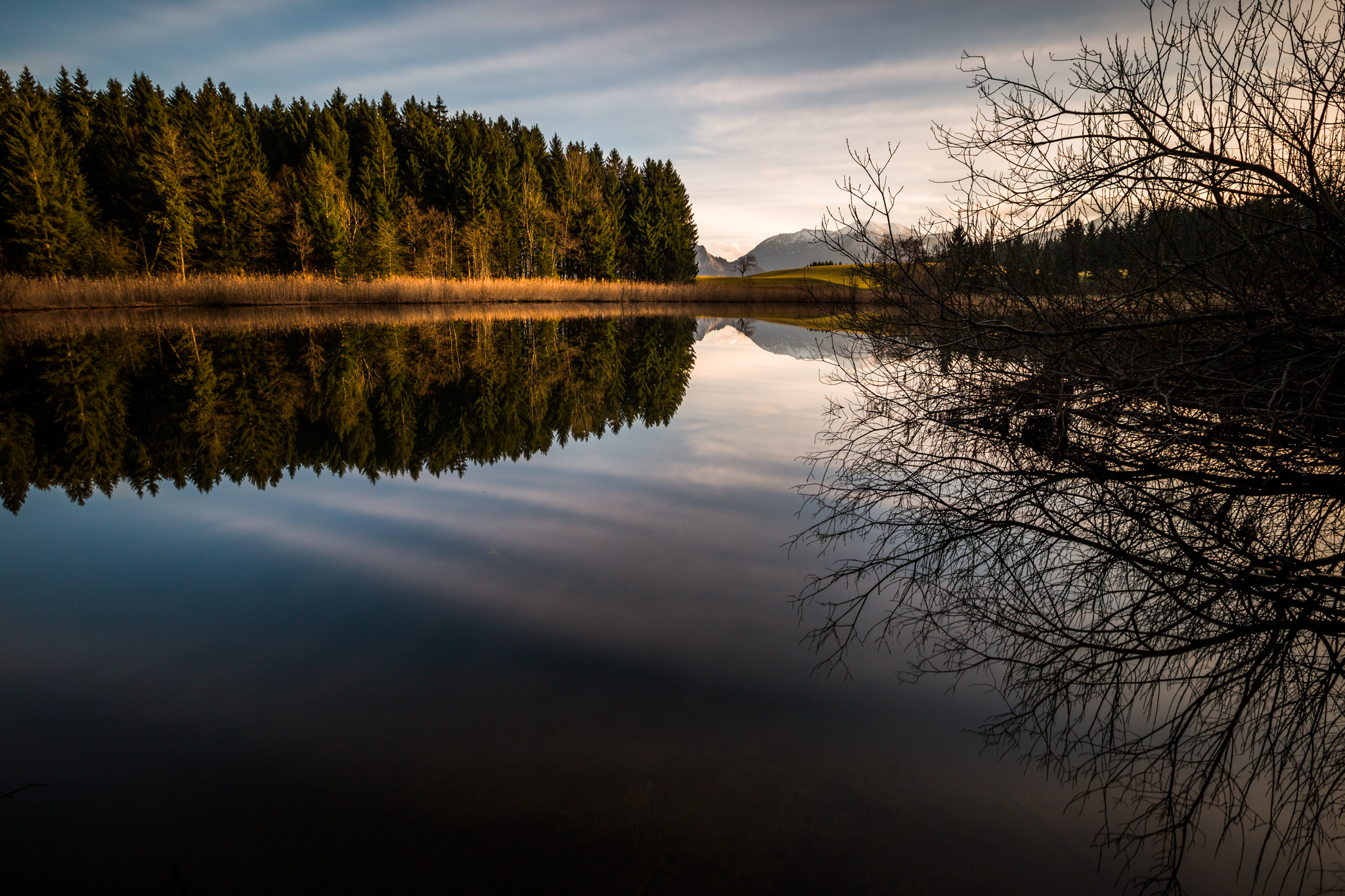
- Lake Egelsee

- Location within Austria
- Location: Upper Austria
- Coordinates: 47.8325°N 13.5043°E
- Type: lake

Egelsee is a lake of Upper Austria.
