= Leonardite =

Oxidation product of lignite rich in humic acids

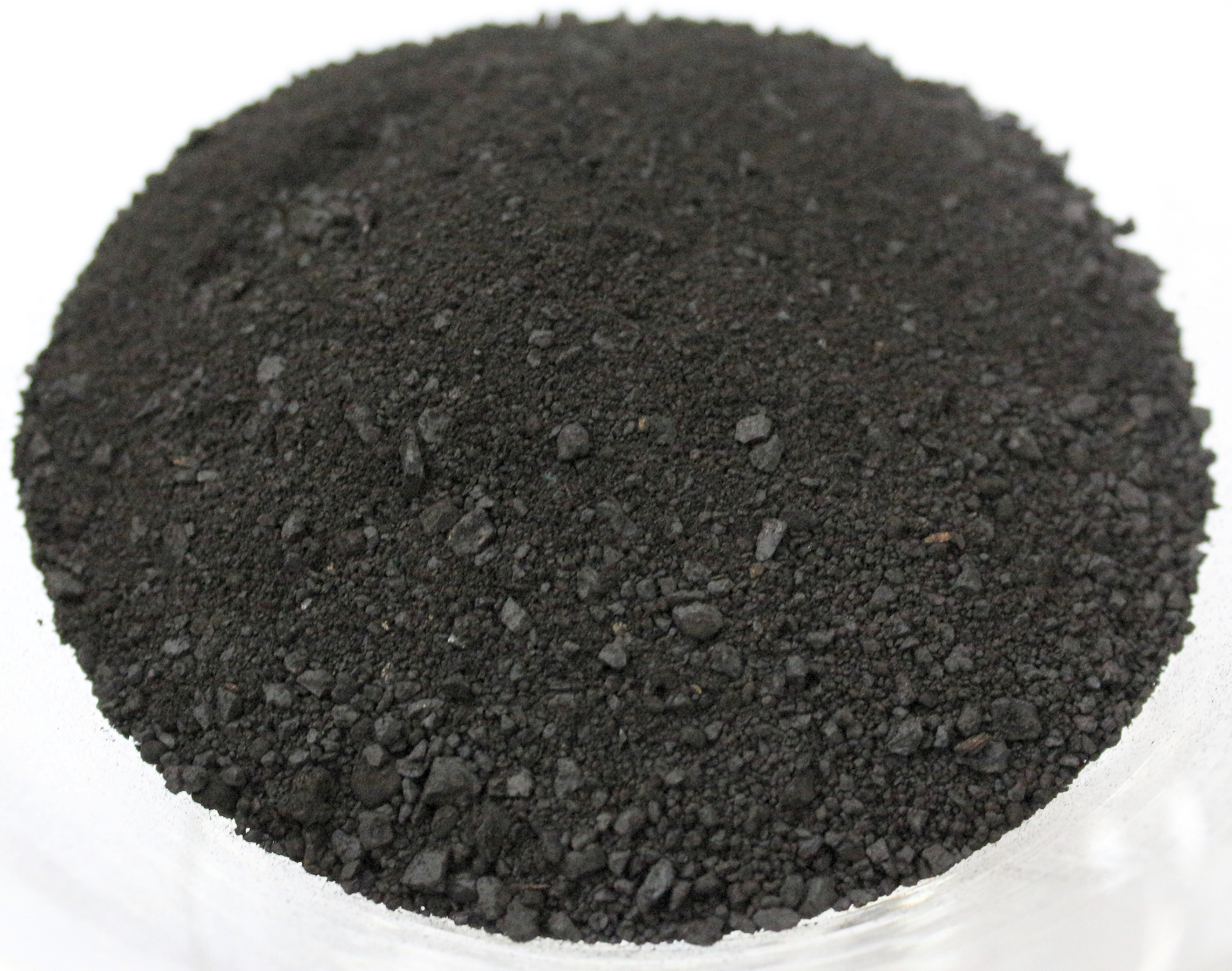
Leonardite, naturally oxidized lignite, rich in humic acid

Leonardite is a soft waxy, black or brown, shiny, vitreous mineraloid that is easily soluble in alkaline solutions. It is an oxidation product of lignite, associated with near-surface mining. It is a rich source of humic acid (up to 90%) and is used as a soil conditioner, as a stabilizer for ion-exchange resins in water treatment, in the remediation of polluted environments and as a drilling additive. It was named after A. G. Leonard, first director of the North Dakota Geological Survey, in recognition of his work on these deposits.

== Formation ==
Leonardite is found associated with near surface lignite deposits. They are thought to have been formed by the oxidation of the lignite, an interpretation supported by chemical analysis of leonardite compared to lignite.

== Occurrence ==
Leonardite was first described from North Dakota and is found associated with virtually all the lignite deposits in the state. Leonardite has also been described worldwide from deposits of lignite or sub-bituminous coals e.g. in Alberta, Canada, in Achlada and Zeli, Greece, in Turkey and in Bacchus Marsh, Australia.

== Uses ==
=== Soil conditioner ===
It is used to condition soils either by applying it directly to the land, or by providing a source of humic acid or potassium humate for application. The carbon geosequestration potential of Leonardite, particularly to rapidly accelerate microbial action to lock up and retain carbon in soils, provides the basis for extensive research in Victoria on the organic fertilising aspect of brown coal.

=== Remediation of polluted soils ===
Leonardite can be added directly to soils to reduce the uptake of metals by plants in contaminated ground, particularly when combined with compost.

=== Drilling additive ===
Leonardite is used to stabilise and thin the drilling fluid used to make in oil, gas, and geothermal wells. It was first employed extensively during World War II when quebracho tannin became difficult to obtain. It has very good temperature stability and prevents solidification of lime muds near 150 °C.
