= Humic substance =

Major component of natural organic matter

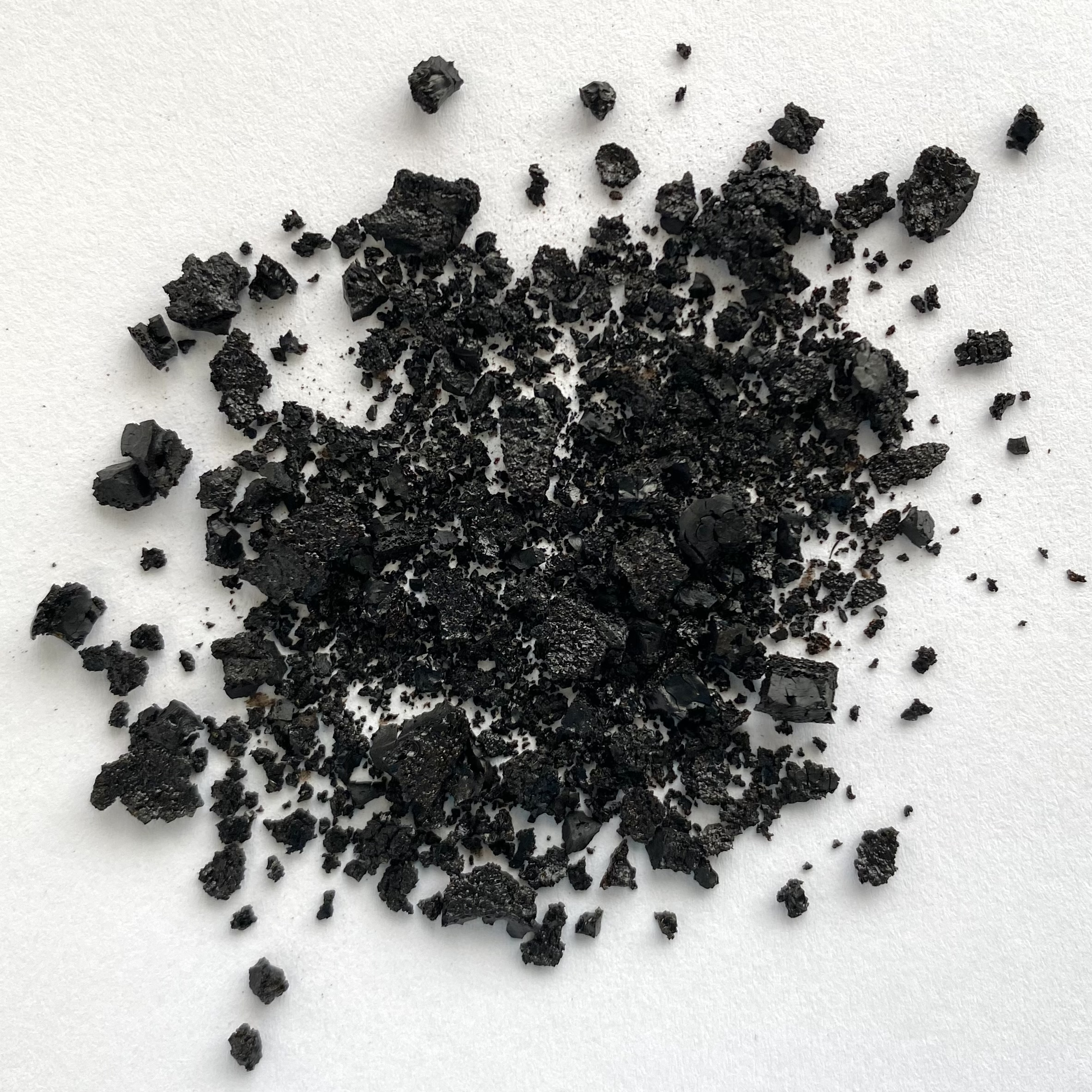
Humic acid isolated from peat

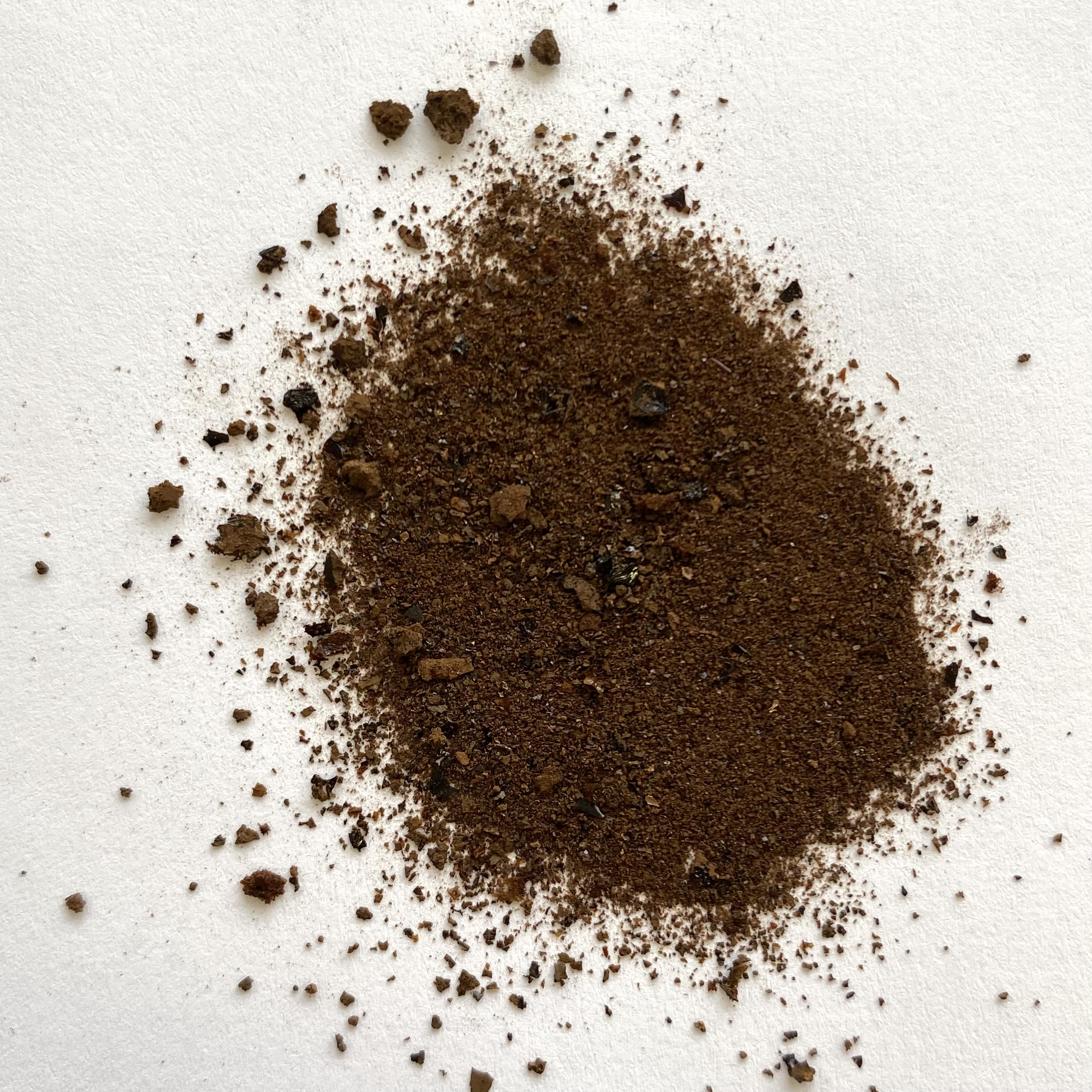
Fulvic acid isolated from peat

Humic substances (HS) are relatively recalcitrant colored organic compounds naturally formed during long-term decomposition and transformation of biomass residues. The color of humic substances varies from bright yellow to light or dark brown leading to black. The term comes from humus, which in turn comes from the Latin word humus, meaning "soil, earth". Humic substances constitute the majority of organic matter in soil, peat, coal, and sediments, and are important components of dissolved natural organic matter (NOM) in lakes (especially dystrophic lakes), rivers, and sea water. Humic substances account for 50 – 90% of cation exchange capacity in soils.

"Humic substances" is an umbrella term covering humic acid, fulvic acid, and humin, which differ in solubility. By definition, humic acid (HA) is soluble in water at neutral and alkaline pH, but insoluble at acidic pH < 2. Fulvic acid (FA) is soluble in water at any pH. Humin is not soluble in water at any pH.

This definition of humic substances is largely operational. It is rooted in the history of soil science and, more precisely, in the tradition of alkaline extraction, which dates back to 1786, when Franz Karl Achard treated peat with a solution of potassium hydroxide and, after subsequent addition of an acid, obtained an amorphous dark precipitate (i.e., humic acid). Aquatic humic substances were isolated for the first time in 1806, from spring water by Jöns Jakob Berzelius.

In terms of chemistry, FA, HA, and humin share more similarities than differences and represent a continuum of humic molecules. All of them are constructed from similar aromatic, polyaromatic, aliphatic, and carbohydrate units and contain the same functional groups (mainly carboxylic, phenolic, and ester groups), albeit in varying proportions.

Water solubility of humic substances is primarily governed by the interplay of two factors: the amount of ionizable functional groups (mainly carboxylic) and molecular weight (MW). In general, fulvic acid has a higher amount of carboxylic groups and lower average molecular weight than does humic acid. Measured average molecular weights vary with source; however, molecular weight distributions of HA and FA overlap significantly.

Age and origin of the source material determine the chemical structure of humic substances. In general, humic substances derived from soil and peat (which takes hundreds to thousands of years to form) have higher molecular weight, higher amounts of O and N, more carbohydrate units, and fewer polyaromatic units than humic substances derived from coal and leonardite (which takes millions of years to form).

HS can be isolated by the adsorption onto a resin of an alkaline extraction from solid sources of NOM. A newer view of humic substances is that they are not mostly high-molecular-weight macropolymers. Rather, they represent a heterogeneous mixture of relatively small molecular components of the soil organic matter auto-assembled in supramolecular associations and are composed of a variety of compounds of biological origin and synthesized by abiotic and biotic reactions in soil and surface waters. It is the large molecular complexity of the soil humeome that confers to humic matter its bioactivity in, its stability in ecosystems, soil and its role as plant growth promoter (in particular plant roots).

The academic definition of humic substances is under debate. Some researchers argue against the traditional concept of humification, proposing that alkali extraction does not provide a fair view of HS due to the use of highly alkaline extracts instead of water.

== Concepts of humic substances ==
The formation of HS in nature is one of the least understood aspects of humus chemistry and one of the most intriguing. Historically, there have been three main theories to explain it: the lignin theory of Waksman (1932), the polyphenol theory, and the sugar-amine condensation theory of Maillard (1911). Humic substances are formed by the microbial degradation of dead biotic matter, such as lignin, cellulose, ligno-cellulose and charcoal. Humic substances in the lab are resistant to further biodegradation. Their structure, elemental composition and content of functional groups of a given sample depend on the water or soil source and the specific procedures and conditions of extraction. Nevertheless, the average properties of lab extractes HS from different sources are remarkably similar.

=== Fractionation ===
Historically, scientists have used variations of similar methods for extracting HS from NOM and separating the extracts into HA and FA. The International Humic Substances Society advocates using standard laboratory methods to prepare humic and fulvic acids. Humic substances are extracted from soil and other solid sources using 0.1 M NaOH, under a nitrogen atmosphere, to prevent abiotic oxidation of some of the components of HS. The HA is then precipitated at pH 1. The soluble fraction is treated on a resin column to separate fulvic acid components from other acid soluble compounds. The fraction of NOM not extracted by 0.1 NaOH is humin. Humic and fulvic acid are extracted from natural waters using a resin column after microfiltration and acidification to pH 2. The humic materials are eluted from the column with NaOH, and humic acid is precipitated at pH 1. After adjusting the pH to 2, fulvic acid is separated from other acid soluble compounds, using a resin column as with solid phase sources. An analytical method for quantifying humic acid and fulvic acid in commercial ores and humic products, has been developed based on the IHSS humic acid and fulvic acid preparation methods.

Scientists associated with the IHSS have also isolated the entire NOM from blackwater rivers using reverse osmosis. The retentate from this process contains both humic and fulvic acids, predominately humic acid. The NOM from hard water streams has been isolated using reverse osmosis and electrodialysis in tandem.

Extracted humic acid is not a single acid; instead, it is a complex mixture of many different acids containing carboxyl and phenolate groups so that the mixture behaves functionally as a dibasic acid or, occasionally, as a tribasic acid. Commercial humic acid used to amend soil is manufactured using these well-established procedures. Humic acids can form complexes with ions that are commonly found in the environment creating humic colloids.

A sequential chemical fractionation can isolate more homogeneous humic fractions and determine their molecular structures by advanced spectroscopic and chromatographic methods. Substances identified in humic extracts and directly in soil include mono-, di-, and tri-hydroxycarboxylic acids, fatty acids, dicarboxylic acids, linear alcohols, phenolic acids, terpenoids, carbohydrates, and amino acids. This suggests humic molecules may form a supramolecular structures held together by non-covalent forces, such as van der Waals force, π-π, and CH-π bonds.

== Chemical characteristics ==
Since the dawn of modern chemistry, humic substances are among the most studied among natural materials. Despite long study, their molecular structure remains debatable. The traditional view has been that humic substances are hetero- poly-condensates, in varying associations with clay. A more recent view is that relatively small molecules also play a major role.

A typical humic substance is a mixture of many molecules, some of which are based on a motif of aromatic nuclei with phenolic and carboxylic substituents, linked together; The functional groups that contribute most to surface charge and reactivity of humic substances are phenolic and carboxylic groups. Humic substances commonly behave as mixtures of dibasic acids, with a pK_{1} value around 4 for protonation of carboxyl groups and around 8 for protonation of phenolate groups in HA. Fulvic acids are more acidic than HA. There is considerable overall similarity among individual humic acids. For this reason, measured pK values for a given sample are average values relating to the constituent species. The other important characteristic is charge density.

Stevenson model structure of a humic acid, with a variety of components including quinone, phenol, catechol, and sugar moieties

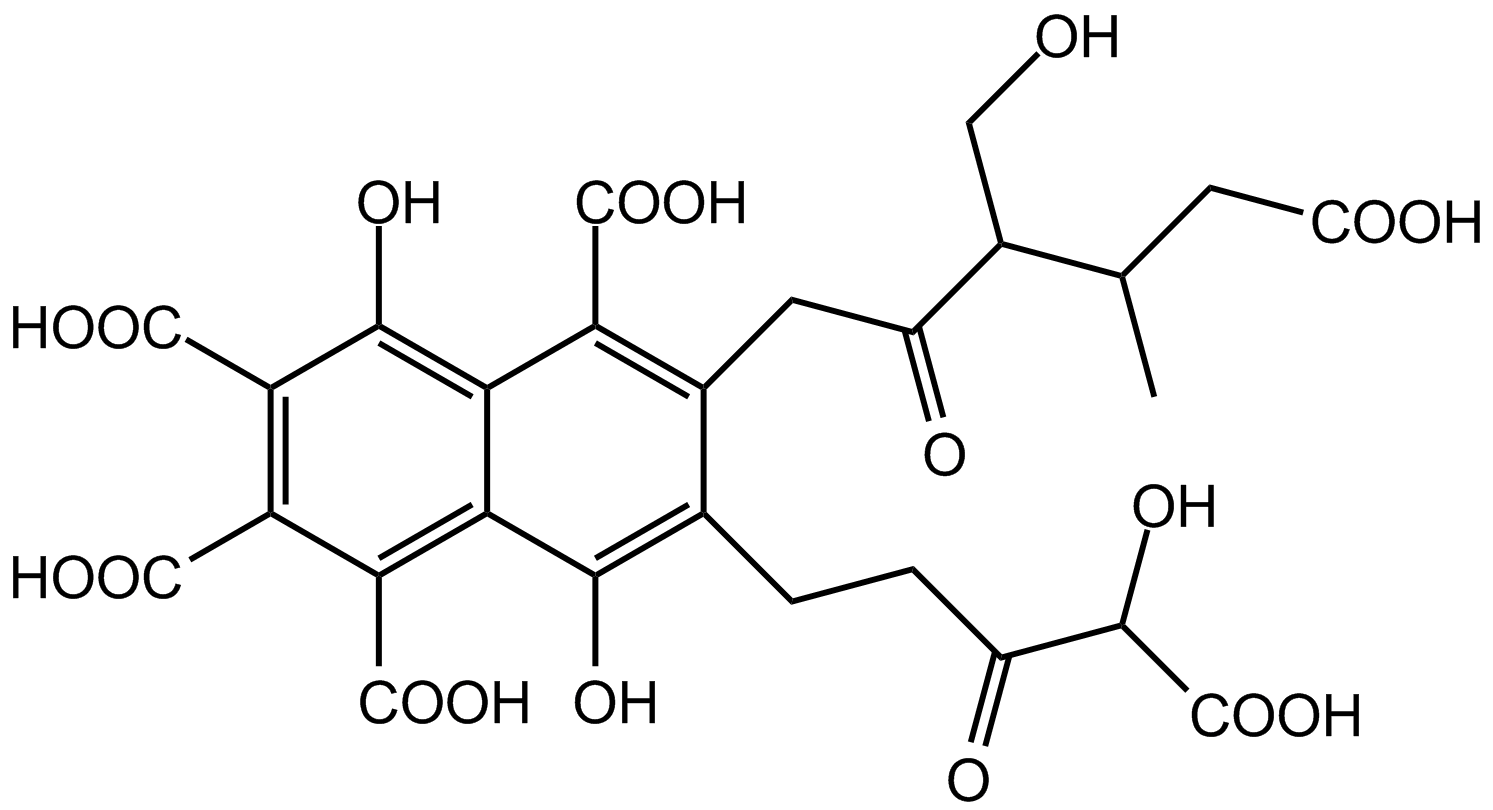
Model structure of a fulvic acid

The more recent determinations of molecular weights of HS show that the molecular weights are not as great as once thought. Reported number average molecular weights of soil HA are < 6000 but they are highly poly disperse with some components with much larger measure molecular weights and much lower. Measured number average molecular weights of aquatic HS with HA ≤ 1700 and FA < 900. The aquatic HA and FA are also highly poly disperse. The number of individually distinct components in HS, as measured by mass spectroscopy is in the thousands. The average composition of HA and FA can be represented by model structures.

The presence of carboxylate and phenolate groups gives the humic acids the ability to form complexes with ions such as Mg^{2+}, Ca^{2+}, Fe^{2+}, and Fe^{3+} creating humic colloids. Many humic acids have two or more of these groups arranged so as to enable the formation of chelate complexes. The formation of (chelate) complexes is an important aspect of the biological role of humic acids in regulating bioavailability of metal ions.

== Criticism ==
Decomposition products of dead plant materials form intimate associations with minerals, making it difficult to isolate and characterize soil organic constituents. 18th century soil chemists successfully used alkaline extraction to isolate a portion of the organic constituents in soil. This led to the theory that a 'humification' process created distinct 'humic substances' like 'humic acid', 'fulvic acid', and 'humin'. However, modern chemical analysis methods applied to unprocessed mineral soil have not directly observed large humic molecules. This suggests that the extraction and fractionation techniques used to isolate humic substances alter the original chemical composition of the organic matter. Since the definition of humic substances like humic and fulvic acids relies on their separation through these methods, it raises the question of whether the distinction between these compounds accurately reflects the natural state of organic matter in soil. Despite these concerns, the 'humification' theory persists in the field and even in textbooks, and attempts to redefine 'humic substances' in soil have resulted in a proliferation of conflicting definitions. This lack of consensus makes it difficult to communicate scientific understanding of soil processes and properties accurately.

== Determination of humic acids in water samples ==
The presence of humic acid in water intended for potable or industrial use can have a significant impact on the treatability of that water and the success of chemical disinfection processes. For instance, humic and fulvic acids can react with the chemicals used in the chlorination process to form disinfection byproducts such as dihaloacetonitriles, which are toxic to humans. Accurate methods of establishing humic acid concentrations are therefore essential in maintaining water supplies, especially from upland peaty catchments in temperate climates.

As a lot of different bio-organic molecules in very diverse physical associations are mixed together in natural environments, it is cumbersome to measure their exact concentrations in the humic superstructure. For this reason, concentrations of humic acid are traditionally estimated out of concentrations of organic matter, typically from concentrations of total organic carbon (TOC) or dissolved organic carbon (DOC).

Extraction procedures are bound to alter some of the chemical linkages present in the soil humic substances (mainly ester bonds in biopolyesters such as cutins and suberins). The humic extracts are composed of large numbers of different bio-organic molecules that have not yet been totally separated and identified. However, single classes of residual biomolecules have been identified by selective extractions and chemical fractionation, and are represented by alkanoic and hydroxy alkanoic acids, resins, waxes, lignin residues, sugars, and peptides.

== Ecological effects ==
Organic matter soil amendments have been known by farmers to be beneficial to plant growth for longer than recorded history. However, the chemistry and function of the organic matter have been a subject of controversy since humans began postulating about it in the 18th century. Until the time of Liebig, it was supposed that humus was used directly by plants, but, after Liebig showed that plant growth depends upon inorganic compounds, many soil scientists held the view that organic matter was useful for fertility only as it was broken down with the release of its constituent nutrient elements into inorganic forms. At the present time, soil scientists hold a more holistic view and at least recognize that humus influences soil fertility through its effect on the water-holding capacity of the soil. Also, since plants have been shown to absorb and translocate the complex organic molecules of systemic insecticides, they can no longer discredit the idea that plants may be able to absorb the soluble forms of humus; this may in fact be an essential process for the uptake of otherwise insoluble iron oxides.

A study on the effects of humic acid on plant growth was conducted at Ohio State University which said in part "humic acids increased plant growth" and that there were "relatively large responses at low application rates".

A 1998 study by scientists at the North Carolina State University College of Agriculture and Life Sciences showed that addition of humate to soil significantly increased root mass in creeping bentgrass turf.

A 2018 study by scientists at the University of Alberta showed that humic acids can reduce prion infectivity in laboratory experiments, but that this effect may be uncertain in the environment due to minerals in the soil that buffer the effect.

== Anthropogenic production ==
Humans can affect the production of humic substances via a variety of ways: by making use of natural processes by composting lignin or adding biochar (see soil rehabilitation), or by industrial synthesis of artificial humic substances from organic feedstocks directly. These artificial substances may be similarly divided into artificial humic acid (A-HA) and artificial fulvic acid (A-FA).

A more recent process known as hydrothermal humification and fulvification , allows the conversion of a wide range of biomass and biogenic residues into artificial humin, A-HA, and A-FA under controlled temperature (180 °C–250 °C) and autogenic pressure, similar to hydrothermal carbonization but in an alkaline solution, which results in the autoneutralization of the reaction medium through the conversion of biomass components—cellulose, hemicellulose, and lignin—within minutes to hours, compared to the natural process which takes years in nature. This method enables rapid and tunable production of artificial humic substances while retaining critical functional groups important for soil health, carbon sequestration, and plant growth stimulation. Artificial humic acids have also been shown to mitigate the negative effects of drought on soil microbial communities, supporting microbial diversity and functionality under stress conditions. The synthesized humic substances, produced within a few hours, were successfully applied to save a 160-year-old beech tree in Park Sanssouci, Potsdam, Germany, which was under stress due to water scarcity and the sandy soil conditions typical of Brandenburg.

Lignosulfonates, a by-product from the sulfite pulping of wood, are valorized in the industrial fabrication of concrete where they serve as water reducer, or concrete superplasticizer, to decrease the water-cement ratio (w/c) of fresh concrete while preserving its workability. The w/c ratio of concrete is one of the main parameter controlling the mechanical strength of hardened concrete and its durability. The same wood pulping process can also be applied to obtain humus-like substances by hydrolysis and oxidation. A kind of artificial "lignohumate" can be directly produced from wood in this way.

Agricultural litter can be turned into an artificial humic substance by a hydrothermal reaction. The resulting mixture can increase the content of dissolved organic matter (DOM) and total organic carbon (TOC) in soil.

Lignite (brown coal) may also be oxidized to produce humic substances, reversing the natural process of coal formation under anoxic and reducing conditions. This form of "mineral-derived fulvic acid" is widely used in China. This process also occurs in nature, producing leonardite.

=== Economic geology ===
In economic geology, the term humate refers to geological materials, such as weathered coal beds (leonardite), mudrock, or pore material in sandstones, that are rich in humic acids. Humate has been mined from the Fruitland Formation of New Mexico for use as a soil amendment since the 1970s, with nearly 60,000 metric tons produced by 2016. Humate deposits may also play an important role in the genesis of uranium ore bodies.

== Technological applications ==
The heavy-metal binding abilities of humic acids have been exploited to develop remediation technologies for removing lead from wastewater. To this end, Yurishcheva et al. coated magnetic nanoparticles with humic acids. After capturing lead ions, the nanoparticles can then be captured using a magnet.

=== Ancient masonry ===
Archeology finds that ancient Egypt used mudbricks reinforced with straw and humic acids.

== See also ==
- Black water (drink)
- Humin
- Humus
- Polycyclic aromatic hydrocarbon
- Soil
