= Garden District, Toronto =

Coordinates: 43.6585°N 79.3758°W

Garden District
- Neighbourhood
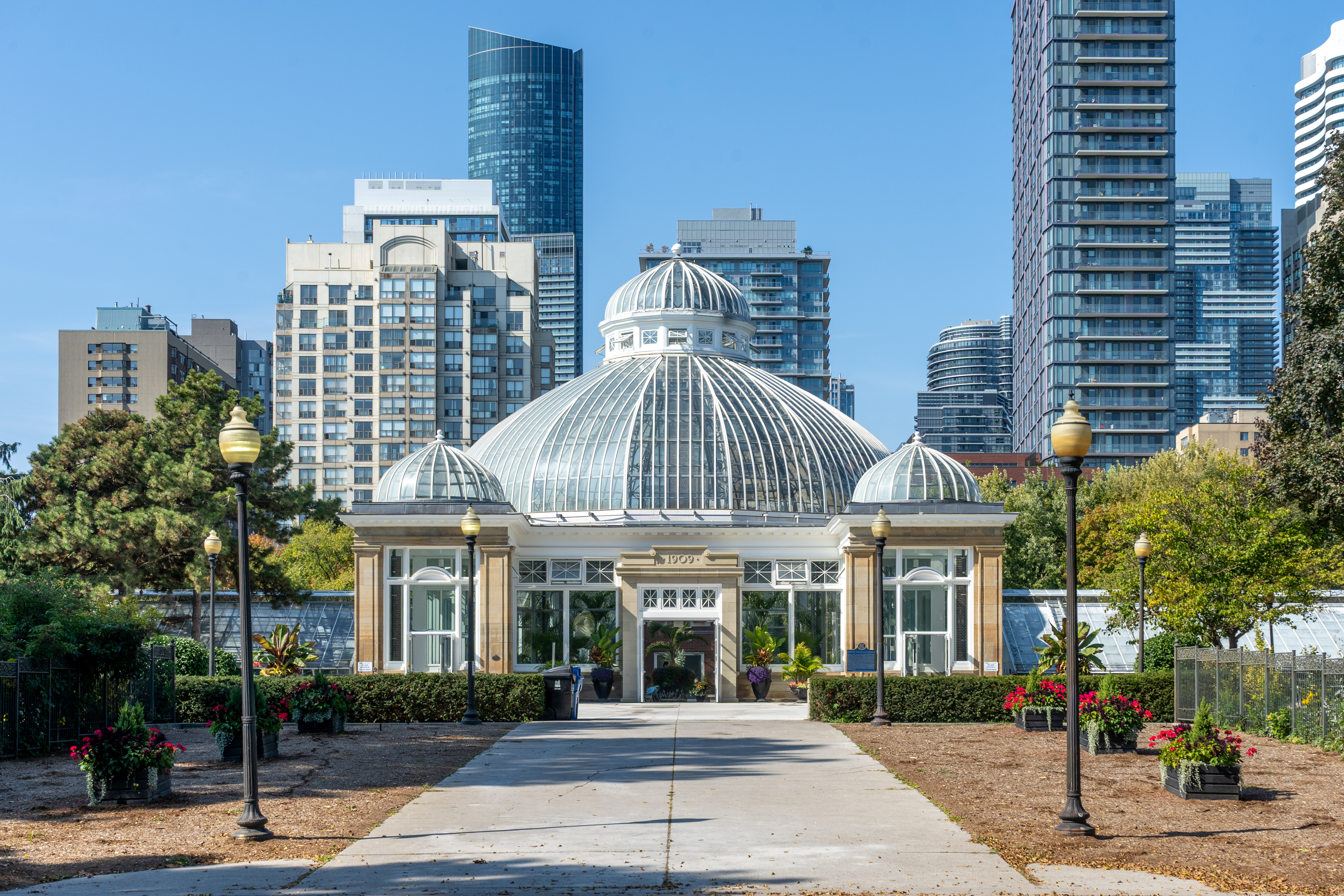
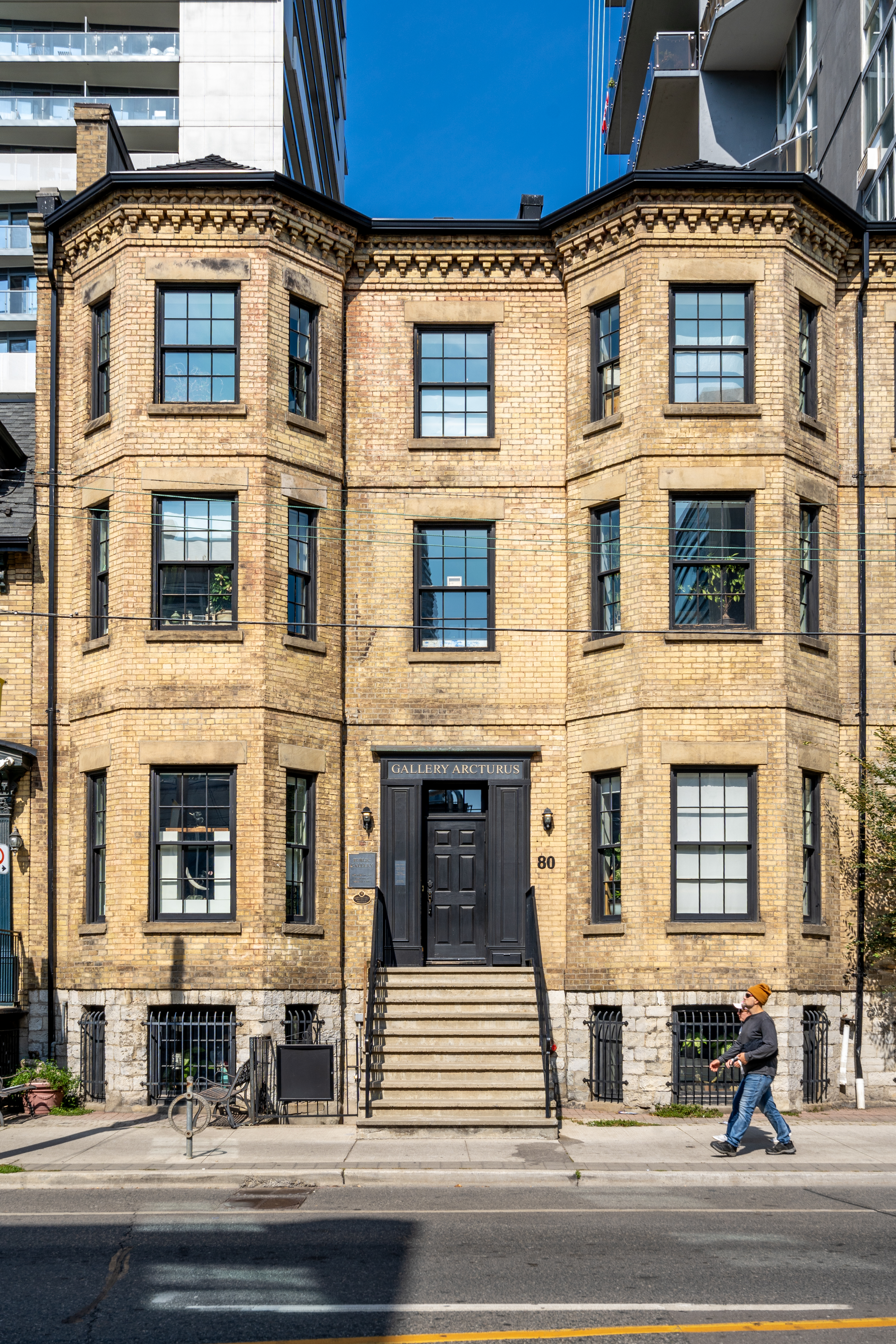
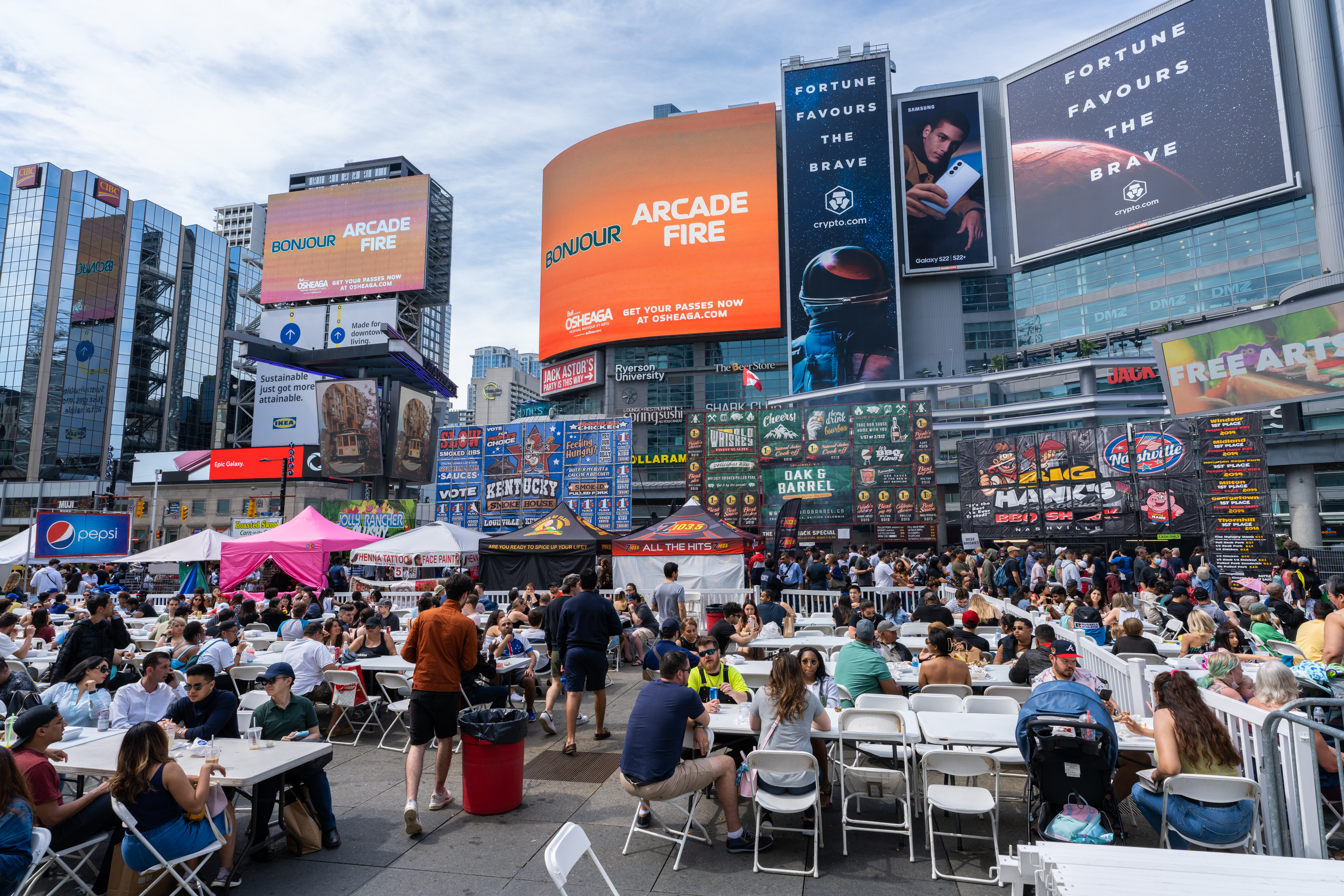
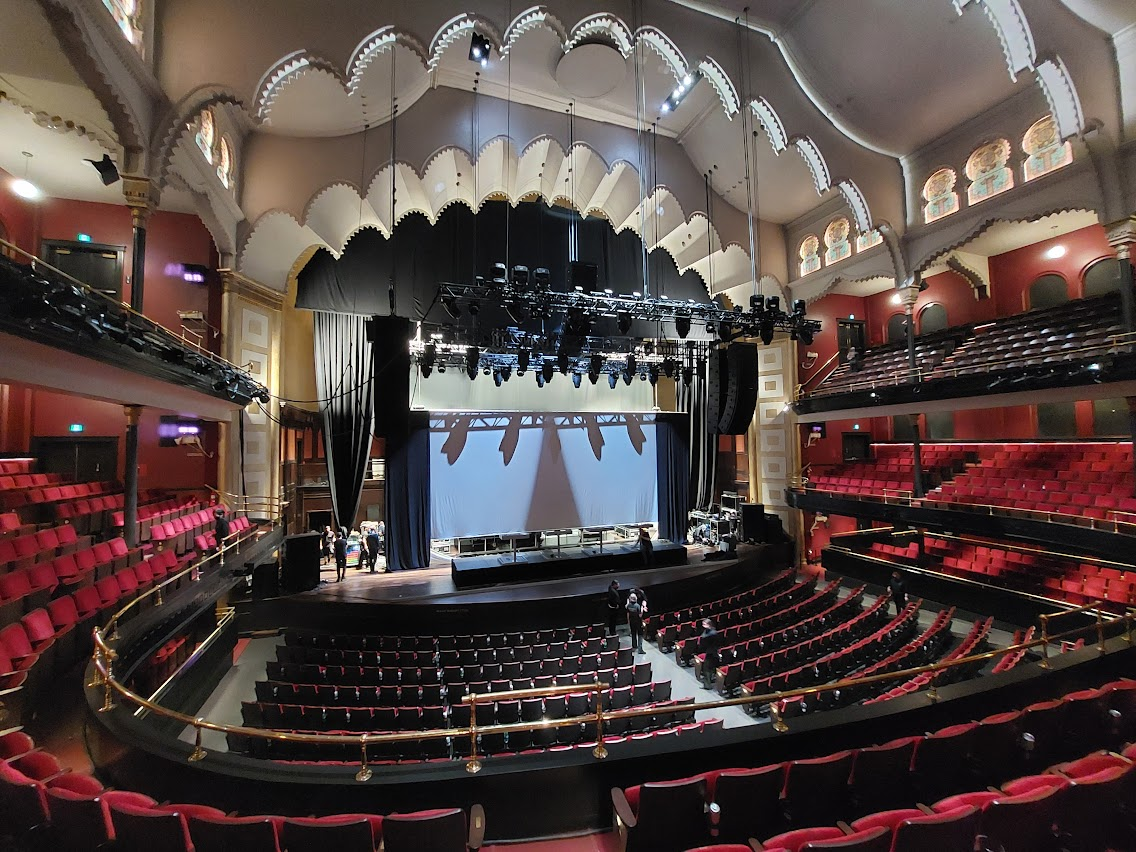
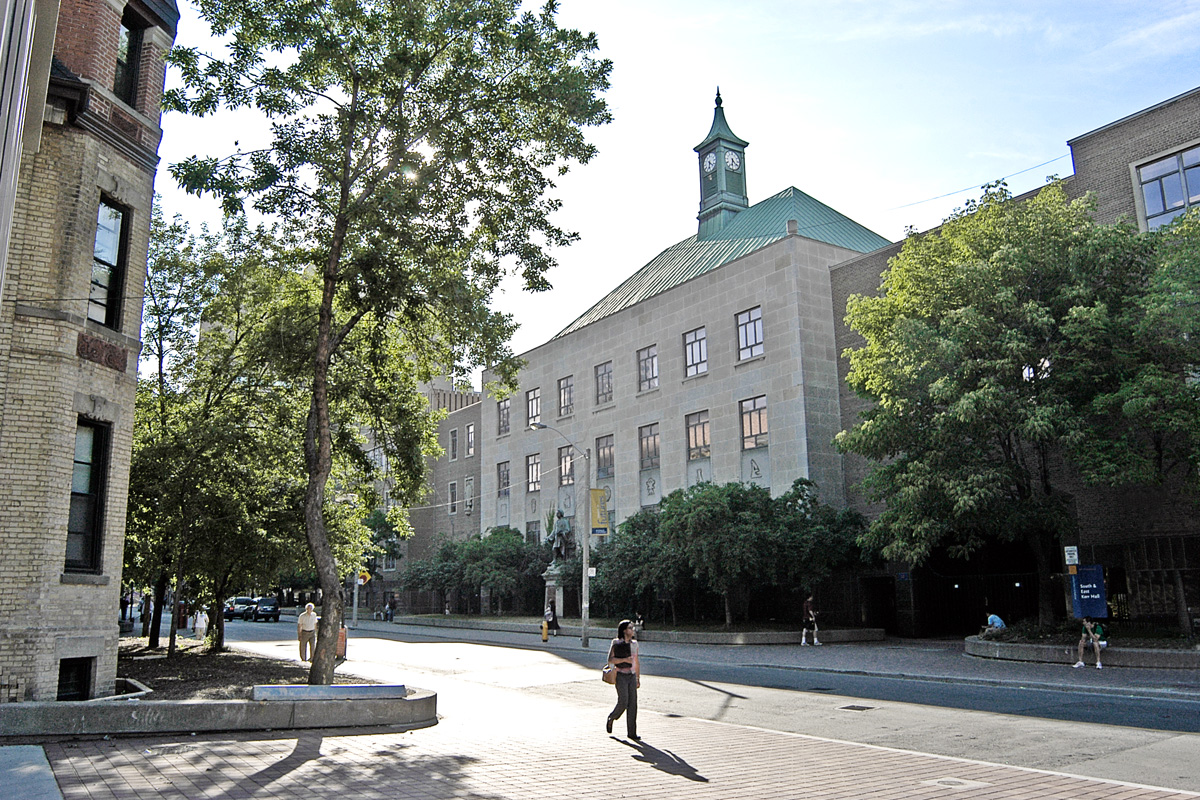
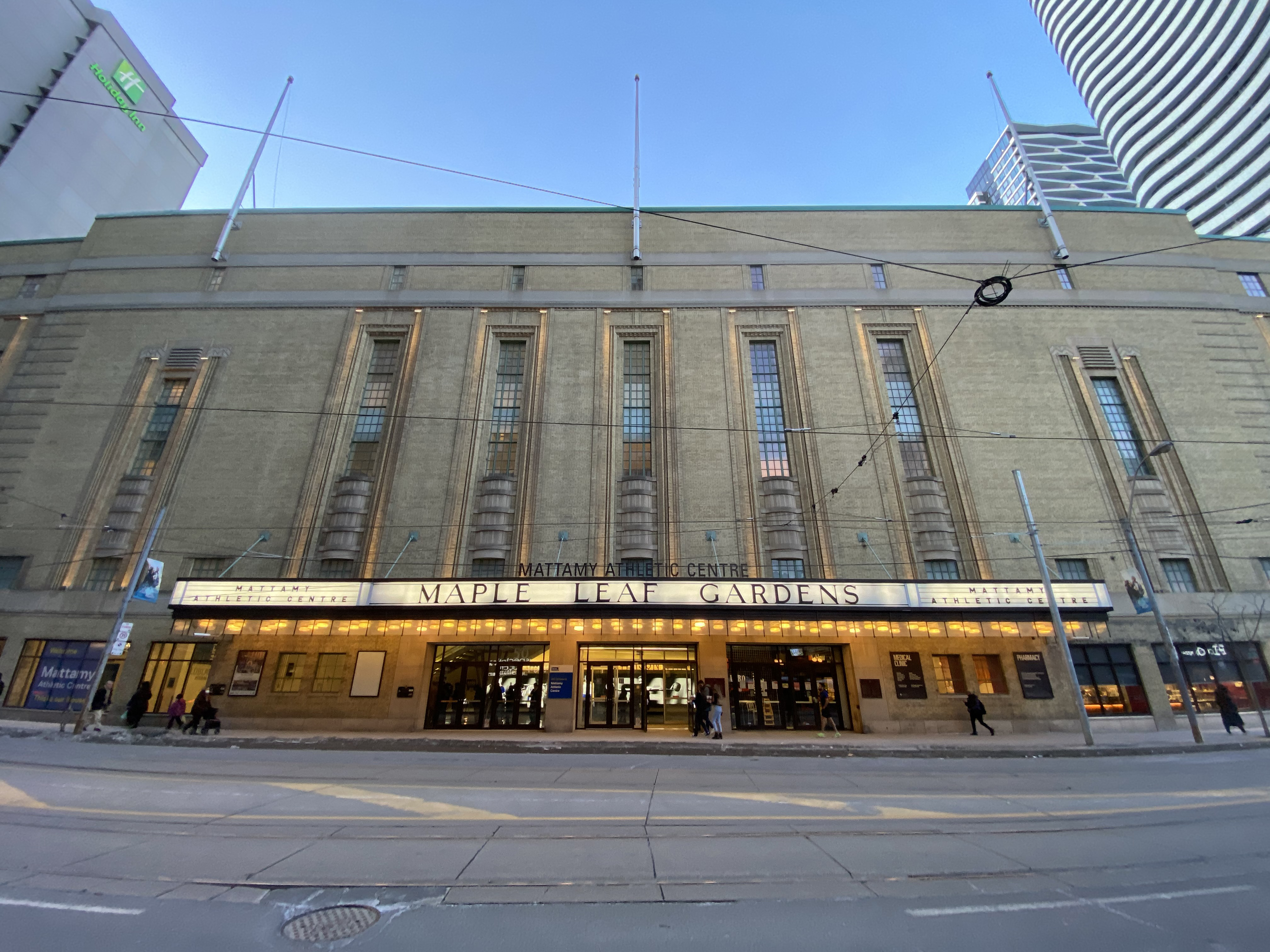
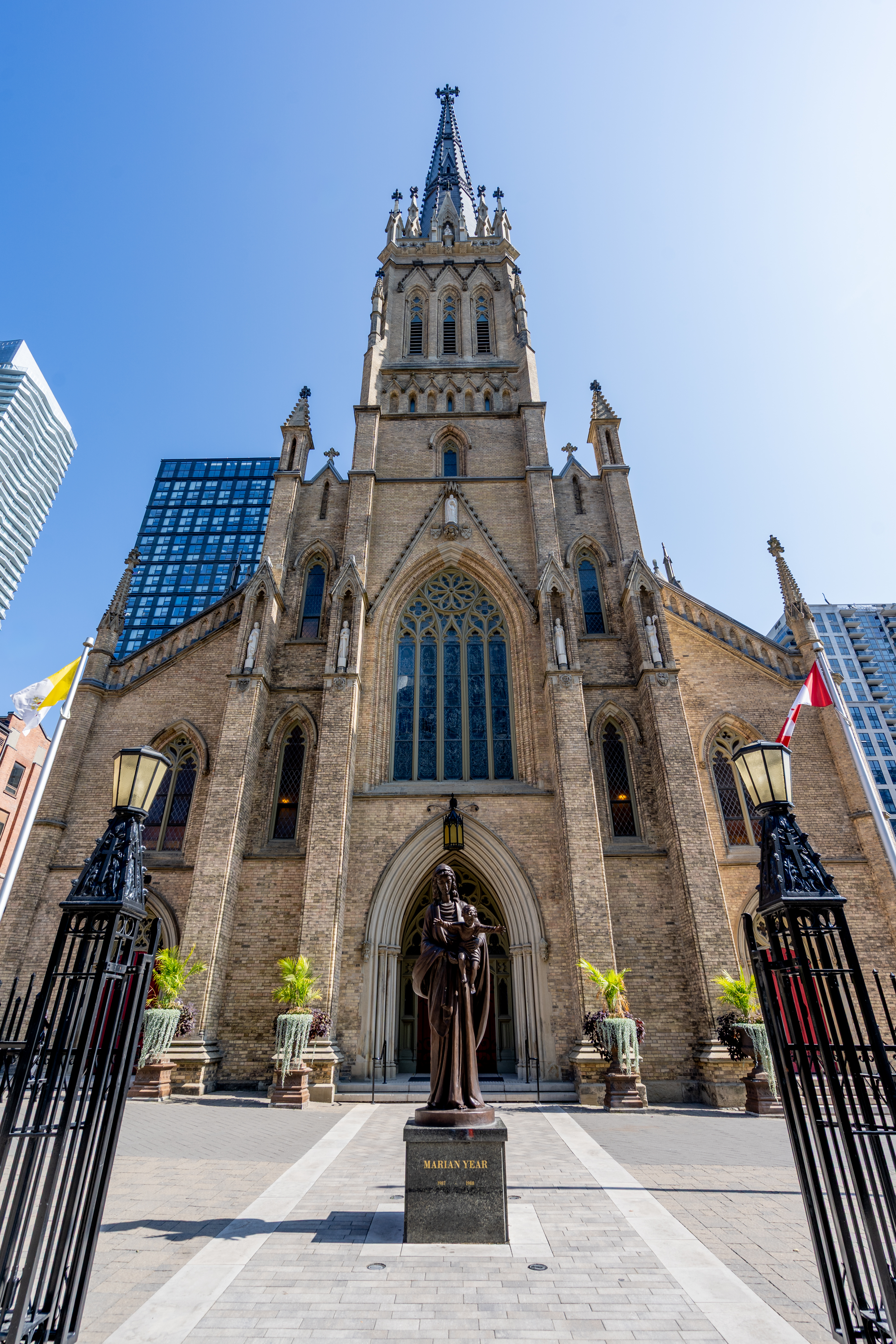
- Allan Gardens Conservatory Gallery Arcturus Sankofa Square Massey Hall Toronto Metropolitan University Maple Leaf Gardens St. Michael's Cathedral Basilica

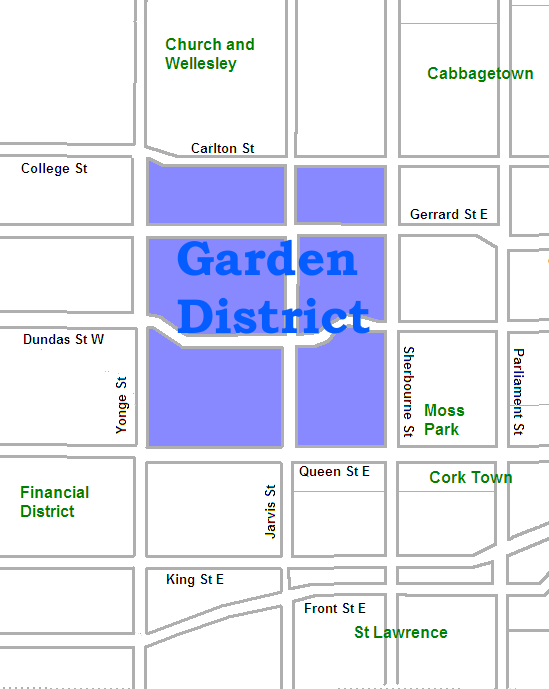
- Country: Canada
- Province: Ontario
- City: Toronto

Government
  - Type: Ward 13 of Toronto City Council
  - City councillor: Chris Moise

Ontario Heritage Act
- Designated: Dec 10, 2021

The Garden District is a neighbourhood in downtown Toronto, Ontario, Canada. The name was selected by the Toronto East Downtown Residents Association (TEDRA) in recognition of Allan Gardens, an indoor botanical garden located nearby at the intersection of Carlton and Jarvis Streets. The Garden District was officially designated by the Mayor and Toronto City Council in 2001, while TEDRA has since been renamed the Garden District Residents Association. Part of the neighbourhood is within official City of Toronto neighbourhood of Moss Park.

As defined by the Association, the neighbourhood is bordered by Carlton Street to the north, Yonge Street to the west, Sherbourne Street to the east and Queen Street to the south. This area includes the southern part of Toronto’s Gay Village and heritage sites such as the Mackenzie House Museum, Gallery Arcturus, the Merchandise Building and Allan Gardens.

== Character ==
This neighbourhood consists of two distinct areas:

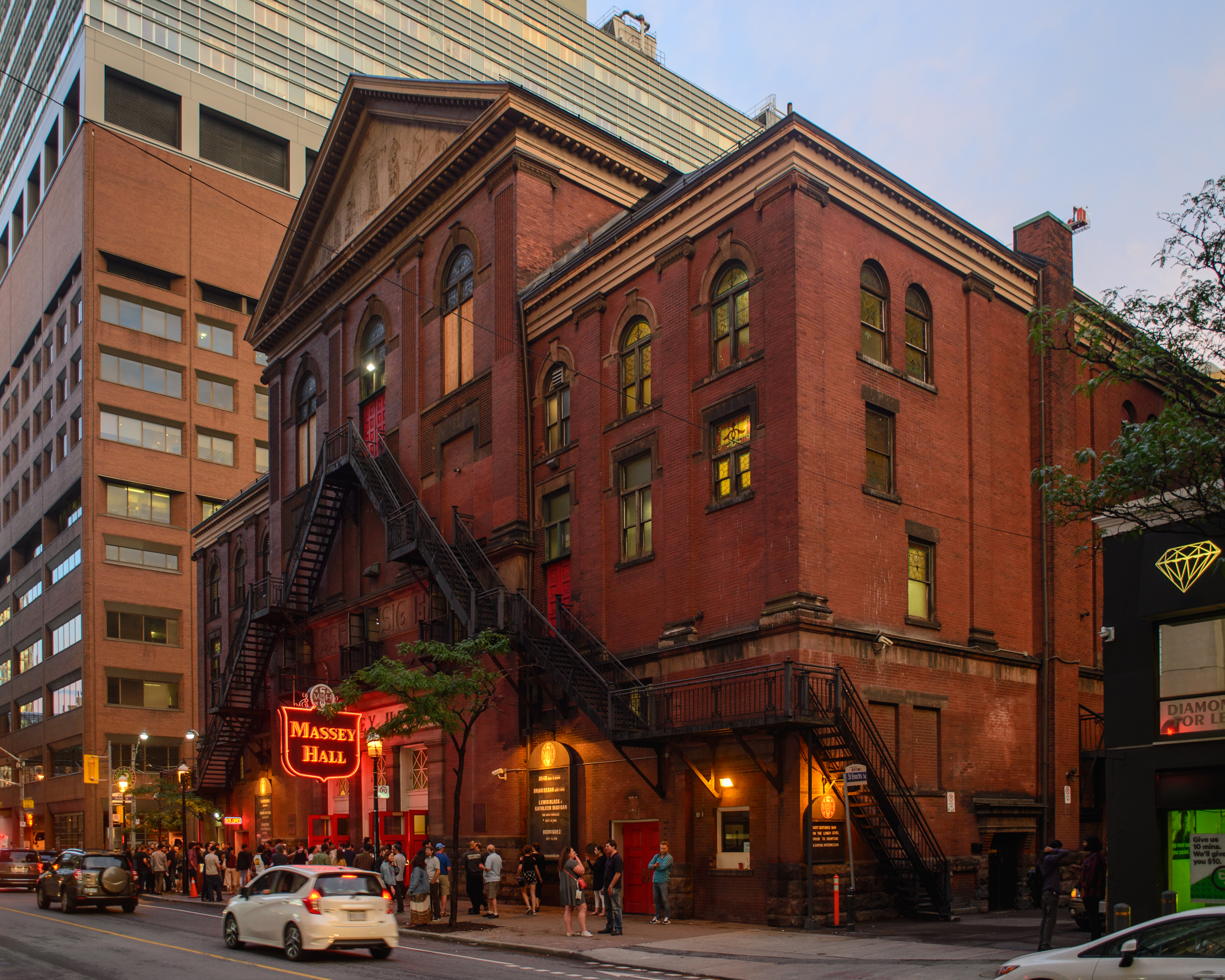
View of the western portion of the Garden District and Massey Hall, looking southeast from Shuter Street.

The western portion, from Yonge Street to Jarvis Street, was first subdivided at the time Toronto was incorporated as a city in 1834 from the McGill Estate (the owner John McGill died that year). This area quickly filled with overflow from central Toronto and includes a number of early, mostly non-government (especially religious) institutions such as the Metropolitan Methodist Church (Metropolitan United Church after church union in the 1920s), St Michael's Roman Catholic Cathedral, the Roman Catholic Bishop's Palace, St. Michael's Choir School and St Michael's Hospital, places of entertainment such as Massey Hall, the Elgin and Winter Garden Theatres, the Canon Theatre (formerly Pantages Theatre) and Maple Leaf Gardens as well as the Ryerson Model School (now a part of Toronto Metropolitan University (TMU)). TMU's campus today stretches from Gerrard in the north, east to Mutual and south of Gould, west to Yonge, and includes The Image Centre, a photographic museum which is home to the Black Star Collection and the yearly Scotiabank Contact Photography Festival. The university's Sheldon & Tracy Levy Student Learning Centre, at the corner of Yonge and Gould streets, serves as the symbolic entrance to the TMU campus and anchors its presence along the Yonge Street retail corridor, near Sankofa Square and the Eaton Centre.

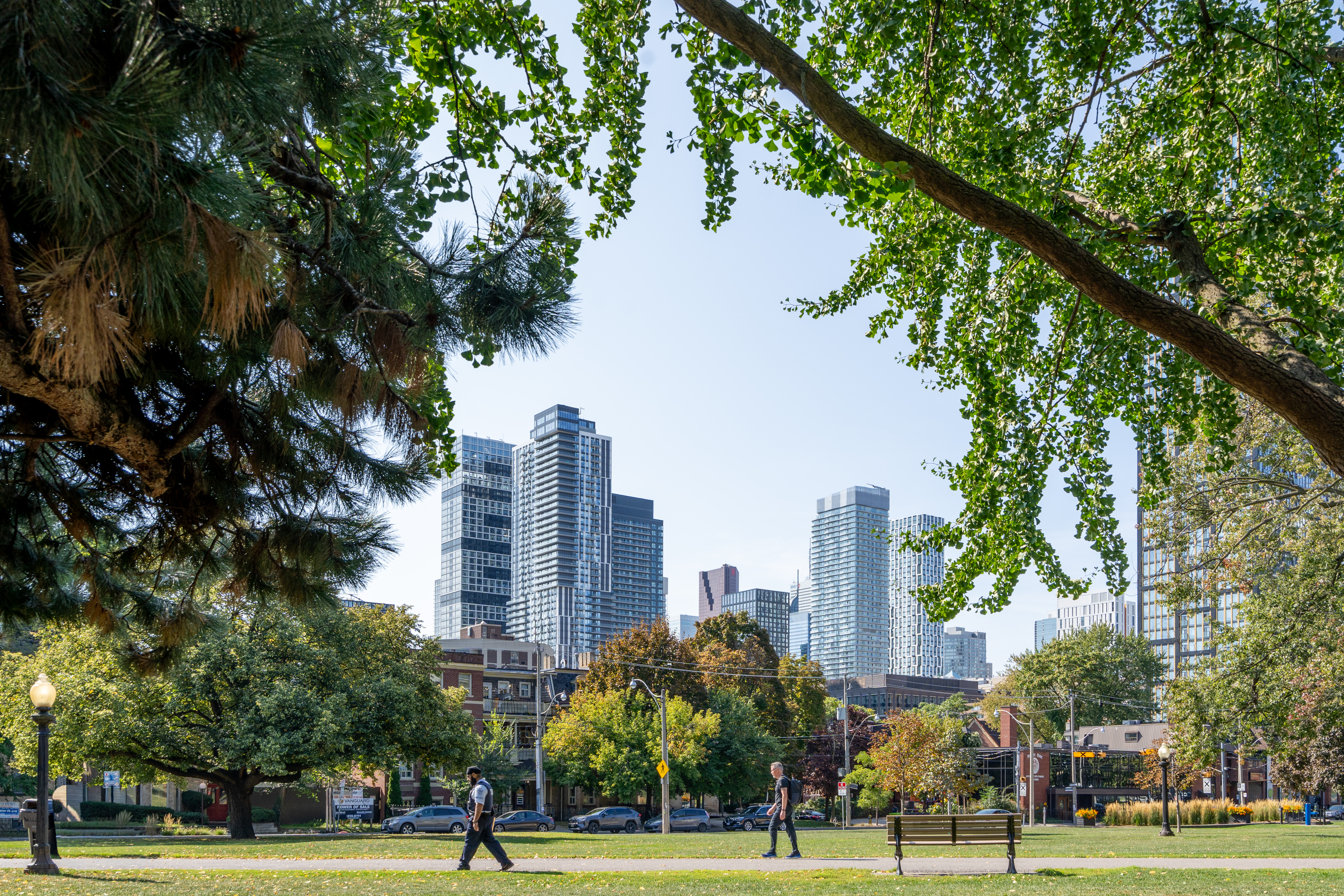
View of the southwest portion of the Garden District from Allan Gardens

The eastern portion from Jarvis Street to Sherbourne was largely subdivided later in the 1850s from the Jarvis Estate (Hazelburn) and the Allan Estate (Moss Park) with north-south streets based on the street grid of the original Town of York. This area is largely residential with two parks (Moss Park and Allan Gardens) and a large number of local churches. It was originally a very exclusive district and declined in time as the housing stock aged and smaller lots for workers were built. This area has seen a large replacement of older homes with residential, institutional and commercial development. Located in the eastern portion of the Garden District, Walnut Hall were four Georgian styled terraced homes. On May 18, 2007, local uproar arose over its demolition. Constructed in 1856 and designated as a heritage site in 1997, the building was nonetheless neglected and began to collapse.

The Garden District includes a mix of housing, from million-dollar condos, renovated Victorian villas, and Edwardian row houses to apartment co-operatives, subsidized housing units, and many hostels and shelters. George Street, one block east of Jarvis has a blighted area around the Seaton House shelter. The City of Toronto government is planning to redevelop the site incorporating heritage homes now boarded up.

== Demographics ==
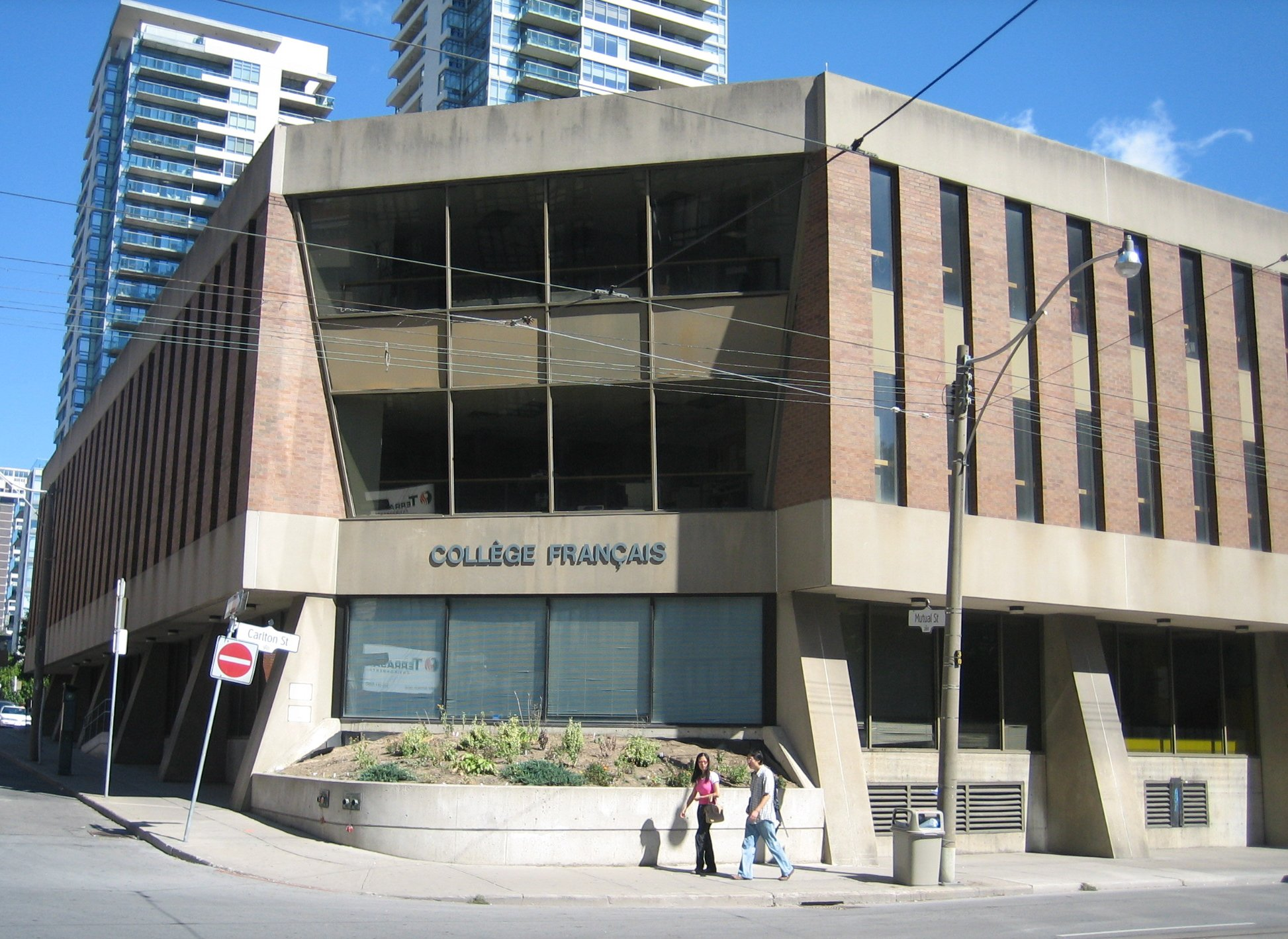
Le Collège français is a French-language public secondary school located directly across the Garden District's northern boundary. It serves Franco-Ontarian residents in the District and other parts of the city.

There is a substantial Francophone presence because of the area’s French-language institutions near the neighbourhood, including Paroisse Sacré Cœur, a Roman Catholic parish, Le Collège français, and École élémentaire Gabrielle-Roy. Le Collège français and École élémentaire Gabrielle-Roy are both operated by Conseil scolaire Viamonde, a secular public school board.

A separate neighbourhood association, the McGill-Granby Village Resident's Association, represents the residents of the area around those two streets.

There are several institutions related to the Aboriginal community along Gerrard Street, the south of Allan Gardens. They include Miziwe Biik Aboriginal Employment and Training, Anishnawbe Health Toronto, and Native Women's Resource Centre of Toronto. According to 2011 National Household Survey, the population with Aboriginal Ancestry of census tract 5350032.00 grew from 105 in 2005 to 165 in 2010. This large increase (+57%) is significant when the total population of CT5350032.00 decreased by almost 4%.

== Transportation ==
The area is well served by public transit, with the 501 Queen, 505 Dundas and 506 Carlton east-west streetcar routes. The Line 1 Yonge–University subway Line 1 runs north-south along Yonge Street to the west. The 75 Sherbourne bus runs north-south along Sherbourne.
