= 222 Jarvis Street =

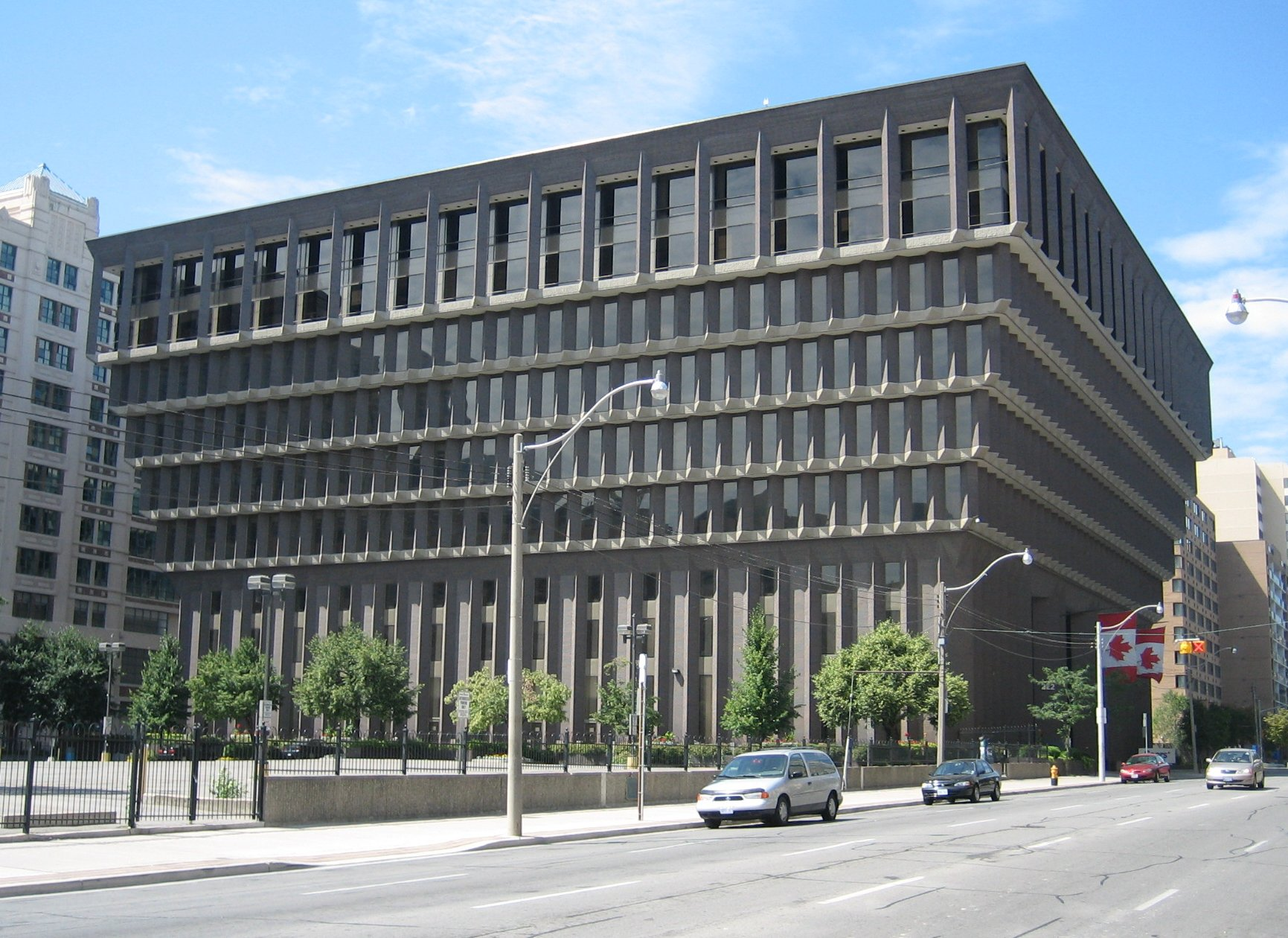
- Interactive map of the 222 Jarvis Street area

General information
- Type: Office building
- Architectural style: Brutalist
- Location: 222 Jarvis Street, Toronto, Ontario, Canada
- Coordinates: 43.65796°N 79.375588°W
- Opened: 1971
- Renovated: 2011
- Renovation cost: CA$100 million
- Owner: Ministry of Infrastructure

Technical details
- Floor count: 10
- Floor area: 58,336 square metres (627,920 sq ft)

Design and construction
- Architect: Maxwell Miller

Renovating team
- Architect: WZMH Architects

222 Jarvis Street is an office building on Jarvis Street in Toronto, Ontario, Canada. The inverted-pyramid-shaped building contains ten storeys and was completed in 1971.

Constructed of pre-cast concrete skinned in dark brown brick veneer, it was designed in the Brutalist style by architect Maxwell Miller as the head office of Sears Canada, a department store chain. It has 58,336 square metres (627,920 sq ft) of gross floor area.

== History ==
The property was sold in 2007 to the Ontario Realty Corporation, Ontario's publicly owned real estate services agency. At that time, Sears Canada relocated its head office to the Toronto Eaton Centre.

The building was once connected to the adjacent building now known as the Merchandise Building, a former department store warehouse, which has since been converted to loft apartments.

The Government of Ontario chose 222 Jarvis Street as a model to show that older buildings can be retrofitted to significantly reduce a building's carbon footprint. The government expected to spend $100 million on the project, including the installation of a green roof, with the objective of achieving Leadership in Energy and Environmental Design (LEED) Gold status for the building.

It was renovated to be used as offices for four ministries: Ministry of Government Services (in 2014 this Ministry was split into the Ministry of Government & Consumer Services and the Treasury Board Secretariat), Energy and Infrastructure, Research and Innovation, Economic Development and Trade, and Training, Colleges and Universities. The renovation was completed in the fall of 2011.

The retrofit was undertaken by WZMH Architects. It was completed under the Government of Ontario's Toronto Accommodation Plan, a ten-year plan to reduce the carbon footprint of most Ontario government office buildings in Toronto.

A new two-storey glass atrium extends from the main-floor lobby and part of the second floor east toward Jarvis Street to bring in more natural light. The building has an escalator system that runs from the basement to the ninth floor. A 190-square-metre (2,000 sq ft) skylight was cut into the roof to allow light into the centre of the building.

Its Green initiatives include reusing, recycling and diverting materials away from landfill, a green roof, reflective roofing materials, a photovoltaic solar rooftop panels, an energy monitoring system, daylight and occupancy sensors for lighting control, rainwater harvesting, and limited parking capacity, access to public transit and bicycle storage to encourage use of alternative modes of transportation.
