= Monarch Park Collegiate Institute =

Monarch Park Collegiate
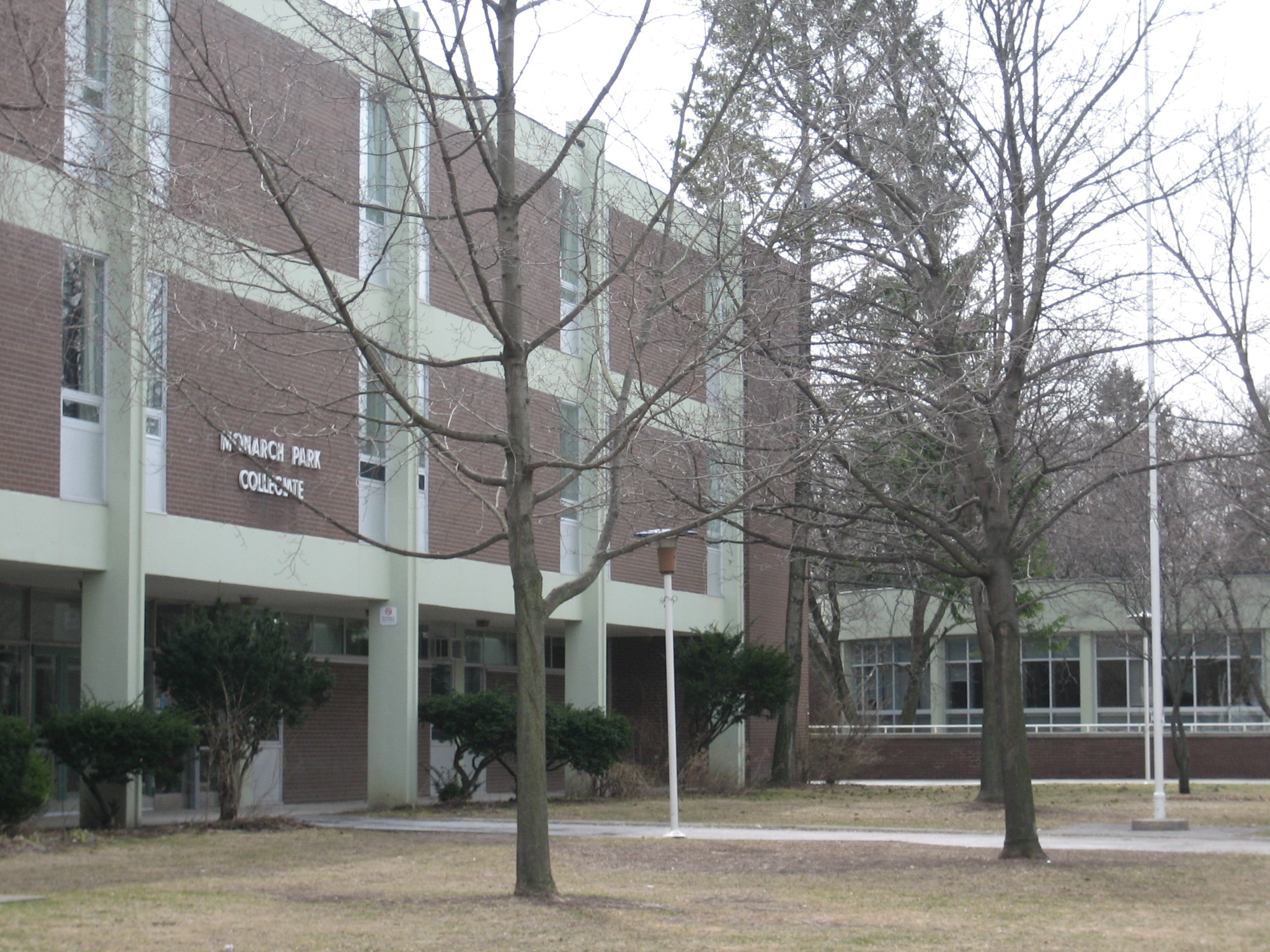

Location
- 1 Hanson Street; East Danforth, Toronto, Ontario, M4J 169; Canada; 43°40′46″N 79°19′22″W

Information
- School type: Public High school IB World School
- Founded: 1964
- School board: Toronto District School Board (Toronto Board of Education)
- Superintendent: Anastasia Poulis
- Area trustee: Sara Ehrhardt
- School number: 5535 / 927384
- Administrator: Ondina Veiga; Connie Cinotti
- Principal: Angel Lau
- Grades: 9-12
- Enrolment: 942 (2013-14)
- Language: English
- Schedule type: Semestered
- Area: Danforth Avenue and Gerrard Street East on Coxwell Avenue
- Colours: Green and Gold
- Mascot: Valour the Lion
- Team name: Monarch Lions Monarch Ducks (swim team)
- Public transit access: TTC: North/South: 22 Coxwell; Rapid Transit: Coxwell
- Website: schoolweb.tdsb.on.ca/monarchparkcollegiate/
- Last updated: November 25, 2025

Monarch Park Collegiate (referred to as MPC, Monarch Park, or Monarch; formerly known as Monarch Park Secondary School) is a high school located near the intersection of Coxwell Avenue and Danforth Avenue in Toronto, Ontario. It is a part of the Toronto District School Board.

== History ==
Monarch Park Collegiate was the first high school built in Toronto after 1937. Construction of the school began in March 1965 and was completed by late August at a cost of $3,751,654.69. In 1966, a third story was added at a cost of $1,245,210.

The land for Monarch Park Collegiate Institute is located in Toronto's East End, an area shaped by clay extraction operations in the early 1900s that provided raw materials for the city's lucrative brick manufacturing sector, necessary for residential and industrial construction.

The school that would later be known as Le Collège français was founded here in 1979, before moving to the Jarvis Collegiate in 1981.

Monarch Park Collegiate is an International Baccalaureate World School, offering the IB Prep program for students in Grades 9 and 10 and the IB Diploma Programme for students in Grades 11 and 12.

== Overview ==
Monarch Park Collegiate Institute is known as an excellent secondary school that offers a complete semestered program, open for extremely limited out-of-district student enrolment. Monarch Park Collegiate is a 'Global School' that embraces a philosophy of global education, focusing on human rights education, peace education, international development, and environmentalism. The staff and students are from over 100 different countries and speak almost as many languages.

=== Campus ===
In terms of facilities, the large group instruction room was constructed to allow topics to be presented to approximately 150 people and also greatly reduced repetition of the same material. The library, located in the same wing of the school, was constructed with a mezzanine that is capable of seating about 80 students. This mezzanine was constructed so that students could study and be in easy reach of the library's research books and other material. The auditorium, also located in the same wing, is equipped with a lighting and acoustics system.

The eastern wing was constructed with a modern swimming pool, measuring 75' × 35' and varying in depth from 3' to 9½', lined on one side by a gallery. In the summer of 2011, the pool area underwent renovations after being temporarily closed the year before.

On the southern end of the school property is Monarch Park Stadium, which has an artificial turf soccer field that can be transformed into a rugby, football, or field hockey ground and also has a synthetic rubberized Olympic track. The stadium is able to operate year-round due to an air-supported structure placed on it during the winter, able to protect the field from the elements.

=== Other ===
The official mascot, to represent strength, is the Monarch Park Lion named Valour.

The film The Virgin Suicides, directed by Sofia Coppola, was filmed on location throughout the school.

During the 2009-2010 school year, NDP party leader Jack Layton visited the school during an effort to help keep it open to the students and public.

=== Kenya Program ===
This was a program in Canada, where Monarch Park Collegiate partnered with Toronto-based Free the Children (FTC). Thirteen students who were in the midst of studying courses on leadership, international development, human rights education, and issues related to Africa and the developing world travelled to Kenya in November 2006. There, for a month, students worked with the people of the Maasai Mara to build schools, plant trees, and teach English.

Two years later, thirteen more students travelled to Kenya again, for 25 days. After returning to Toronto, students from both trips visited various schools within the GTA as Free the Children Ambassadors, telling their stories and urging students to get involved.

Monarch Park has continued to be one of the top contributing high schools to FTC and was featured in chapter 7 of the organization's book, Me to We.

== Notable Students & Alumni ==
- Penny Oleksiak - Olympic champion swimmer (Rio 2016, Tokyo 2020, Paris 2024); most decorated Canadian Olympian
- Eric Lindros - NHL hockey player. Played for Philadelphia, New York, Toronto, and Dallas. Retired 2007.

== See also ==
- Education in Ontario
- List of secondary schools in Ontario
