= Inverted pyramid (architecture) =

Structure in the shape of an upside-down pyramid

In architecture, an inverted pyramid is a structure in the shape of an upside-down pyramid.

The Hanoi Museum and Hong Kong Coliseum are buildings which have an inverted pyramidal shape. The Pyramide Inversée in Paris is a skylight of this shape. The Tokyo Big Sight's conference tower consists of four inverted pyramids mounted on support bases. Whitney Museum is another example and its inverted pyramid design allowed the building to gain an unusual spatial distribution and conform to the New York City's zoning requirements. The Tempe Municipal Building's inverted pyramidal shape helps in keeping the building cool in summer and warm in winter. The same applies to Slovak Radio Building in Bratislava, Slovakia. The inverted pyramid can also be integrated as a component of a structure such as the case of the stalactite work design, which is formed by an intricate corbeling of brackets, squinches and inverted pyramids. In addition to the hidden safety hazards, it is also one of the challenges for the public to accept such a style. At the design level, architects need to carefully consider the design of the internal structure and materials of the building while ensuring aesthetics.

== Examples ==
=== Boston City Hall ===
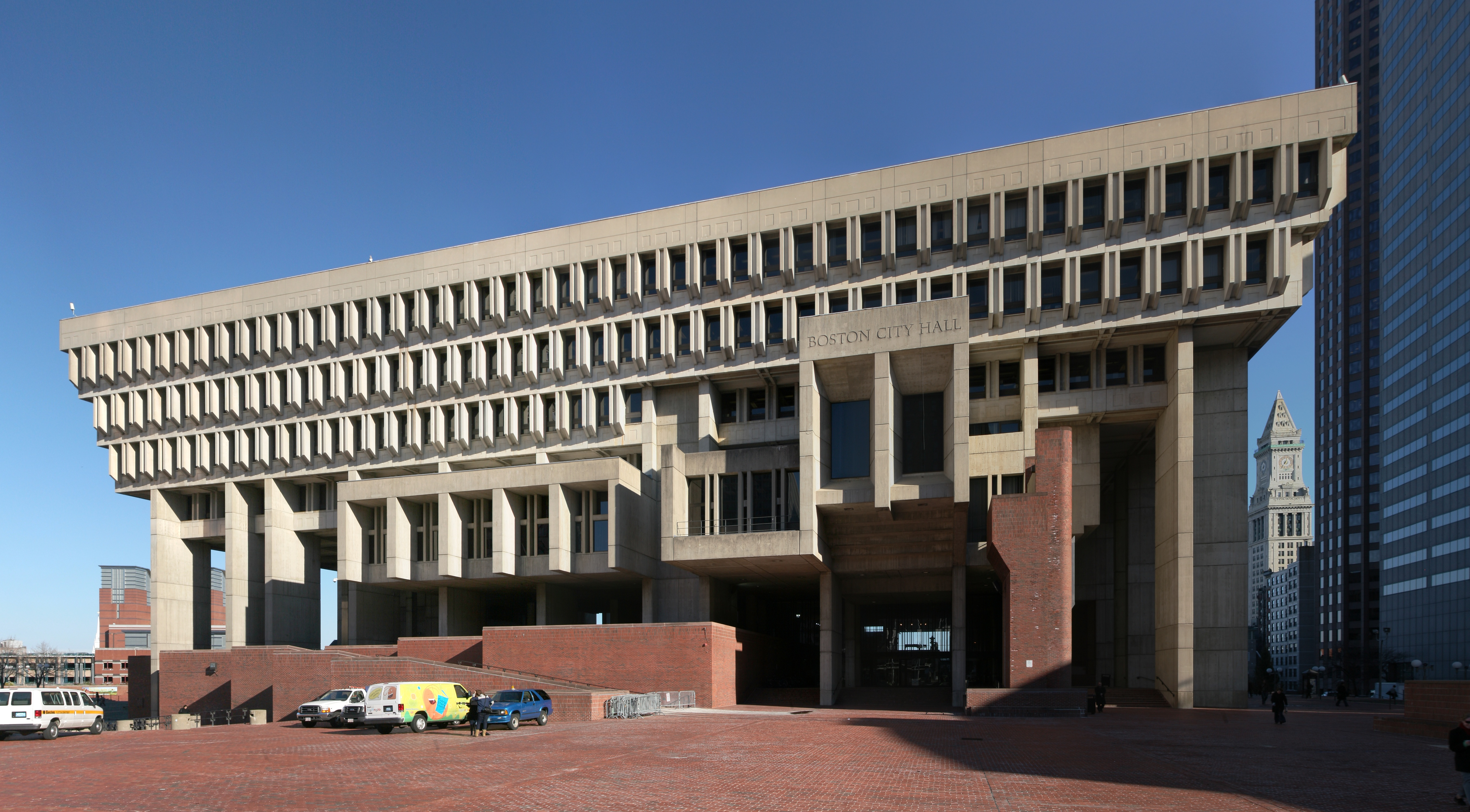
Boston City Hall

In terms of the time it was built and opened, the earliest inverted pyramid building dates back to Boston City Hall in 1968. It was designed by the architecture firms Campbell, Aldrich & Nulty and Kallmann McKinnell & Knowles. Architects draws on examples of medieval Italian town halls and the Boston's 19th-century granite structures. It replaced the old town hall and is still in use today.

=== 222 Jarvis Street ===
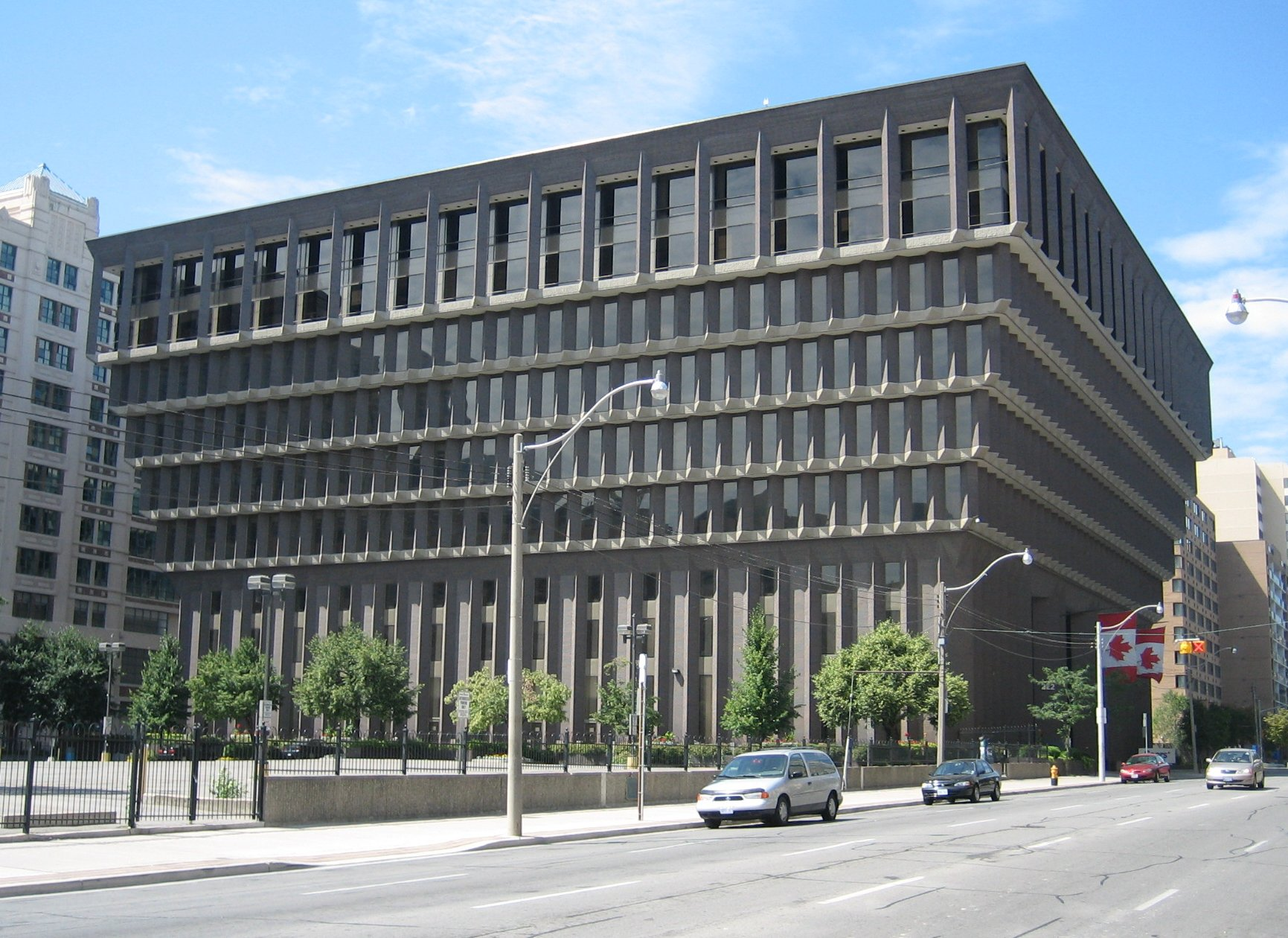
222 Jarvis Street

The 222 Jarvis Street, as an office building in Toronto, was completed in 1971. It was designed by architect Maxwell Miller. The brutalist-style building is currently being used as the headquarters of Sears Canada, which is a department store chain.

=== Rainier Tower ===
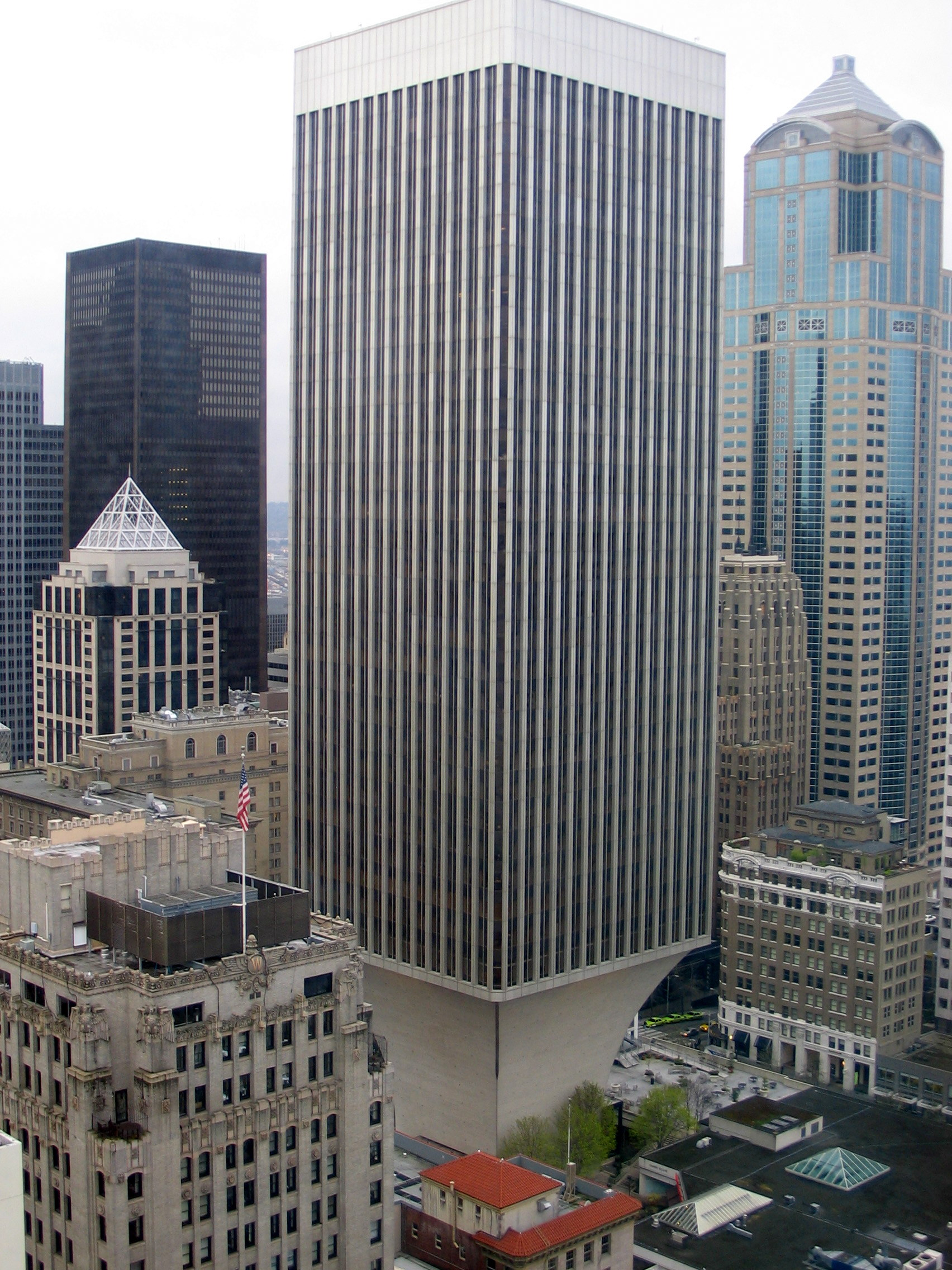
Rainier Tower in Seattle

The Rainier Tower, which is a 156.56-meter (513.6 ft) skyscraper, was built in 1977 and was designed by Minoru Yamasaki. This skyscraper is the tallest building to date to contain an inverted pyramid structure, which is a 37-meter (121 ft) concrete pedestal base. The designer Yamasaki mentioned that this structure provides a larger space for the ground shopping plaza while preserving the green plants.

=== Pyramid on Central ===
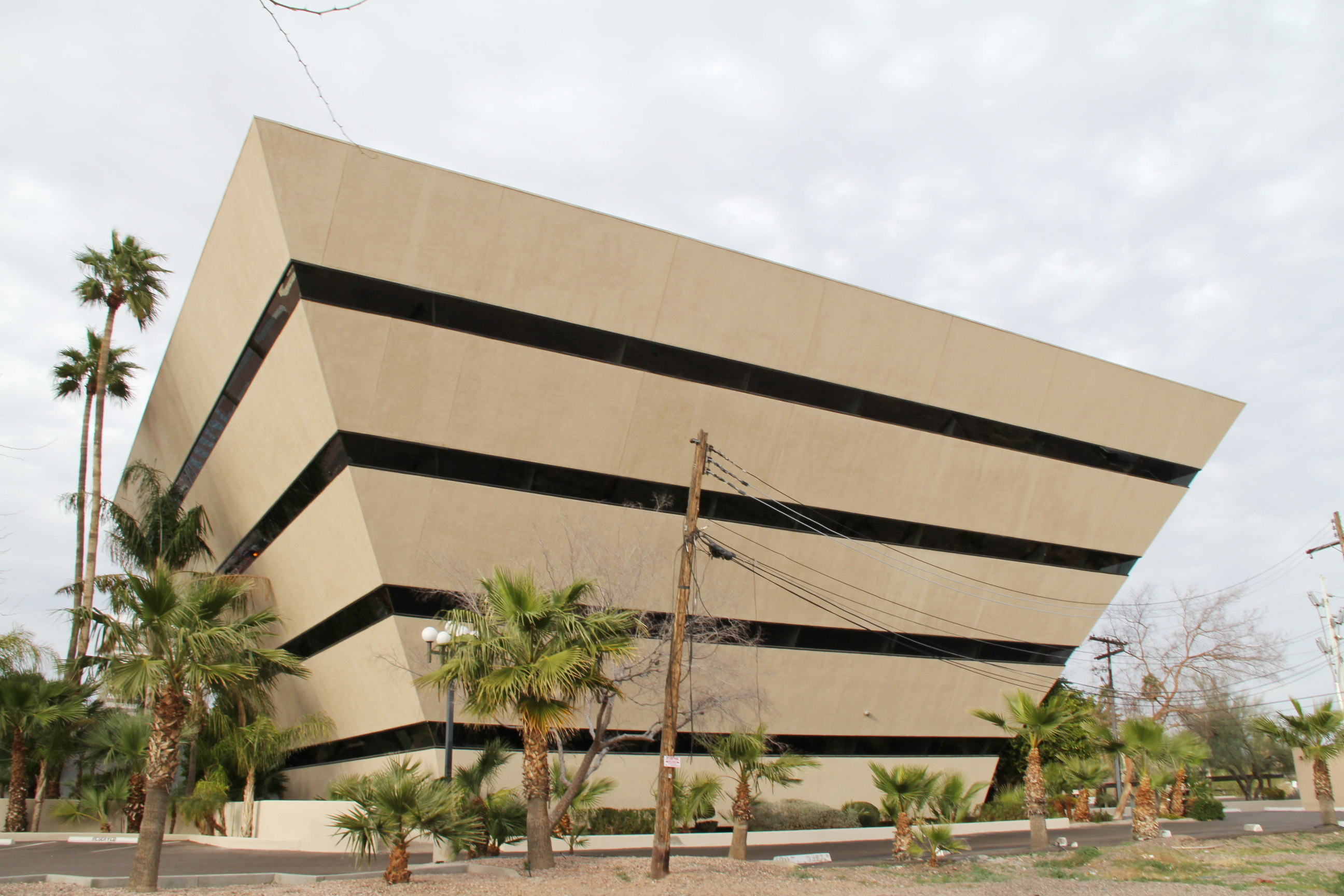
Pyramid on Central, Phoenix AZ USA

The Pyramid on Central was built in 1979 and designed by architect Thomas Hite. It has five floors and totals 36,070 ft^{2} (3,351 m^{2}). From now on, it still been using as an official building in Phoenix, AZ.

=== Hong Kong Coliseum ===
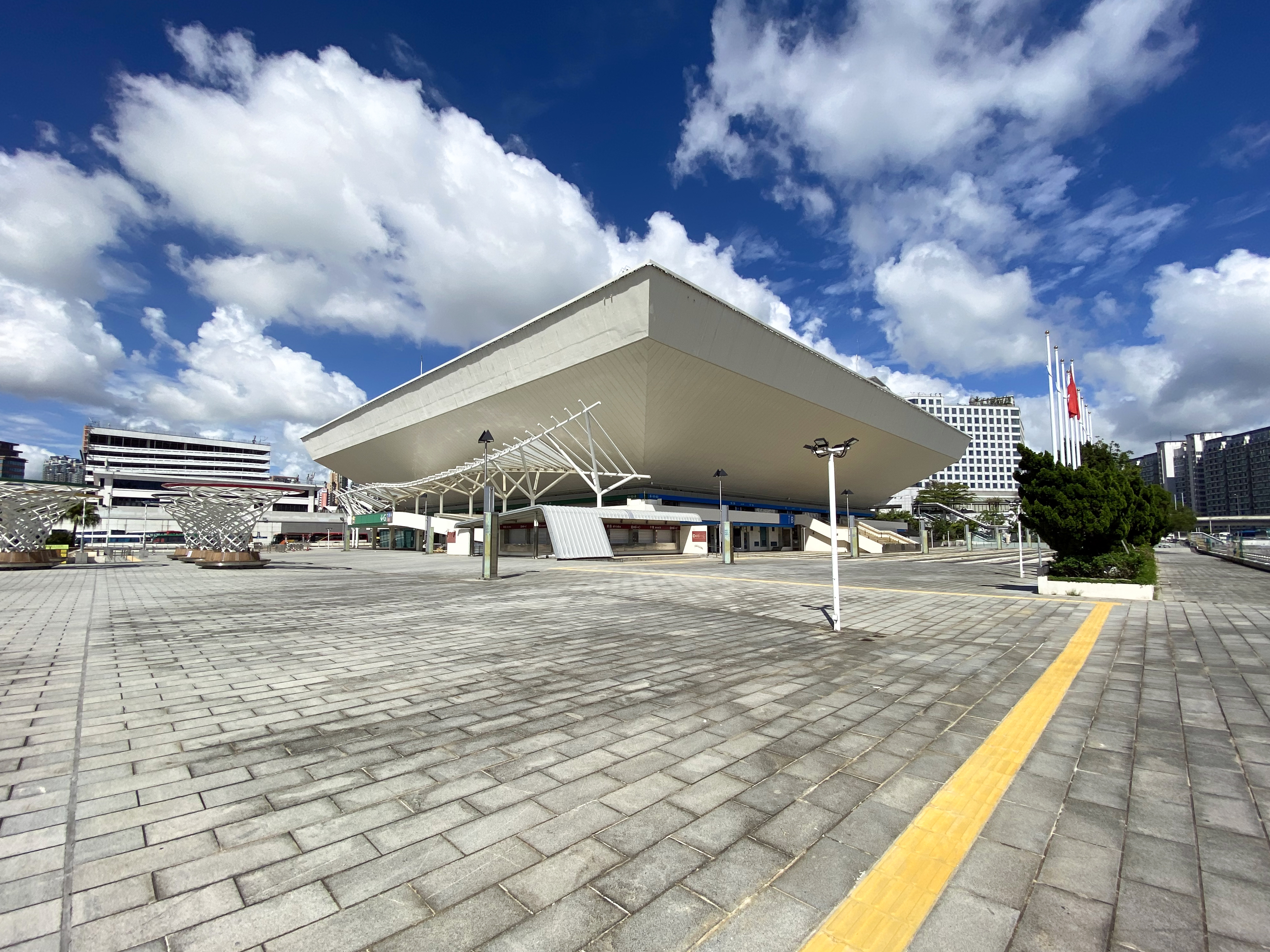
Hong Kong Coliseum

The Hong Kong Coliseum was completed in August 1981 and opened in 27th April 1983. It was designed by Chinese architect Shaoxiong Bao. It shaped like a diamond or an upside-down pyramid, and has 12,500 seats without any pillars. Since the opening period, hundreds of celebrities have come to the coliseum to hold concerts.

=== Slovak Radio Building ===
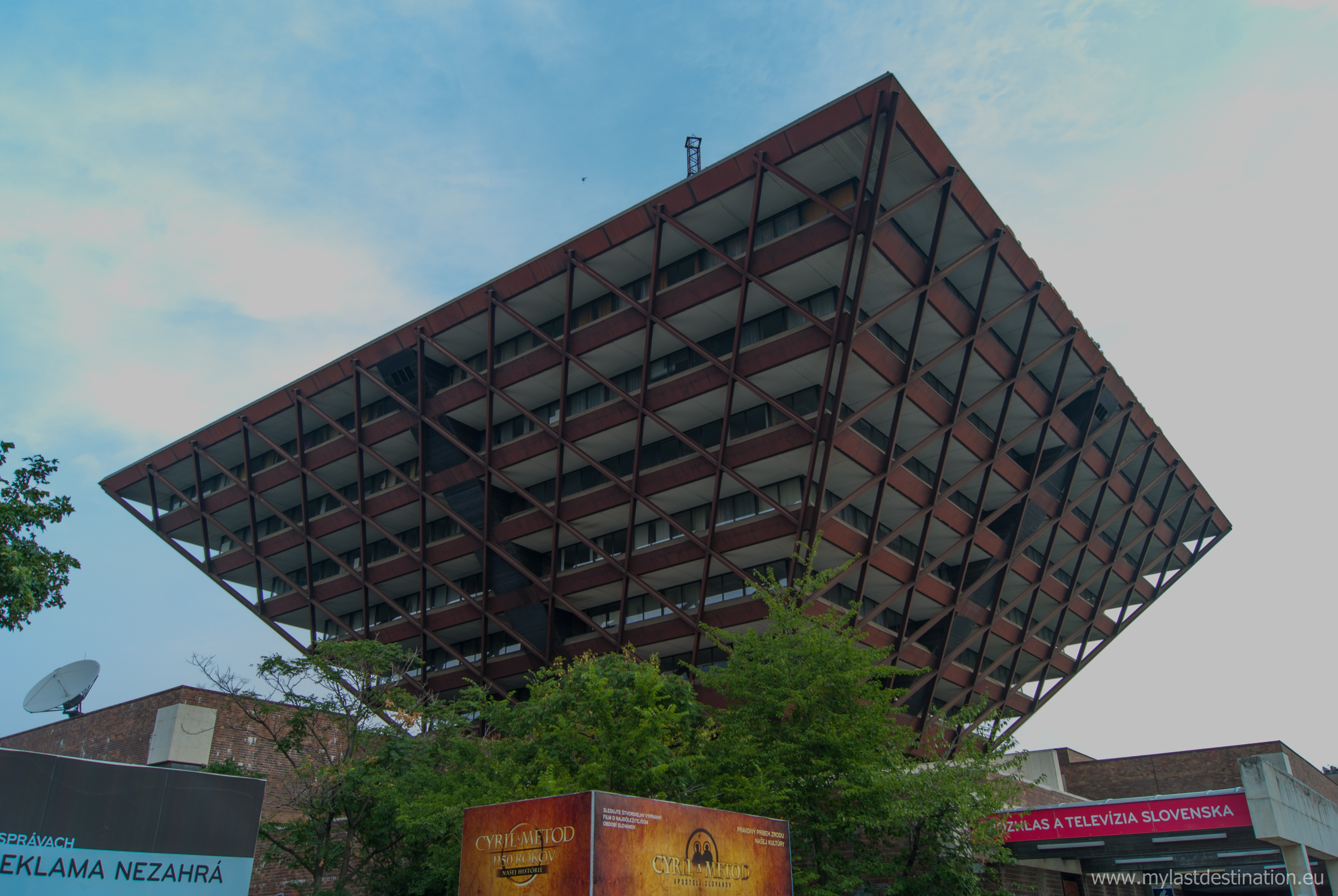
Slovak Radio Building

The Slovak Radio Building, located in Bratislava, was completed in 1983 and the architects were Barnabáš Kissling, Štefan Svetko and Štefan Ďurkovič. The height of the building reach 80 meters (260 ft). As a concert hall, it has 522 seats with concert organ and has had regular broadcasting since 1985.

=== Egyptian Embassy ===
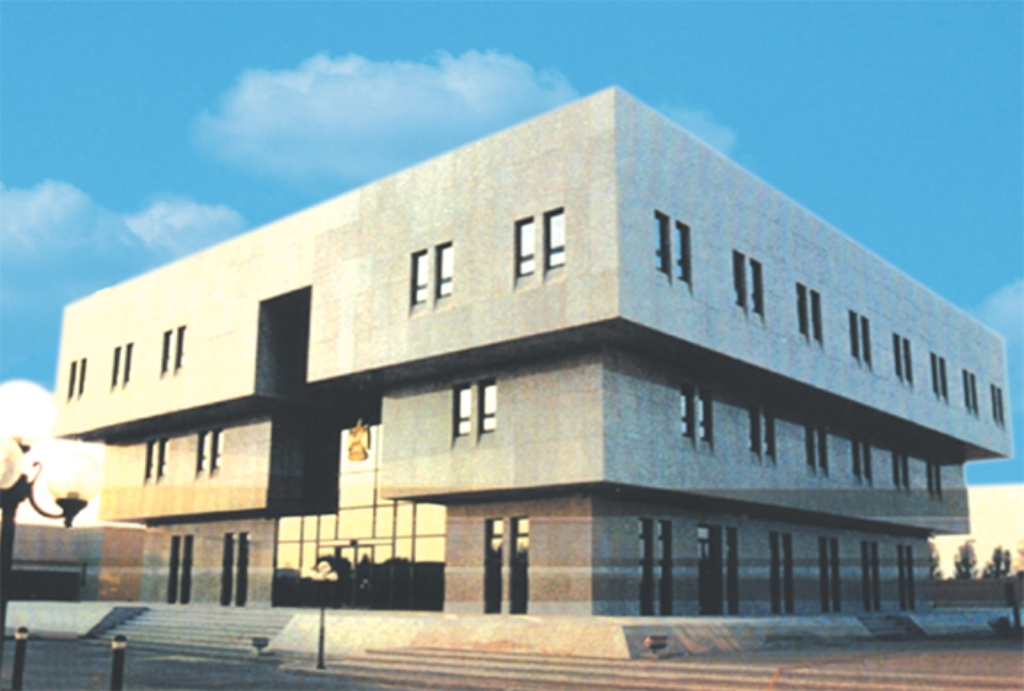
Egyptian Embassy in Abu Dhabi, United Arab Emirates

The Egyptian Embassy, located in Abu Dhabi, was built in 1986 and designed by Egyptian architect Abdul Rahman Makhlouf. It has 77,500 ft^{2} (7,200 m^{2}) built up area. The Architecture was expressed by granite stepped upside-down pyramid, reflecting a traditional Egyptian style design.

=== Louvre Inverted Pyramid ===
Louvre Inverted Pyramid

The Louvre Inverted Pyramid (Pyramide Inversée) is a skylight constructed in the underground shopping mall. The glass pyramid designed and built by I.M. Pei is 21 meters (69 ft) high and 30 meters (98 ft) wide at the bottom, standing in the center of the courtyard. Its four sides are made up of six hundred and seventy-three pieces of diamond-shaped glass. The total floor area is about 2,000 square meters (22,000 sq ft). The total weight of the tower is 200 tons, of which the net weight of glass is 105 tons, and the metal support is only 95 tons. In other words, the load on the stand exceeds its own weight. It was advanced to the final of Benedictus Awards in 1995.

=== Tokyo Big Sight ===
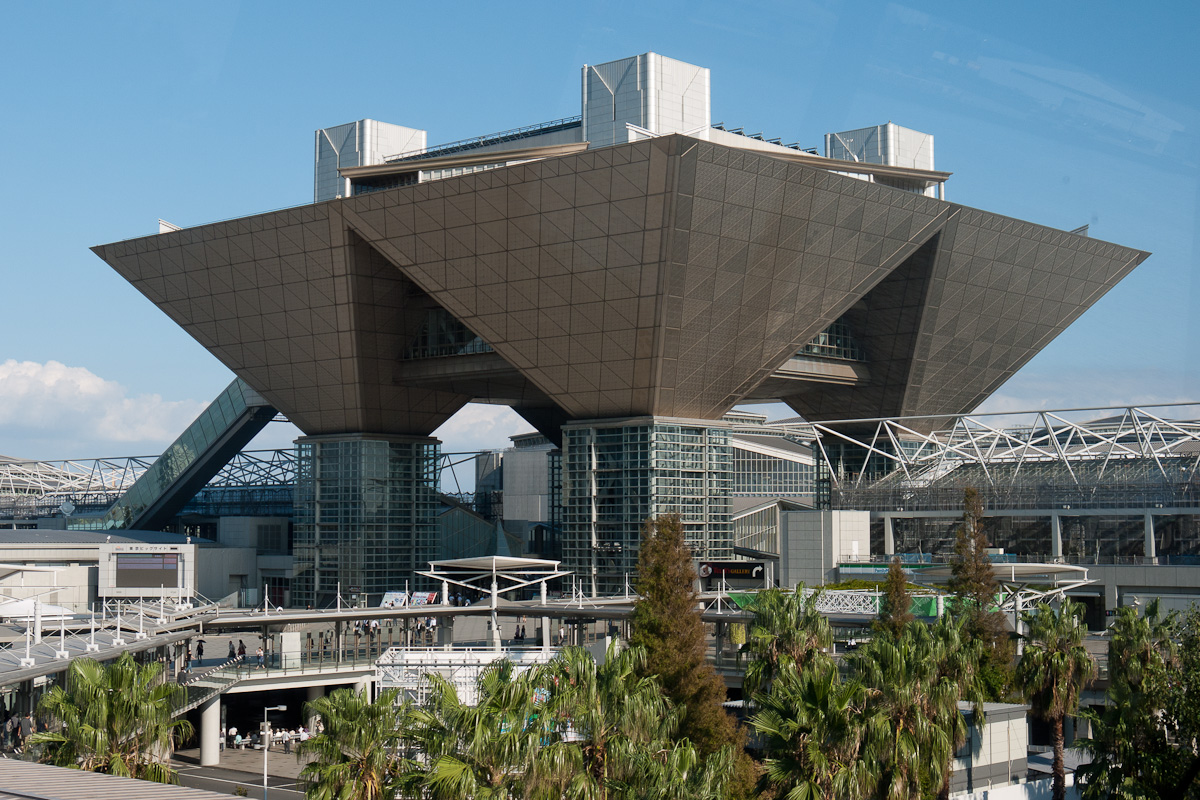
Tokyo Big Sight

The Tokyo International Exhibition Center, also known as Tokyo Big Sight, is an exhibition centre in Tokyo, designed by AXS Satow Architectural group. It is located in Koto District, Tokyo, Japan, with a total exhibition area of more than 80,000 square meters (860,000 sq ft). It is the largest exhibition venue in Japan and one of the most famous tourist attractions in Japan. Tokyo Big Sight was built in 1995 and mainly consists of conference building, east exhibition building, west exhibition building and other related facilities.

=== Hanoi Museum ===
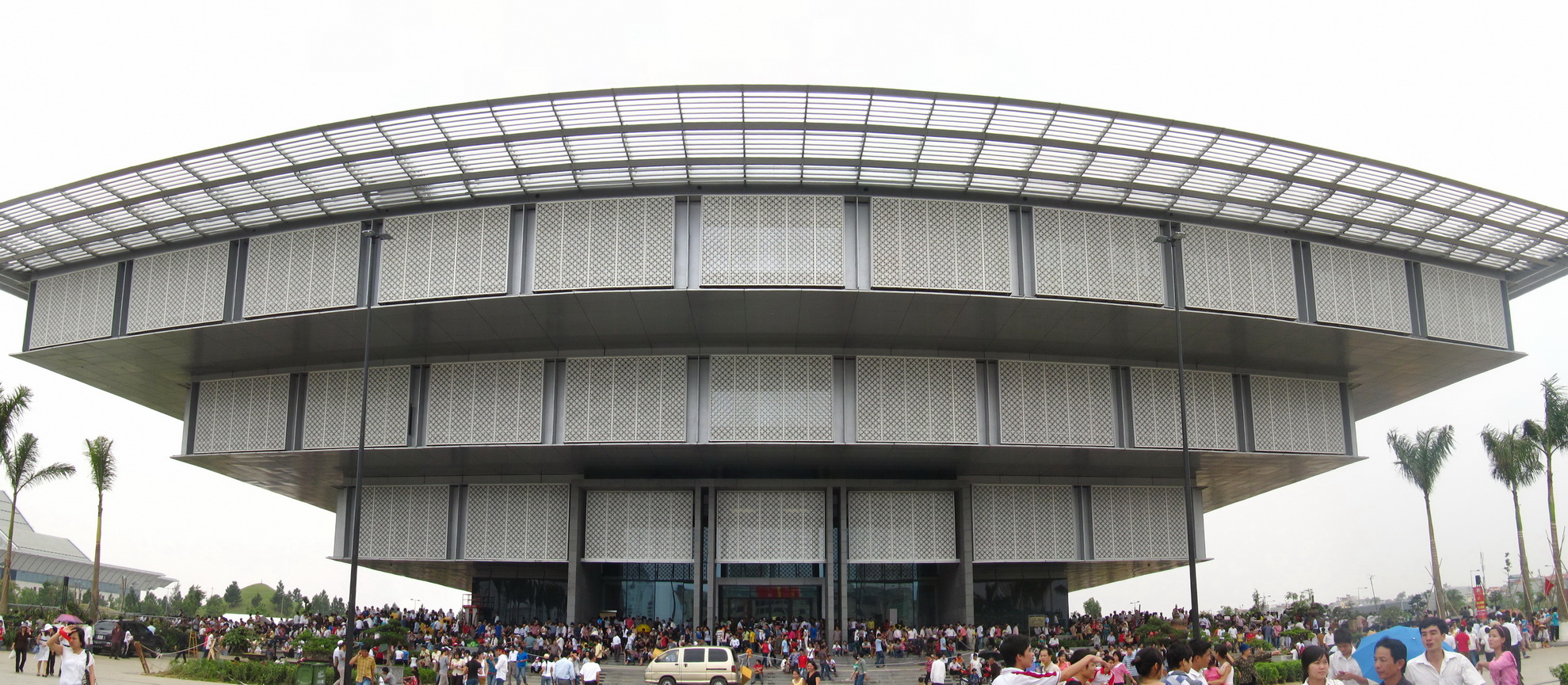
Hanoi Museum

The Hanoi Museum, located in Vietnam, was designed by GMP Architekten and built in 2010. As a museum, it represents the artifact of Hanoi over 1000 years, and it also displays the culture and heritage of Vietnam. The total area of the building is nearly 1772 ft.

== Limitations ==
Inverted pyramids, with their narrow bases, are inherently less stable than more traditional structures. This poses engineering challenges, notably for high-precision manufacturing of materials. Outer structural elements are usually made lighter than the strong core, particularly for structures subjected to earthquakes or high winds.

== Criticism ==
Inverted pyramids are often criticized for their unusual aesthetics; the Slovak Radio Building, in particular, has appeared on lists of the world's ugliest buildings. Architects designing such structures have been accused of deliberately breaking established design principles for shock value and publicity. Structures like Boston City Hall, acclaimed by architects for its unconventional style, remain unpopular with the public for their perceived "inhumanity".

== Tourism ==
Iconic buildings have an enduring presence character, promoting the development of the tourism industry. At the same time, the tourism economy of regions with unique buildings will also be improved accordingly.

Although most architects do not prioritize the tourism effect of a building when designing, it is undeniable that the unique appearance of a building can bring additional tourism value. As a unique architectural style, the inverted pyramid building can also produce certain benefits for the tourism industry.

The Hong Kong Coliseum, as a building opened for use in 1984, has held many large-scale projects such as concerts, music festivals, and university gatherings without interruption. The financial returns of the Hong Kong Coliseum have been at a high level, attracting tourists from all over the world. Among them, between 1992 and 1993, the utilization rate was as high as 91%, and there were more than 2 million paying customers.

Tokyo Big Sight hosts about 300 events every year and is visited by about 14 million tourists from all over the world. It hosts about 300 events every year and is visited by about 14 million tourists from all over the world. In order to cope with such a huge passenger flow, Tokyo Big Sight is about 30 minutes away from Tokyo Station, and about 15 minutes away from Haneda Airport. At the same time, about 4,700 accommodations have been opened around Tokyo Big Sight.

== Gallery ==
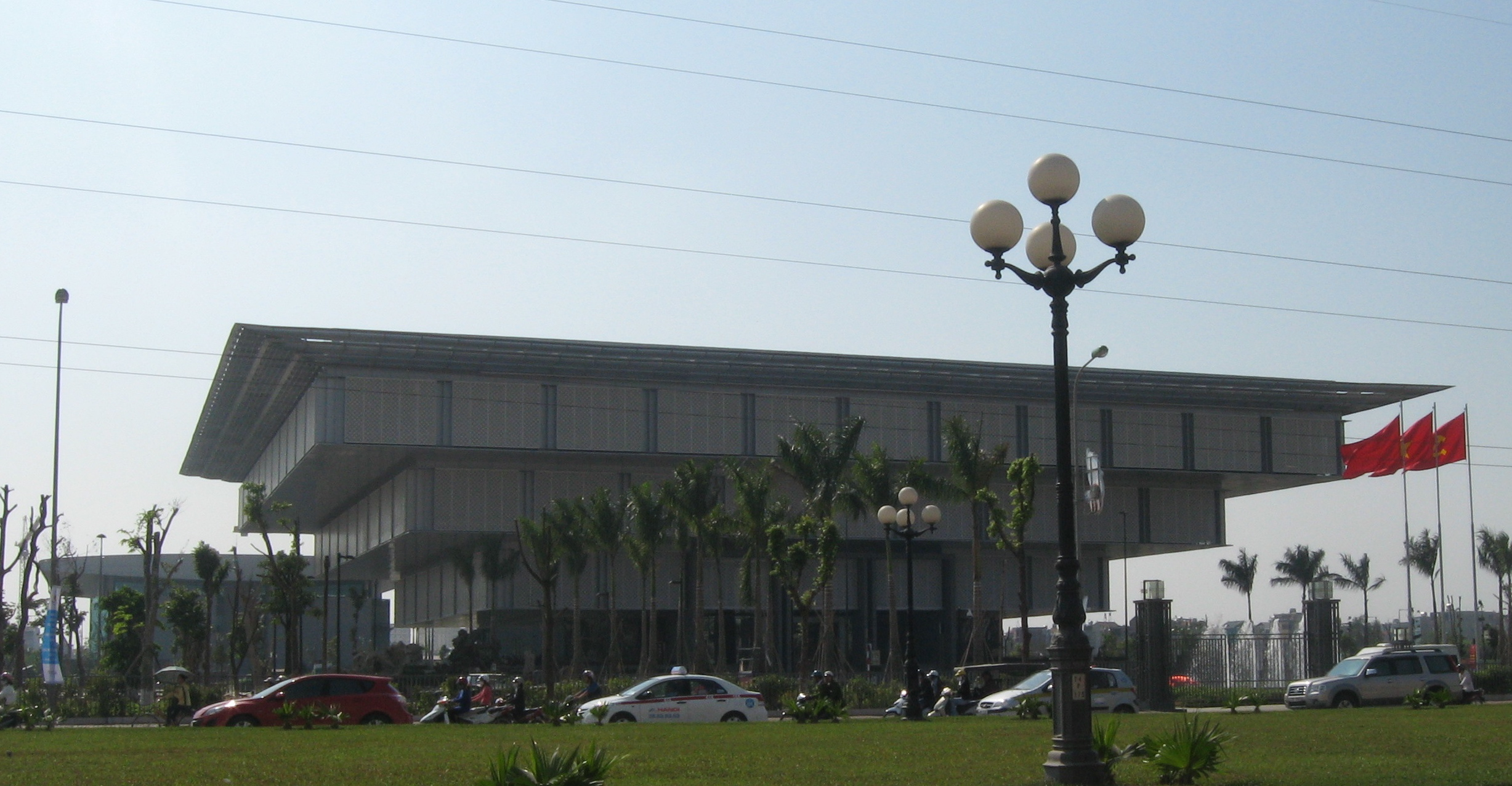
Hanoi Museum

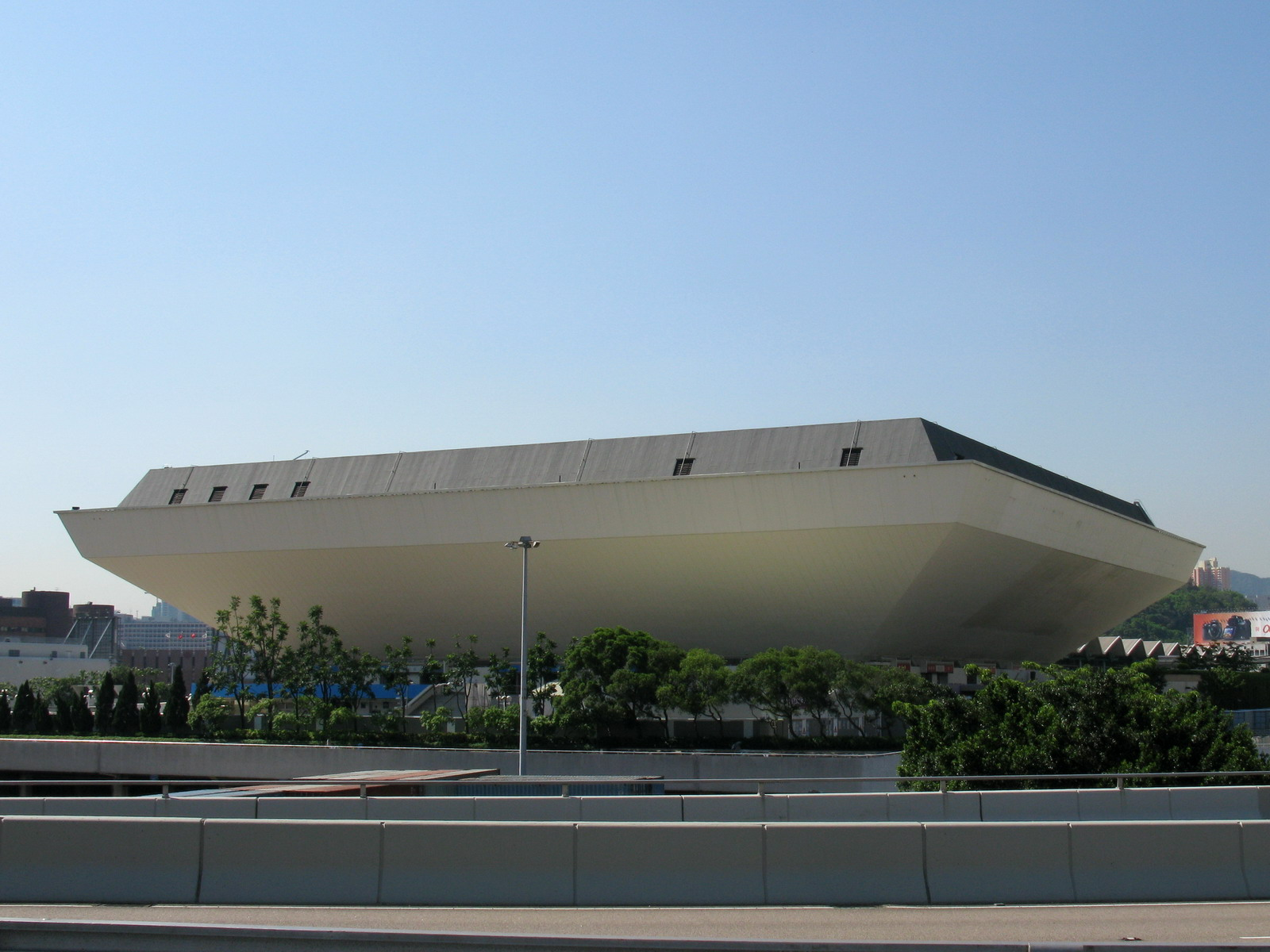
Hong Kong Coliseum

Louvre Pyramide Inversée

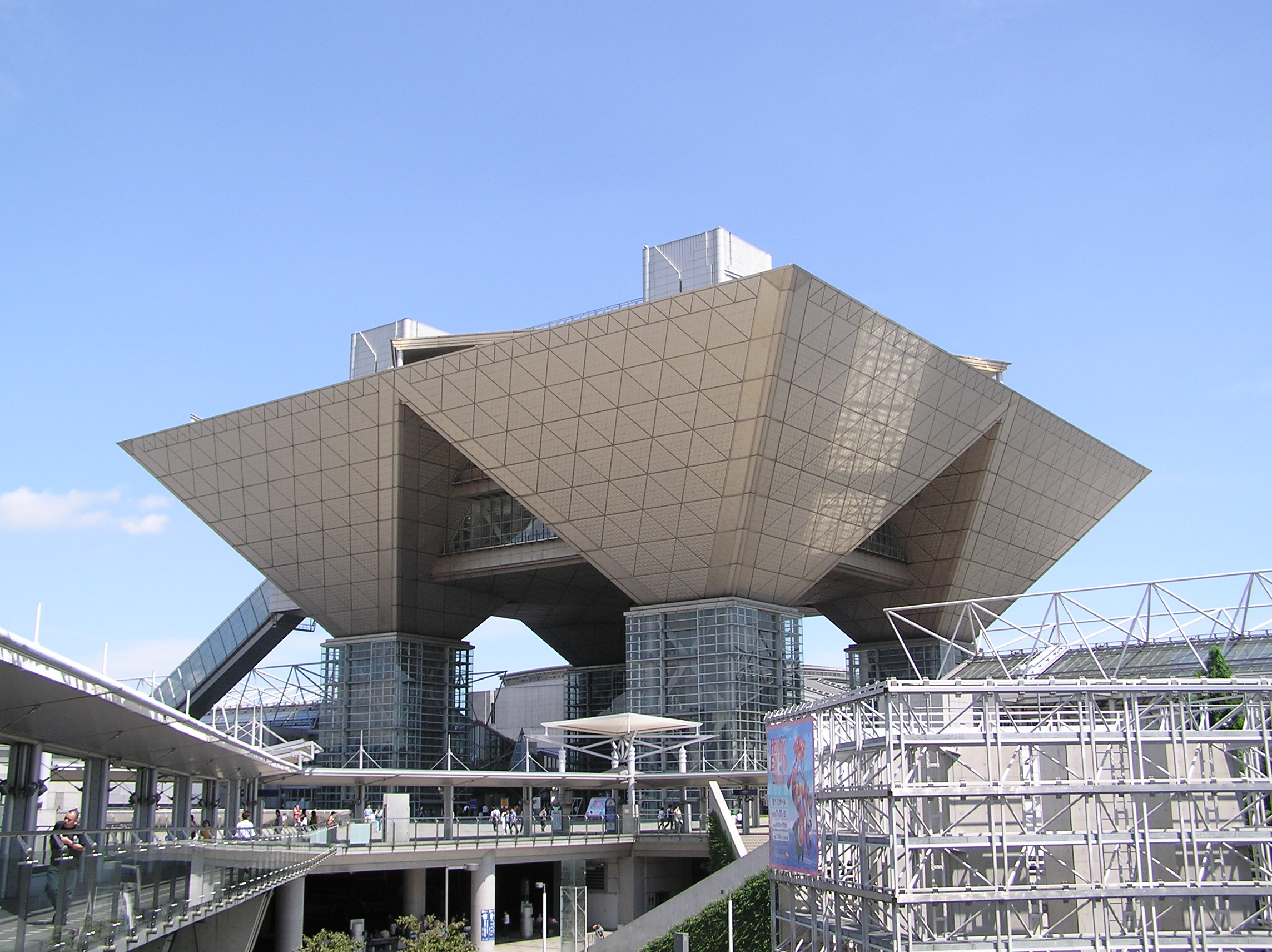
Tokyo Big Sight

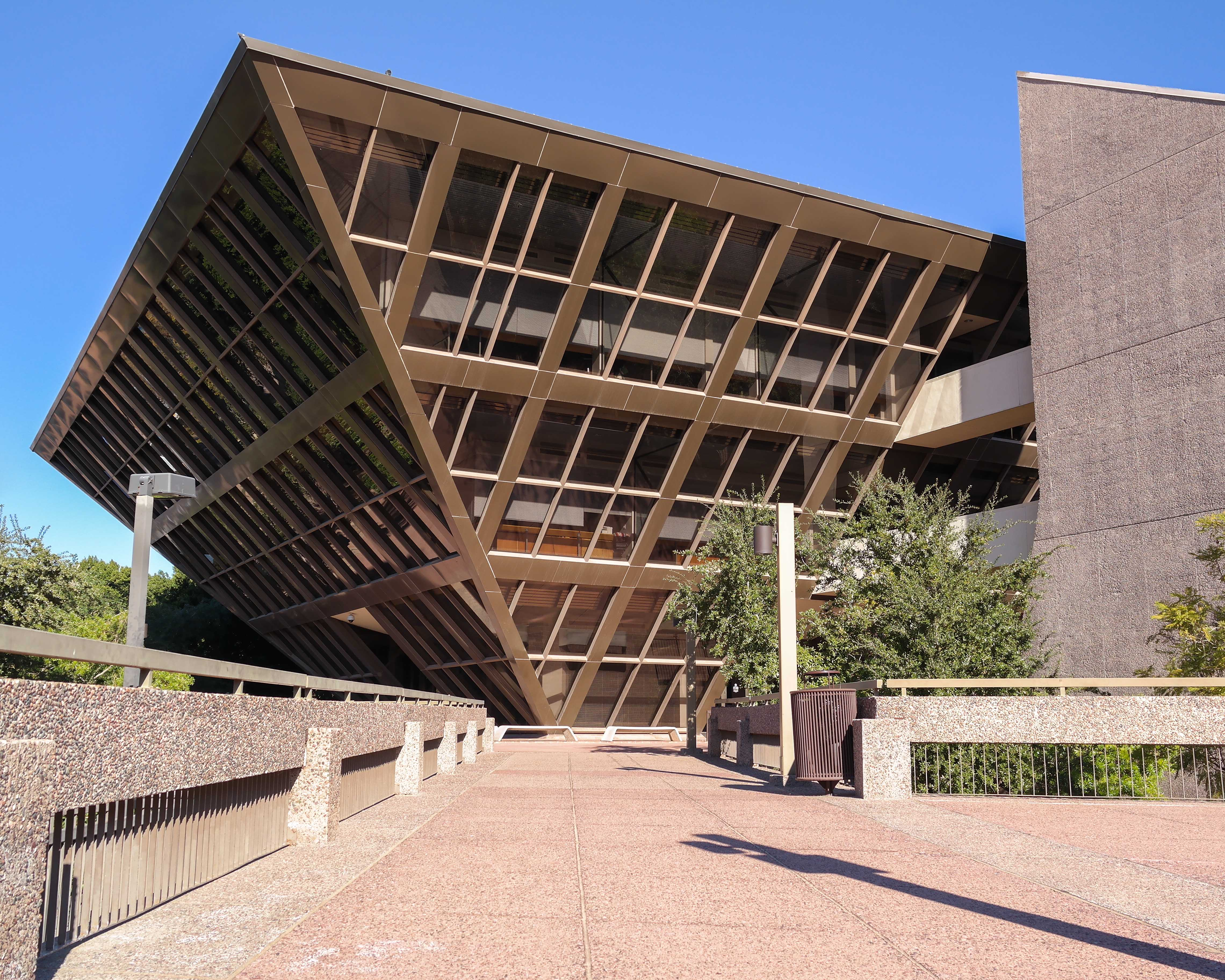
Tempe Municipal Building

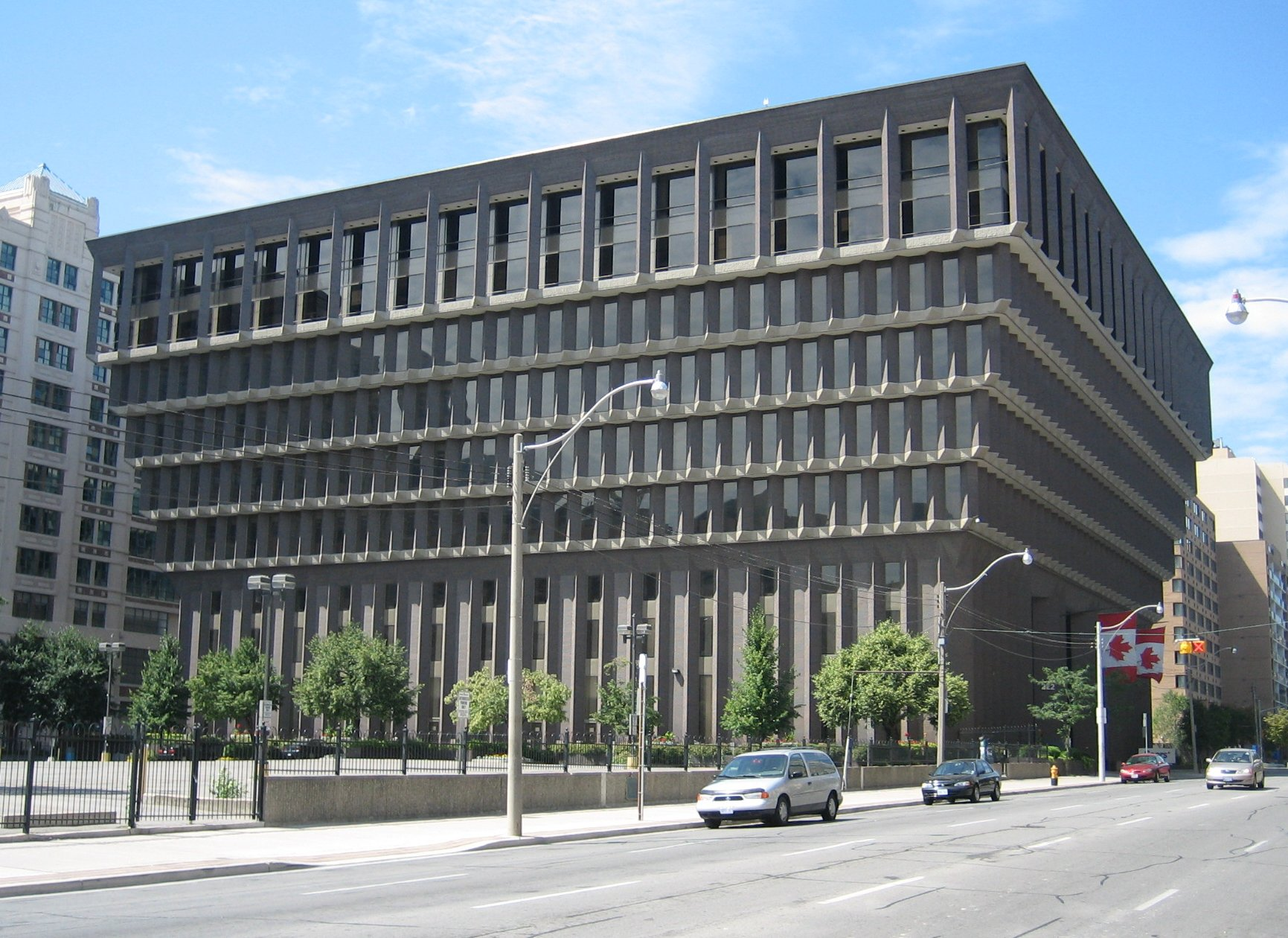
222 Jarvis Street, Toronto

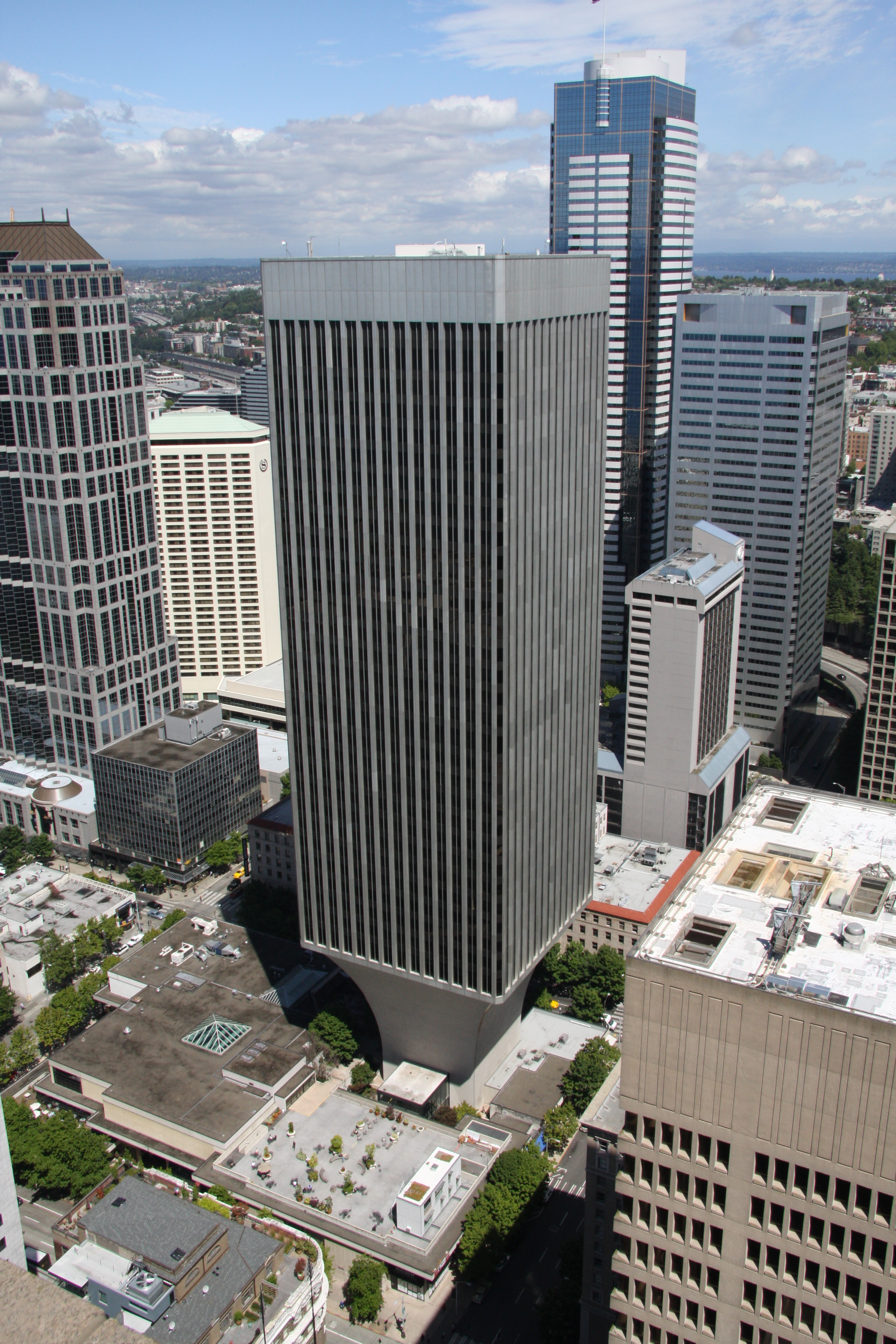
Rainier Tower, Seattle

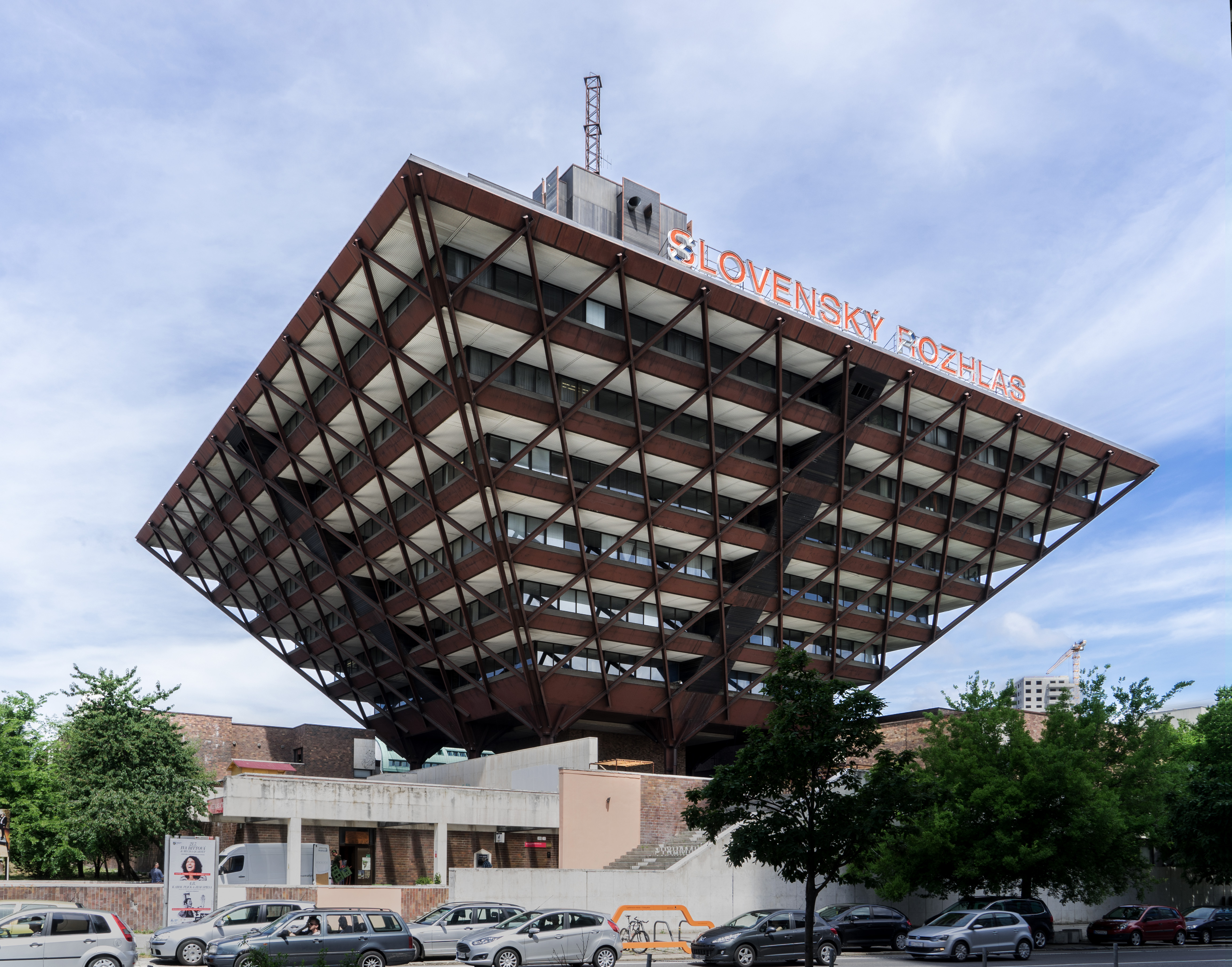
Slovak Radio Building, Bratislava

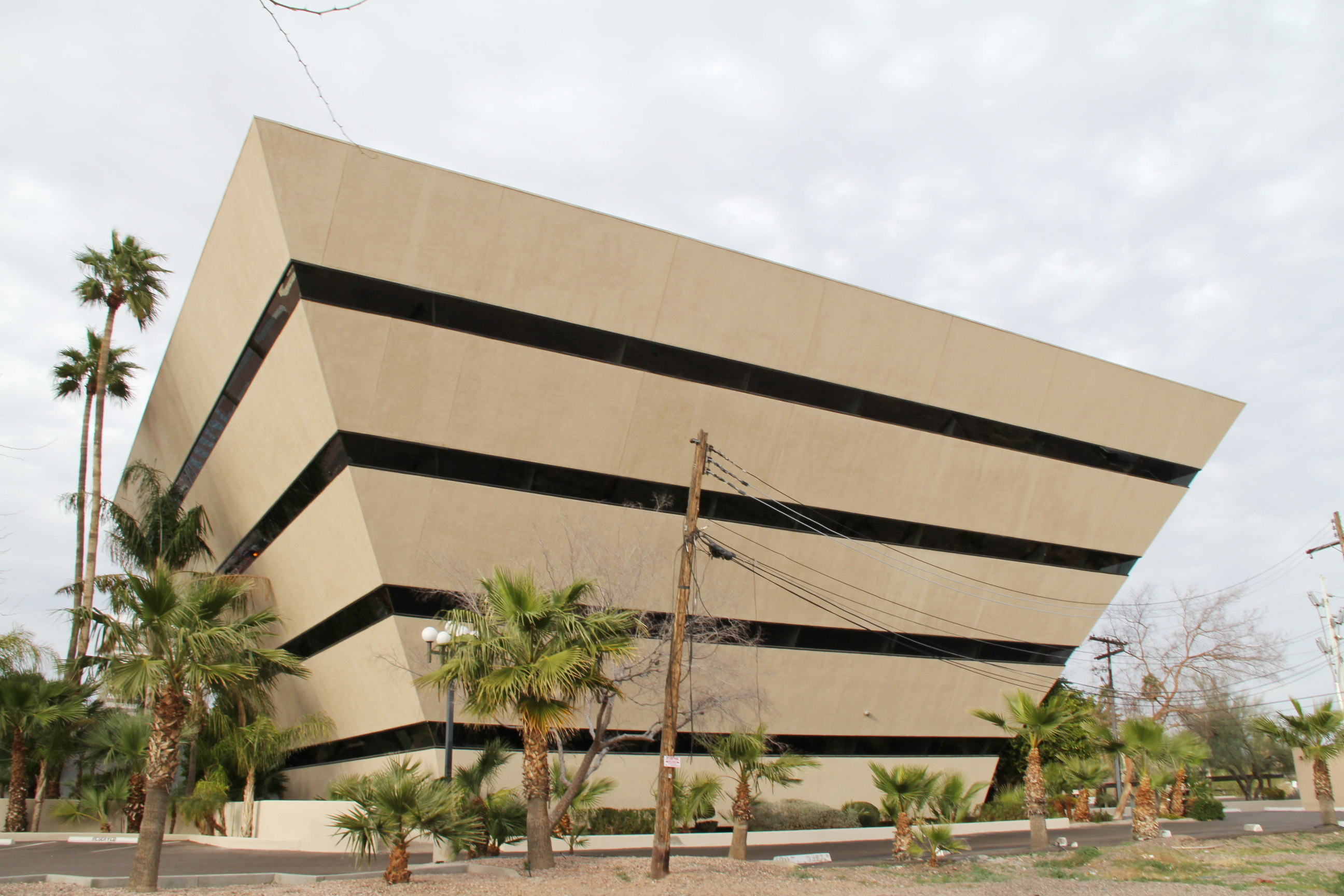
Pyramid on Central, Phoenix AZ

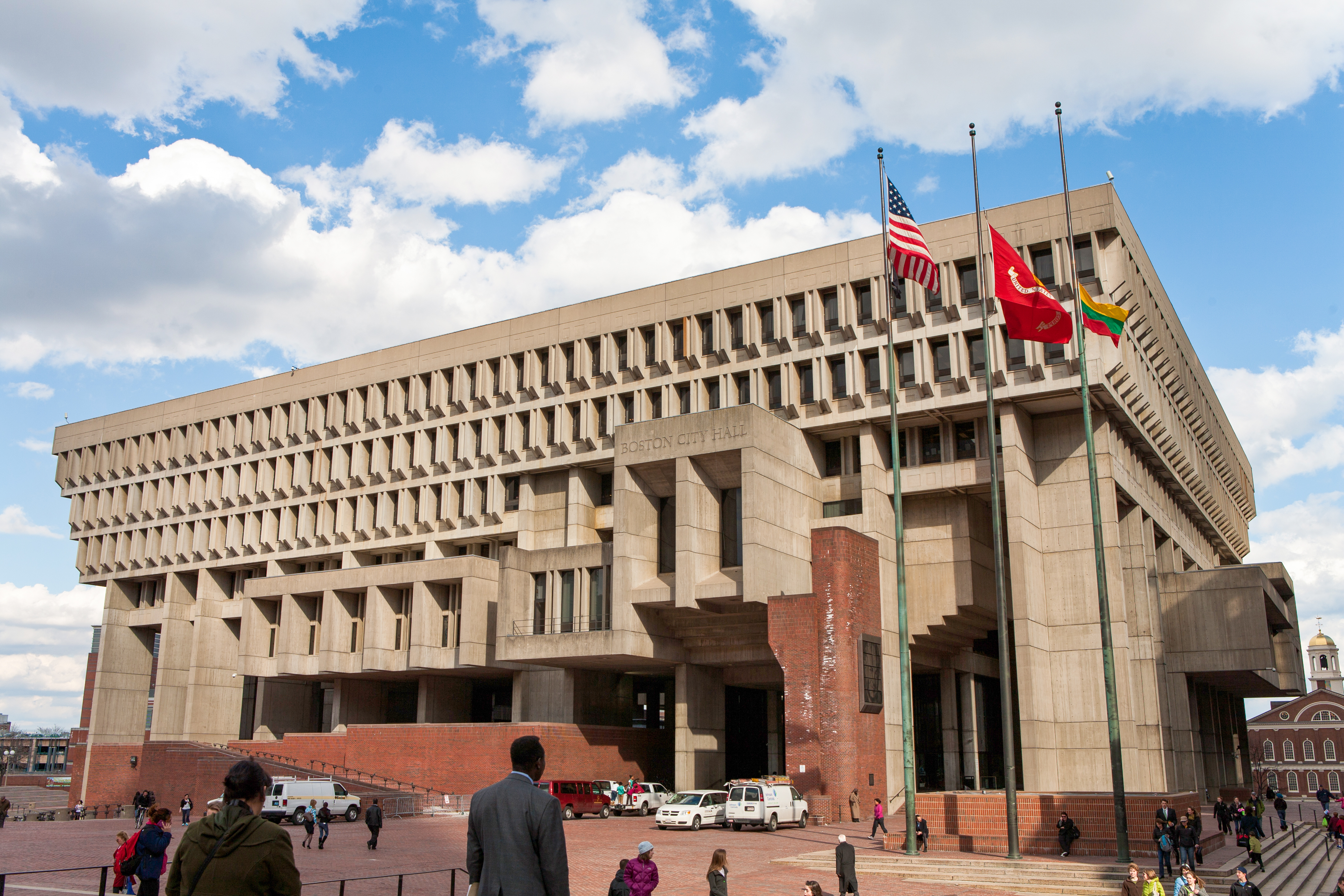
Boston City Hall

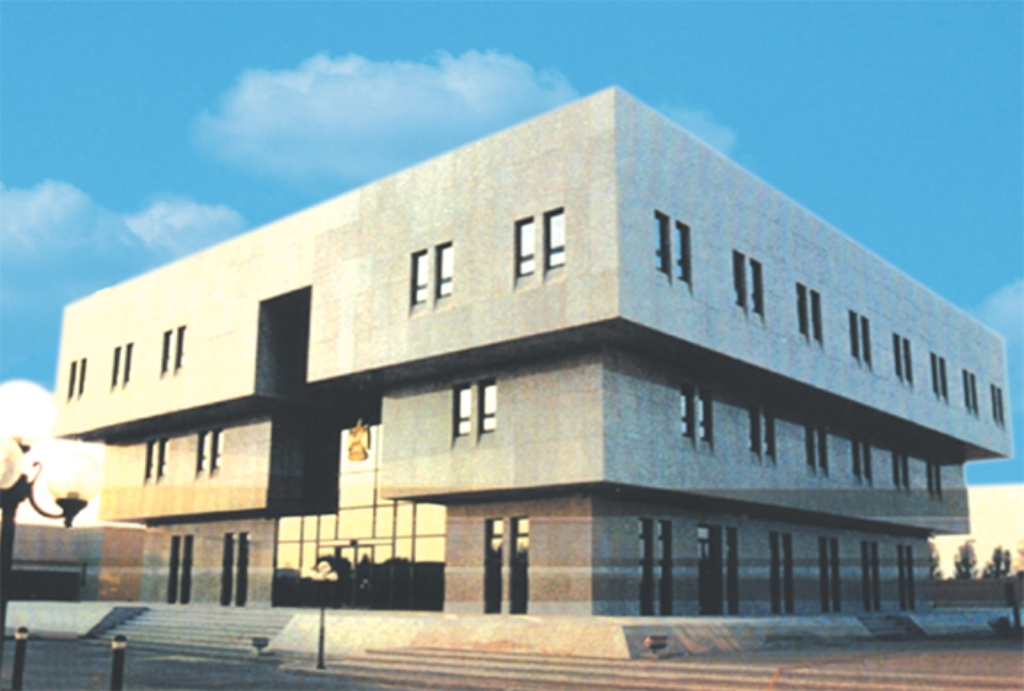
Egyptian embassy in Abu Dhabi, United Arab Emirates

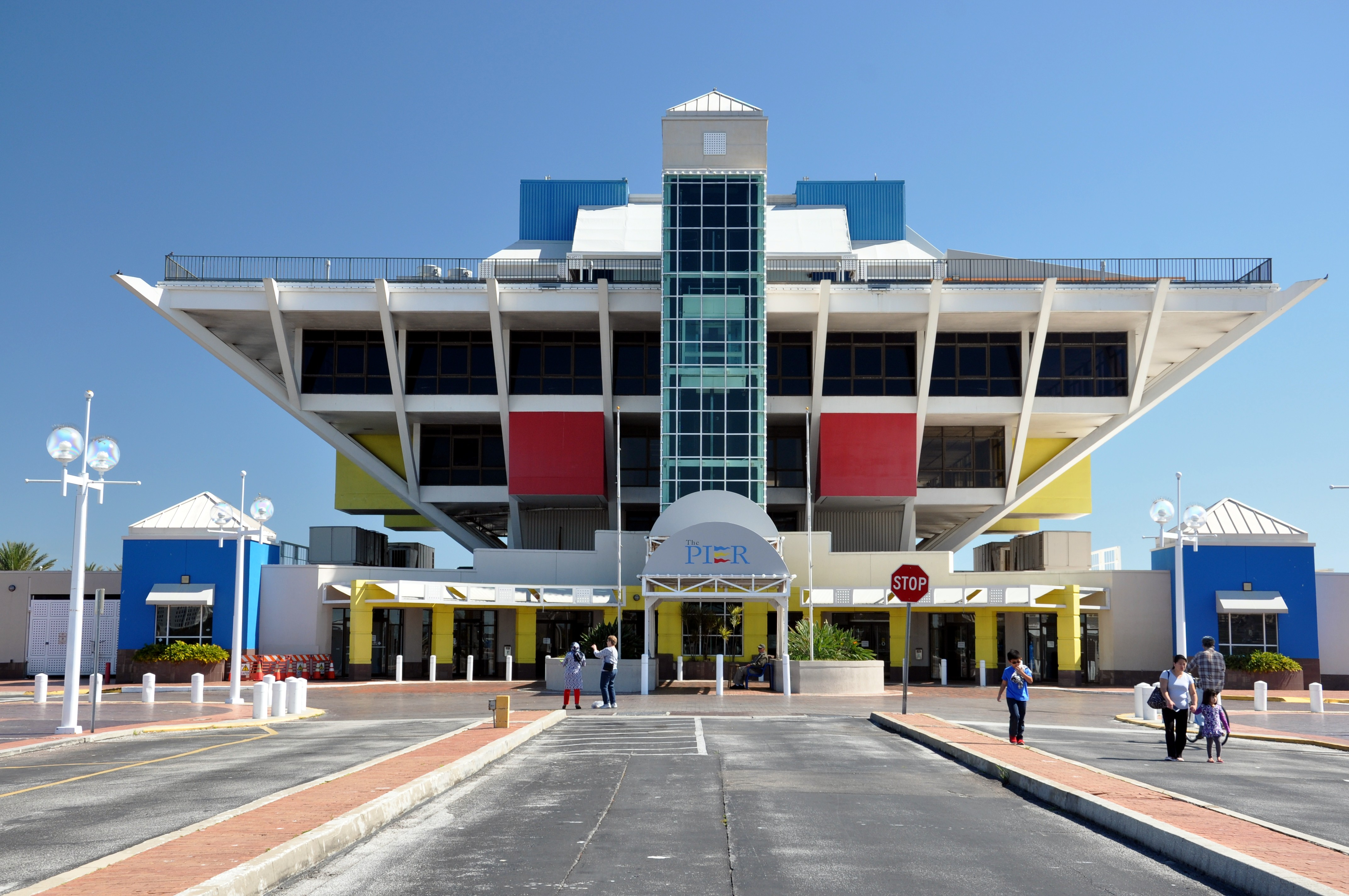
The Inverted Pyramid Pier, St Petersburg. Officially closed in May 2013 and later demolished
