= Le Collège français =

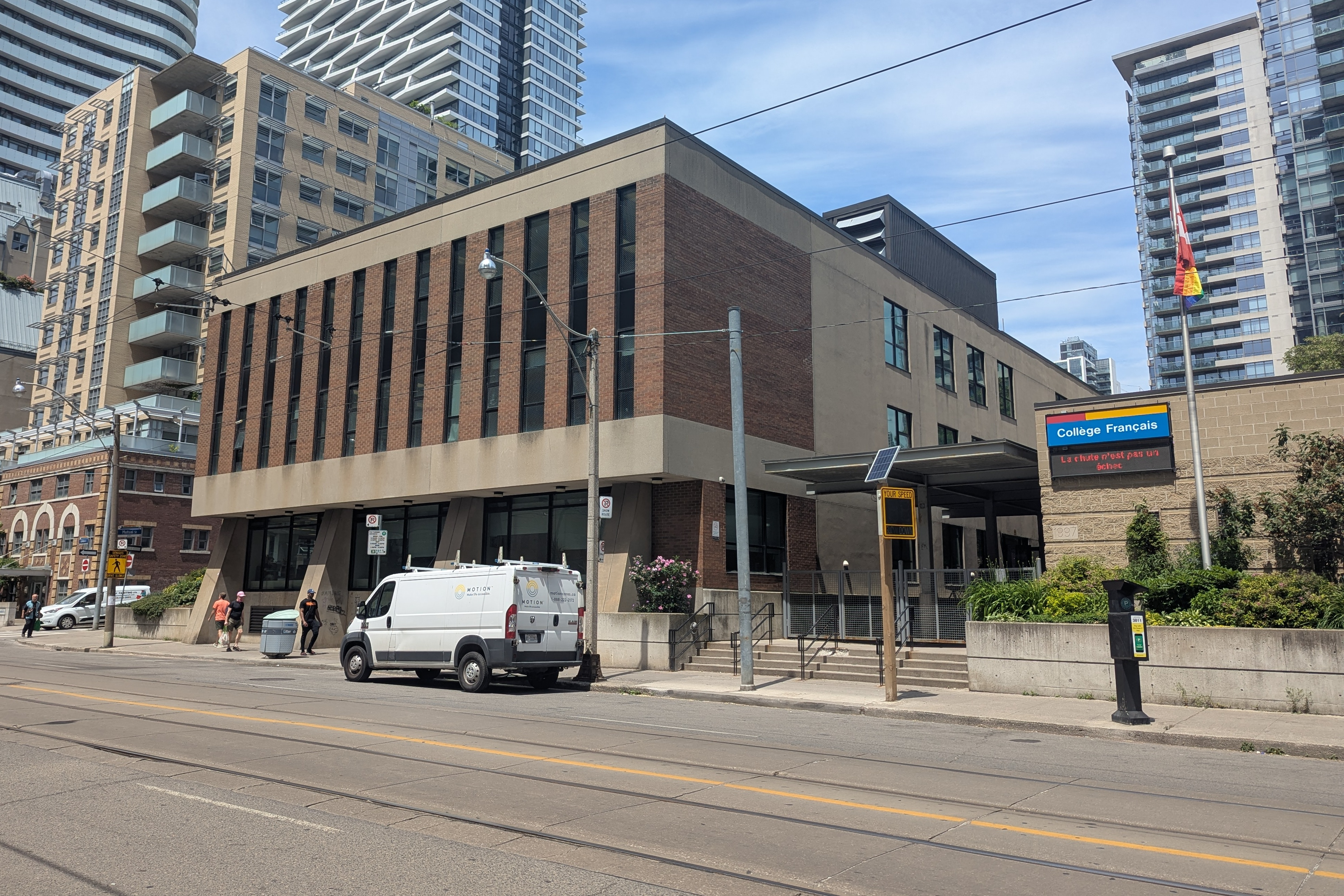
- Le Collège français in 2025

Location
- 100 Carlton Street; Toronto, Ontario, M5B 1M3; Canada; 43.6624°N 79.3779°W

Information
- School type: Public, high school
- Founded: 1979
- School board: Conseil scolaire Viamonde
- Area trustee: Chloë Robert
- School number: 918997
- Principal: Ravi Ramdhony
- Grades: 7–12
- Language: French
- Team name: Phénix (Phoenix)
- Public transit access: College TTC subway station
- Website: collegefrancais.csviamonde.ca

Le Collège français (LCF) is a French-language high school located within the Garden District in Toronto, Ontario, Canada part of the Conseil scolaire Viamonde. Prior to 1998, the school was part of the Conseil des écoles françaises de la communauté urbaine de Toronto (CEFCUT) and the Toronto Board of Education (TBE).

== General information ==
Le Collège français is part of le Conseil scolaire Viamonde and as of September 2009 had 283 students enrolled. It is located in downtown Toronto near the intersection of Carlton Street and Jarvis Street, near the TTC College subway station. Around 80% of the school's students commute by public transit. The school offers the IB program.

== History ==
Le Collège français was founded in 1979 within Monarch Park High School as the first French language "module" at the secondary level in Toronto. It was the second French public secondary school established in Toronto. (The first was École secondaire Étienne-Brûlé). In 1981, it moved to Jarvis Collegiate Institute, became a separate entity in 1989, and adopted the name Le Collège français à Jarvis in 1992. In September 1997, the school moved into its present building on Carlton Street at Jarvis Street, and became Le Collège français; the building previously had been part of the Canadian Broadcasting Corporation Toronto headquarters until they were moved to their current location at the Canadian Broadcasting Centre in 1993.

== Sports ==
Le Collège français has a basketball, volleyball, hockey and soccer team. The College Francais soccer team were TDCAA soccer 'A' champions in 2022–23 and 2023–24.

== Notable people of Le Collège français ==
=== Alumni ===
- Sam Earle – child actor
- Dalmar Abuzeid – child actor

== See also ==
- Education in Ontario
- List of secondary schools in Ontario
