= Conseil des écoles françaises de la communauté urbaine de Toronto =

School board in Ontario, Canada

Conseil des écoles françaises de la communauté urbaine de Toronto (Metropolitan Toronto French School Board)

Location
- 1 Concorde Gate; Don Mills, North York, Ontario M3C 3N6 Canada

District information
- Established: December 1, 1988
- Closed: December 31, 1997
- District ID: CÉFCUT

The Conseil des écoles françaises de la communauté urbaine de Toronto, commonly known as CÉFCUT (English: Metropolitan Toronto French School Board), is a former public secular French first language school district. The school board was established in 1988 to manage secular French first language schools in Metropolitan Toronto. It operated until 1998, when CÉFCUT was formally merged with other secular French school boards in the Ontario Peninsula, creating Conseil scolaire Viamonde.

Public separate French schools in Toronto were not managed by CÉFCUT, but Les Conseil des écoles catholiques du Grand Toronto, a board managed by the Metropolitan Separate School Board (MSSB). MSSB controlled the separate French school board until 1998, when the MSSB was reorganized, and its English and French components were split into separate school boards. Separate French first language schools in Toronto are presently managed by the Conseil scolaire catholique MonAvenir.

== History ==
Prior to the establishment of CÉFCUT, several English-language school boards in the Toronto area operated secular Francophone schools with a total of almost 1,700 students; they were the North York Board of Education, Scarborough Board of Education, and Toronto Board of Education. Seven Francophone schools existed in the Toronto area in 1980. The concept of CÉFCUT was developed by a committee assembled by Ontario Minister of Education Sean Conway. CÉFCUT was established on 1 December 1988, and it began operations in 1989.

In 1998, CÉFCUT was merged with several other secular French school boards in the Ontario Peninsula, forming Conseil scolaire Viamonde.

== List of schools ==
The following is a list of schools operated by the school board in 1998, prior to its amalgamation into Conseil scolaire Viamonde:

=== Elementary ===
- École élémentaire Félix-Leclerc – Etobicoke
- École élémentaire Jeanne-Lajoie – North York
- École élémentaire Laure-Rièse – Toronto (Note: Refers to the old City of Toronto, prior to its dissolution and amalgamation into the "new" City of Toronto in 1998.)
- École élémentaire Gabrielle-Roy – Toronto
- École élémentaire Mathieu-Da-Costa – North York

=== Secondary ===
- École secondaire Étienne-Brûlé – North York
- Le Collège français à Jarvis – Toronto

== See also ==
- Education in Toronto
- Franco-Ontarian
