= Merchandise Building =

Coordinates: 43.65782°N 79.37658°W

Robert Simpson Co. Limited Warehouse

General information
- Type: Commercial Warehouse
- Architectural style: Various, including International Style (1930 warehouse addition)
- Location: 155 Dalhousie St, formerly 108 Mutual St., Toronto, Ontario, Canada
- Construction started: 1910, with additions in 1916 and 1930
- Owner: Sears Canada until 1992

Height
- Roof: pyramidal metal roofs and a flat roof

Technical details
- Structural system: 1910 Warehouse: brick. 1916 Mail Order Building: red brick over reinforced concrete. 1930 Warehouse: Brick and Concrete
- Floor area: 7,500 square feet (700 m^{2}) (orig.); 2,500 square feet (230 m^{2}) (1851 addition)

Ontario Heritage Act
- Official name: Robert Simpson Co. Ltd. Warehouse
- Designated: May 12, 1997

References
- City of Toronto By-Law 218-97,

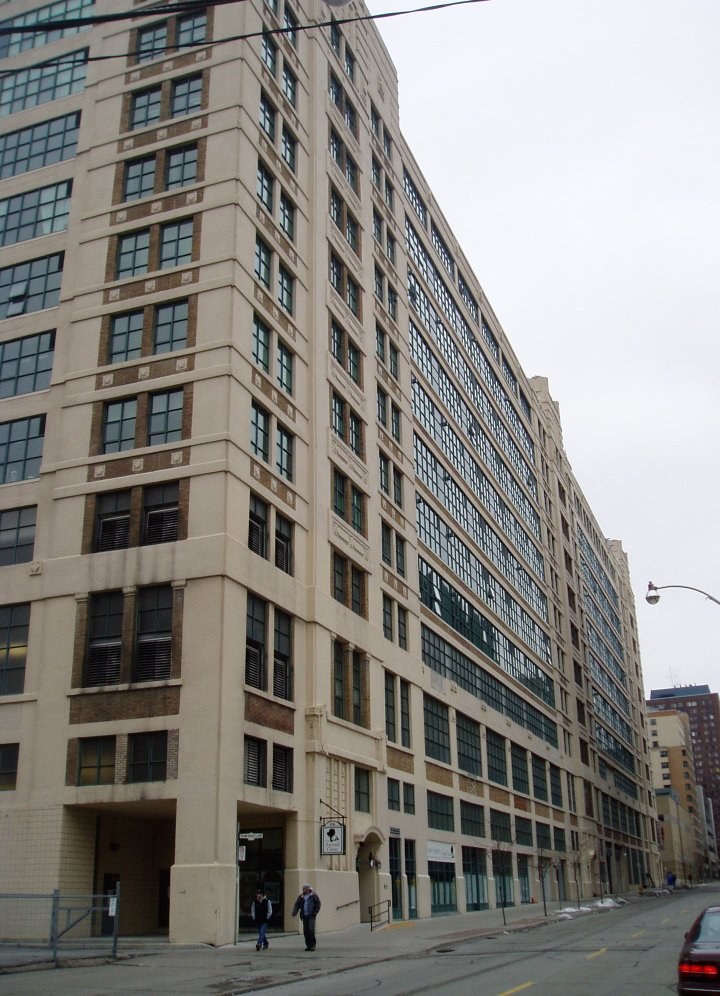
Southeast side of the Merchandise Building

The Merchandise Building is a loft conversion of a former warehouse located in downtown Toronto on Dalhousie Street, near the campus of Toronto Metropolitan University and the Toronto Eaton Centre. Built in various stages from 1910 to 1949 for the Simpson's department store, and later owned by Sears Canada after Simpson's demise, the Merchandise Building at over 1,000,000 square feet (93,000 m^{2}) is one of the largest buildings by floor area in downtown Toronto. It is an example of the early 20th-century industrial Chicago School architectural style.

== History ==
The oldest part of the site is a six-story manufactory built in 1910 on Dalhousie Street for Simpson's delivery business. Behind it on Mutual Street in 1914 the growing company added the "Robert Simpson Co Ltd Mail-Order Building", a large distribution warehouse. Further expansion occurred in the years 1931–1949, tripling the size of the building, yet still conforming to the original design. The building architect was Max Dunning of the firm of Burke, Horwood and White. This noted Canadian firm's other work in Toronto includes what is now the Bell Media building on Queen Street West and the Simpsons (now The Bay) flagship store at the corner of Queen Street and Yonge Street. Contrary to popular belief, Dunning and his firm were not responsible for the Tip Top Tailor building - although sharing many design aspects with the Merchandise Building, it was produced in the year 1929 by the firm of Bishop & Miller.

The Robert Simpson Co. Ltd. Mail-Order Building incorporated many features, that while commonplace today, were relatively novel at the time - a steel structure, reinforced, fire-proof concrete, well-positioned emergency stairwells, and large windows for natural light. The building's water needs were assisted by a 40,000 gallon rooftop water tower.

In 1953, Simpsons Limited (the holding company for The Robert Simpson Company Limited [or Simpson's]) joined forces with Sears, Roebuck and Co. of Chicago in forming a 50/50 ownership in a new company, Simpsons-Sears Limited. The new firm took control of Simpson's catalogue and mail-order business and would open new Sears-style department stores in markets not already served by Simpsons. It was seen as better suited to take on competition with the strong T. Eaton Co. catalogue business and to use Sears marketing principles to expand into smaller Canadian rural and suburban markets.

The Toronto Mail Order Building complex - which eventually came to be known by the less cumbersome name of "the Mutual Street Building", continued to serve the needs of Simpsons-Sears. In 1971, the complex was connected to the department store chain's new head office building at 222 Jarvis Street.

In January 1979, the venerable Hudson's Bay Company (HBC) bought Simpsons Limited in a hostile takeover, following a stalled (by the Foreign Investment Review Agency) and subsequently failed merger attempt between Simpsons and Simpsons-Sears. Simpsons-Sears continued to operate on its own, out from under its former parent, until 1984, when its name was changed to Sears Canada Inc. In 1991, HBC retired the Simpson's brand, either merging the remaining (Toronto-area) stores into the Bay banner or selling them off to Sears, depending on the location.

The Sears catalogue business continued after the Simpsons sale to HBC and Sears Canada continued to use the Mutual Street Building as a warehouse until the 1990s, before moving out and consolidating all its GTA catalogue operations at new distribution/warehouse logistics centres in Belleville and Vaughan, ON. Sears then sold the Mutual Street property for loft development.

At the same time the City of Toronto government had relaxed zoning restrictions in certain areas of the downtown core, allowing redevelopment of under-used or empty 19th and 20th century factories and warehouses. There was a plan to convert the warehouse into public housing, but the City in the end sold the property to Cresford Developments. The project was one of the earlier and by far the largest warehouse loft conversions in Toronto. The ambitious plan to completely modernize the building was delayed by a general construction strike and a spectacular three-alarm fire, started when a worker tossed a cigarette butt into one of the old freight elevator shafts, landing on a massive pile of debris dumped from all the floors to be cleared from the bottom. The huge pile burned for hours, but the building did not, testament to the original designer's intent in 1914 to create a structure as fire-proof as possible.

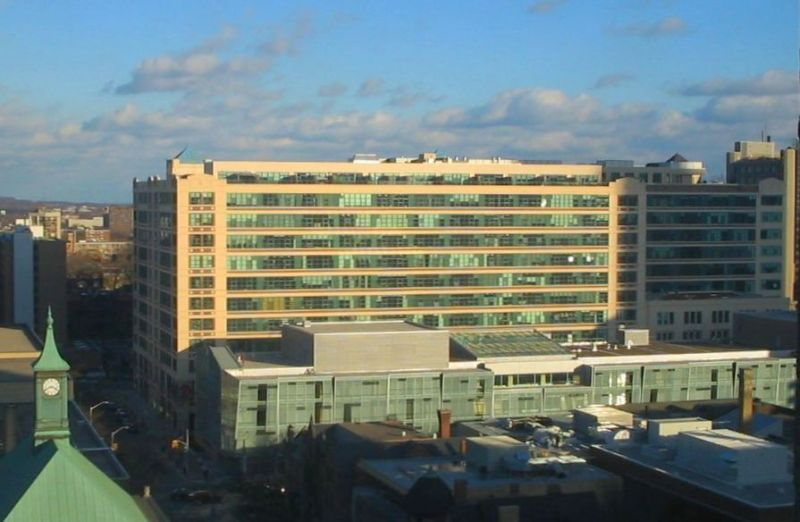
Merchandise Building at sunset, looking from Toronto Metropolitan University

Among the many modernizations is a green roof and coated windows to reduce energy loss. Other environmental upgrades include a "Tri-Sorter" recycling chute that accommodates 3 types of waste. The entire building is wired with fibre-optic cable, has a rooftop pool, patio, and dog-walking area, and all the usual amenities in a large condominium, plus some unusual ones including a four-storey interior lobby and indoor half-basketball court. The interior design team of Simone-Ciccone and the award-winning designer Brian Gluckstein produced between them nine different primary suite layouts with over sixty variations. Interior features include 8-foot (2.4 m) sliding barn doors, 12-foot (3.7 m) ceilings with exposed duct work and support pillars with capitals, and 10-foot (3.0 m) windows. The ground floor of the building is retail, anchored by a supermarket.

When it was finally completed in the late 1990s, the project garnered several awards including a commendation from Heritage Toronto and awards from the Greater Toronto Home Builders Association. The conversion pleased the architecture writer for the Toronto Star, Christopher Hume, who gave the project an "A". The Merchandise Building was one of the first large redevelopment projects east of Yonge Street. Other projects in the area include the conversion of the Toronto RCMP Building into a luxury hotel, the old CBC building on Jarvis Street into condominiums, the new headquarters of the National Ballet School, and the conversion of Maple Leaf Gardens into a Loblaws supermarket and Toronto Metropolitan University athletic centre.
