= List of people from Newport Beach, California =

This is a list of notable residents of Newport Beach, California.

== Arts ==
- Rikk Agnew, guitarist, vocalist of Social Distortion, Adolescents, Christian Death, and D.I.
- Howard Alden, jazz guitarist
- Steve Aoki, producer and DJ
- Lauren Bacall, actress
- Lewis Baltz, photographer
- Richard L. Bare, television director
- Drake Bell, singer-songwriter, actor, musician and voice actor
- Joey Bishop, entertainer
- Humphrey Bogart, actor, yachtsman
- George Burns, entertainer
- Nicolas Cage, actor
- Jeanne Cagney, actress
- William Cagney, producer
- Dick Dale, musician, "King of the Surf Guitar"
- JoAnn Dean Killingsworth, actress and dancer, first person to play Snow White at Disneyland
- Dolores del Río, actress
- David Denman, actor
- Buddy Ebsen, actor
- Stan Frazier, musician, record producer, restaurateur
- Gunnar Gehl, singer-songwriter
- Leo Howard, actor
- Jeremy Jackson, actor
- Chuck Jones, cartoon artist, animator of Bugs Bunny and Daffy Duck
- Heather Paige Kent (now Heather DuBrow), actress and reality TV star
- Dean Koontz, writer
- Brent Kutzle, musician and record producer, bassist and cellist for OneRepublic
- Heather Locklear, actress
- Lee Mallory, poet, retired professor
- Leslie Mann, actress
- McG, film and television director and producer
- Kelly McGillis, actress
- Ted McGinley, actor
- Mark McGrath, singer, Sugar Ray
- Mike Ness, musician and songwriter of Social Distortion
- Helena Modjeska, actress
- Anton Newcombe, guitarist, vocalist and founder of The Brian Jonestown Massacre
- Pedro Pascal, actor
- Cathy Rigby, gymnast and actress
- Ruen, DJ and producer
- Michael Steele (The Runaways, Elton Duck, The Bangles, Crash Wisdom)
- Gwen Stefani, singer, No Doubt
- Emma Stone, actress
- Shirley Temple, actress
- Dr. John Townsend, award-winning author
- Thalia Tran, actress
- Elise Trouw, musician
- Lisa Tucker, singer and actor
- Tom Tully, actor, The Lineup (1954–1960 CBS television series)
- Mamie Van Doren, actress and sex symbol
- Talon Warburton, actor and voice actor
- John Wayne, actor and icon

== Business ==
- George Argyros, real estate investor, former owner of Seattle Mariners
- Brian Niccol, current CEO of Starbucks, former CEO of Chipotle Mexican Grill and Taco Bell
- Donald Bren, owner of Irvine Company
- William H. Gross, co-founder of Pimco
- John H. Meier, former business adviser to Howard Hughes
- Michael Morhaime, co-founder and chief executive of Blizzard Entertainment
- Randall Presley, real estate developer
- Gary Primm, casino developer and former chairman, chief executive of Primm Valley Resorts and Primadonna Resorts Inc.
- Richard Roberts, chairman and chief executive officer of the Oral Roberts Evangelistic Association
- Henry Samueli, co-founder of Broadcom Corporation and owner of NHL's Anaheim Ducks

== Sports ==
- Geoff Abrams, tennis player
- Nolan Arenado, MLB third baseman, St. Louis Cardinals
- Panos Armenakas, soccer player
- Carsten Ball, Australian tennis player
- Matt Barkley, NFL quarterback, first freshman to start at that position for USC
- Amanda Beard, swimmer and Olympic medalist
- Steve Birnbaum, soccer player
- Scott Boras, baseball player agent
- Francois Botha, heavyweight boxer
- Kobe Bryant, NBA player
- Kevin Buckler, race car driver & founder of The Racers Group
- Bryan Burke, soccer player
- Dane Cameron, race car driver
- Sasha Cohen, figure skater
- Gerrit Cole, MLB player, New York Yankees
- Richie Collins, surfer
- Fred Couples, golfer
- Noah Davis (nicknamed Diesel; born 1997), MLB baseball pitcher, Colorado Rockies
- Taylor Dent, tennis player
- Roy Emerson, retired Australian tennis player
- Ekaterina Gordeeva, figure skater
- Betty Ann Grubb Stuart, tennis player
- Brett Hansen-Dent, tennis player
- Keith Hartwig, NFL player, Green Bay Packers
- Kyle Hendricks, pitcher for the Chicago Cubs
- Dwight Howard, NBA player, Houston Rockets
- Reggie Jackson, Hall of Fame baseball player, lived in Newport Beach
- Jürgen Klinsmann, German football manager and former football player
- Kevin Kouzmanoff, MLB player, San Diego Padres
- Jillian Kraus (born 1986), water polo player
- Ilia Kulik, figure skater
- Joffery Lupul, NHL player, Toronto Maple Leafs
- Bill Macatee, sportscaster
- Karl Malone, retired NBA player
- Todd Marinovich, quarterback for USC and Oakland Raiders
- Noelle Maritz, soccer player for Arsenal and Switzerland
- McKayla Maroney, retired Olympic gymnast
- Scott Niedermayer, retired NHL player
- Shohei Ohtani, baseball player
- Dennis Rodman, retired NBA player
- DJ Rodman, NBA G League player for Greensboro Swarm
- Trinity Rodman, soccer player for Washington Spirit and the United States
- Josh Samuels (born 1991), Olympic water polo player
- Jerry Simon (born 1968), American-Israeli basketball player
- Leigh Steinberg, noted sports agent, said to be the model for the title character of Jerry Maguire
- Allison Stokke, pole vaulter, model
- Robert "Wingnut" Weaver, surfer
- John Welbourn, NFL player, New England Patriots
- C.J. Wilson, MLB starting pitcher for Los Angeles Angels of Anaheim
- George Yardley, NBA player in Basketball Hall of Fame
- Jason Zucker, NHL hockey player

== Military ==
- Curtis LeMay, Chief of Staff of the United States Air Force.

== Other ==
- Michael Franzese, former mobster and caporegime in the New York-based Colombo crime family; was known as the "yuppie don" and is now a motivational speaker and writer
- Dana Sue Gray, convicted serial killer
- Mary Kay Letourneau, Washington sex offender and teacher; basis for 2023 drama May December
