= House of the Future =

Modernist house in Arizona

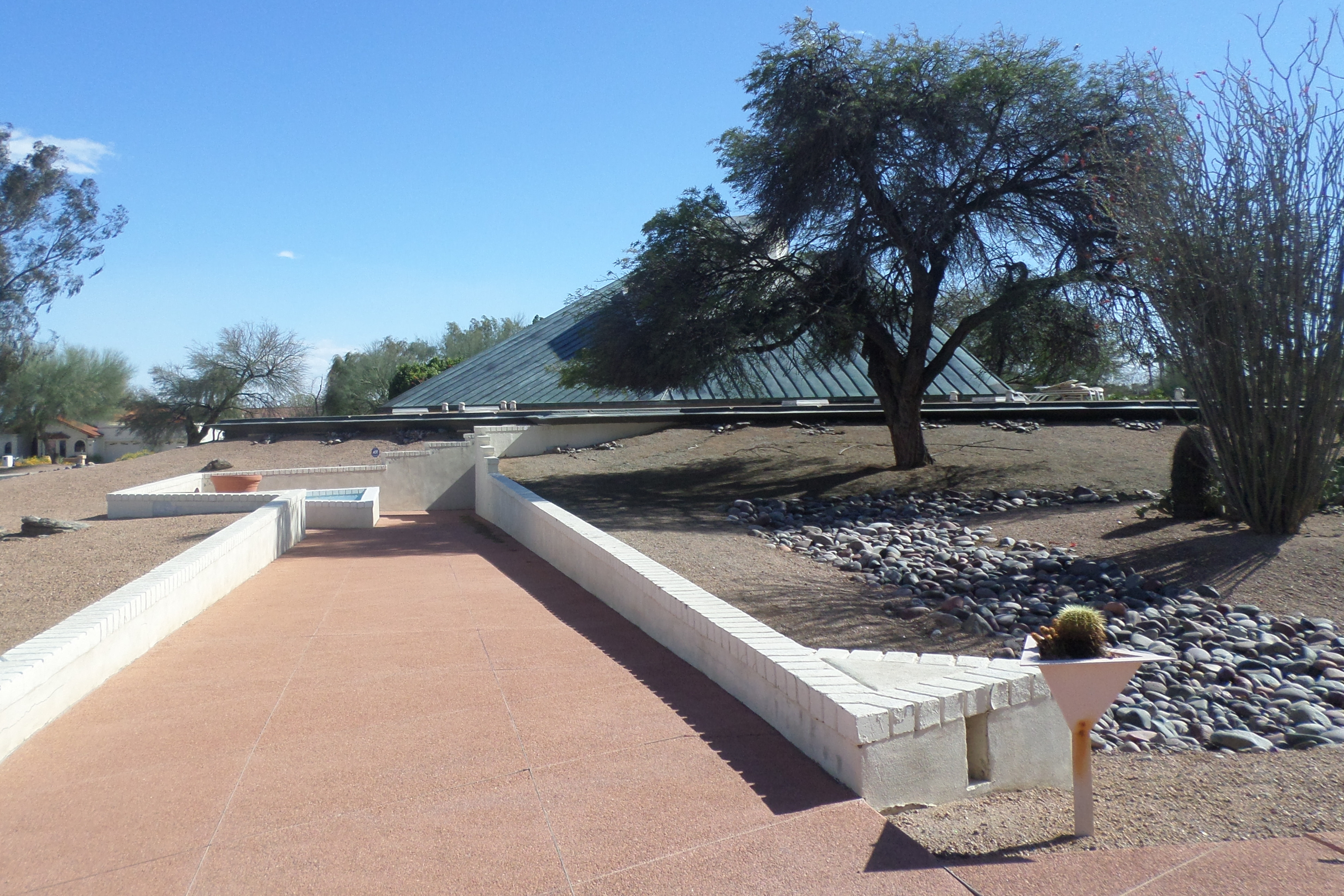
- House of the Future in 2019
- Interactive map of the House of the Future area

General information
- Architectural style: Organic Architecture
- Location: Ahwatukee, Phoenix, Arizona, United States, 3713 E Equestrian Trail, Phoenix, Arizona
- Coordinates: 33.3353°N 112.0036°W
- Groundbreaking: 1979
- Completed: 1980
- Opened: February 1980
- Cost: $1,200,000

Technical details
- Floor area: 3,100 square feet (290 m^{2})

Design and construction
- Architect: Charles R. Schiffner
- Architecture firm: Taliesin Associated Architects
- Other designers: Frank Lloyd Wright Foundation, Motorola
- Main contractor: W. M. Grace Construction

The House of the Future (also known as the Ahwatukee House of the Future) is a home of the future in Ahwatukee, an urban village in Phoenix, Arizona. The idea was originated by Randall Presley, the developer of Ahwatukee to promote his then-new development and bring more residences to the then-less populated Ahwatukee neighborhood. The House was designed by Charles R. Schiffner Taliesin Associated Architects of the Frank Lloyd Wright Foundation in Scottsdale, who got inspiration from his drawings of one of his box projects originally intended for Frank Lloyd Wright and Olgivanna Lloyd Wright. It was opened for tours in 1980; tours cost $3. Between 1980 and 1984 the House attracted approximately 250,000 people, who were also given tours of various model homes in the development. After four years the House was sold, and is now in private ownership, having changed hands several times.

The House was "the first microprocessor controlled house". Designed in coordination with Motorola it had multiple Motorola MC6800 microprocessors that "opened and closed windows, adjusted blinds, and stored tax records, shopping lists, and video games." The system consisted of ten microprocessors, and cost $30,000 in 1980 dollars.

The three-bedroom house had an unconventional design. "Most of it is below ground. It includes a two-storey 'atrium', or sky-lobby, from which all the rooms lead off. This contains plants and provides a central conversation area." "Dozens of companies helped build the property at an estimated cost of more than $2 million, a portion of it in donated materials."

When it opened the house became a media sensation. “It was covered in periodicals, the media of the time, in 33 different countries. It became a world-famous house, in essence.”
