= Gray Lyda =

American comic book artist and writer (1954–2015)

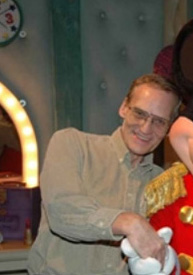
- Gray Lyda, December 2009
- Born: Grady Luther Lyda III; July 17, 1954 Dayton, Ohio
- Died: December 14, 2015 (aged 61) Corona, California
- Areas: Comic book artist and writer, Illustrator, Graphic designer
- Notable works: Tempus Fugitives, The Graphic Novel

Grady (Gray) Lyda (July 17, 1954 - December 14, 2015) was an American comic book artist and writer best known for his time travel series, Tempus Fugit, in Star*Reach magazine.

== Biography ==
Born in Dayton, Ohio, Grady Lyda's family moved to San Diego while he was still an infant. They later moved to Newport Beach, California, where Grady attended Newport Harbor High School. His first professional illustration was published in the April 1975 issue of Galaxy Magazine, and his first comic book story, Out of Space - Out of Time, appeared in Star*Reach issue # 6 (October 1976). This was followed by his Tempus Fugit series in Star*Reach issues 11, 13, 14, and 15.

During and after the publication of these stories, Lyda continued as a freelance artist for various companies. From 1978 to 1981, he worked for Hi-Point Enterprises/Spirit Accessories, a fashion accessory wholesaler in Hollywood, producing advertising, illustrations, catalogs and logos. The president of this company, Jerry Hasson, went on to create the Magic Pizza Family Entertainment Center on Sepulveda Boulevard in Manhattan Beach, California, a novelty restaurant with a fantasy/magic-themed environment. From 1982 to 1984, Lyda served as principal artist for Magic Pizza during the development and construction of the restaurant, designing its business identity as well as advertisements, brochures, business cards, logos, interior signage and posters.

Lyda also became a technical illustrator and graphic designer in the Defense/Aerospace industry. In 1978, he joined Mercury Consolidated, Inc., a busy job shop in Tustin, California, where he became an Art Department Supervisor and was granted a Secret Clearance in 1979. There, he made pick-ups and bids for out-sourced graphic-design jobs from prime contractors such as McDonnell Douglas, Lockheed, Hughes Aircraft, Rockwell International, and the Jet Propulsion Laboratory.

In 1993, Lyda was hired by the Rockwell International Autonetics Electronic Systems Division in Anaheim where he worked in the Central Graphics Department generating manuals, proposals, ads, posters, schematics, vugraphs, slides, and government proposals. He was laid-off prior to the company's acquisition by Boeing in 1996.

He went on to work in the Creative Services Department of semiconductor manufacturer Conexant Systems Inc., formerly Rockwell Semiconductor Systems. Later, he was employed by Conexant's spin-off, Jazz Semiconductor (now TowerJazz), a wafer foundry in Newport Beach. Beginning in July 2009, he also worked as a Cast Member at the Disneyland Resort in Anaheim.

== Bibliography ==
Comics work includes:

- Out of Space - Out of Time (8 pages) Star*Reach # 6 (October 1976)
- Out One Era & In the Other (8 pages) Star*Reach # 11 (December 1977)
- Second Venture (8 pages) Star*Reach # 13 (August 1978)
- Genesis Revisited - Part One (8 pages) Star*Reach # 13 (August 1978)
- Genesis Revisited - Part Two (16 pages) Star*Reach # 14 (August 1978)
- Tempus Fugitives (16 pages) Star*Reach # 15 (December 1978)
