= Gerrit Cole =

American baseball player (born 1990)

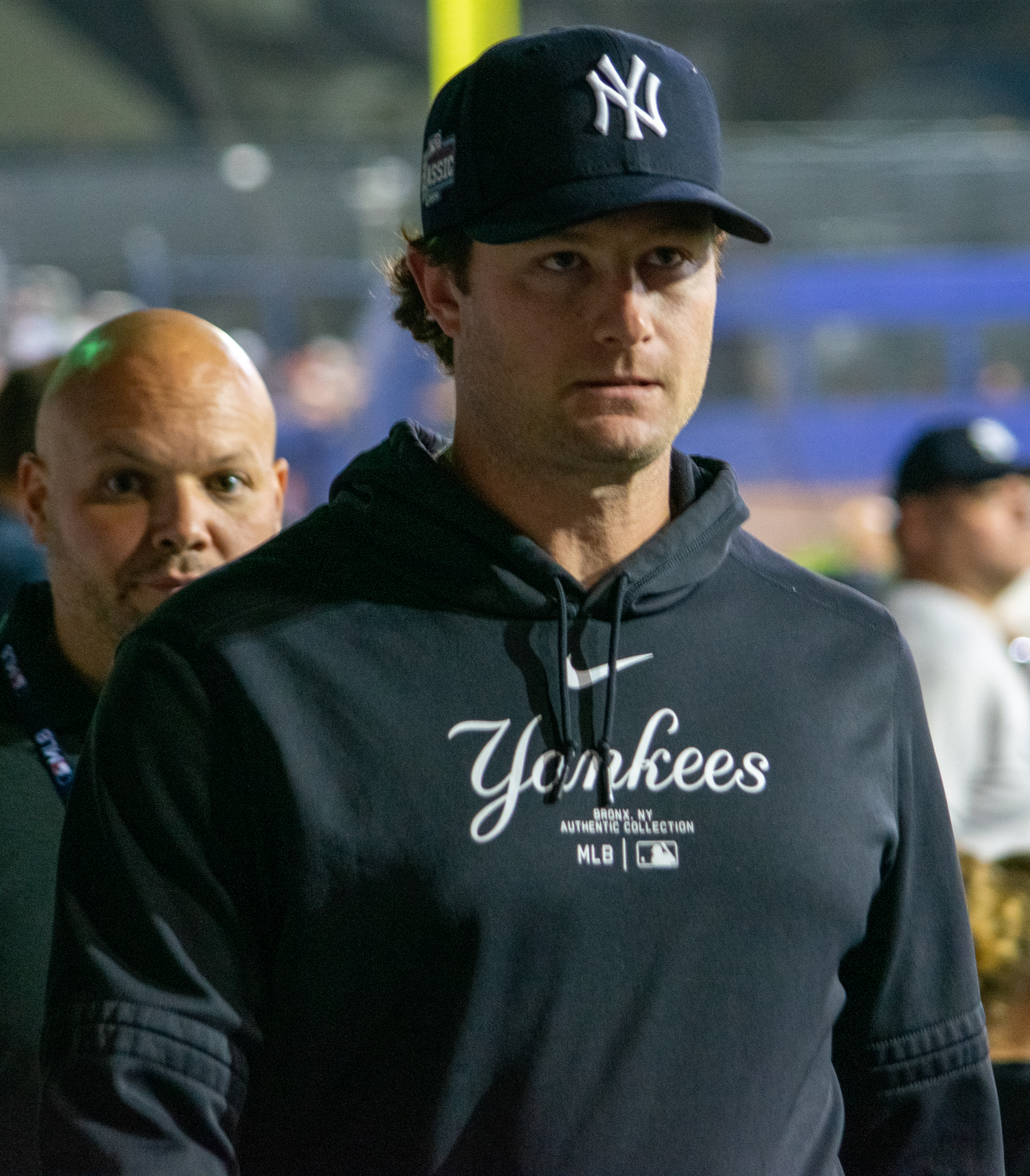
- Cole with the New York Yankees in 2024

New York Yankees – No. 45
- Pitcher
- Born: September 8, 1990 (age 36); Tustin, California, U.S.
- Bats: Right Throws: Right

MLB debut
- June 11, 2013, for the Pittsburgh Pirates

MLB statistics (through 2026 season)
- Win–loss record: 163–89
- Earned run average: 3.20
- Strikeouts: 2,382
- Stats at Baseball Reference

Teams
- Pittsburgh Pirates (2013–2017); Houston Astros (2018–2019); New York Yankees (2020–2024, 2026–present)

Career highlights and awards
- 6× All-Star (2015, 2018, 2019, 2021–2023); AL Cy Young Award (2023); 3× All-MLB First Team (2019, 2021, 2023); AL wins leader (2021); 2× AL ERA leader (2019, 2023); 2× MLB strikeout leader (2019, 2022)

Gerrit Alan Cole (born September 8, 1990) is an American professional baseball pitcher for the New York Yankees of Major League Baseball (MLB). He has previously played in MLB for the Pittsburgh Pirates and Houston Astros. Cole played for the baseball team at Orange Lutheran High School and was selected by the Yankees in the first round of the 2008 MLB draft. Cole opted not to sign and instead attended the University of California, Los Angeles (UCLA), where he played college baseball for the UCLA Bruins.

After his college baseball career, the Pirates made Cole the first overall selection in the 2011 MLB draft. He made his MLB debut in 2013 and was named the National League (NL) Rookie of the Month in September 2013. He was named the NL Pitcher of the Month for April 2015, and an MLB All-Star in 2015. The Pirates traded Cole to the Astros in the 2017–18 offseason. On September 18, 2019, Cole became the 18th pitcher in major league history to strike out at least 300 batters in a season. On December 16, 2019, the Yankees signed Cole to a franchise record nine-year, $324 million contract, the largest contract total in major league history for a pitcher.

Cole is a member of the 2022 class of the UCLA Athletics Hall of Fame. He also is the franchise record-holder for strikeouts in a single season for both the Astros (326 strikeouts in 2019) and the Yankees (257 strikeouts in 2022). Cole won the 2023 American League (AL) Cy Young Award via unanimous vote.

== Early life ==
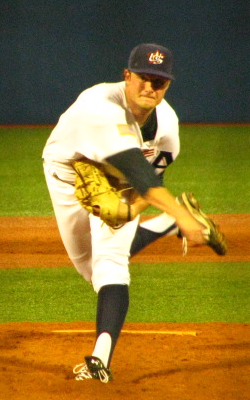
Cole pitching for the US national baseball team

Cole attended Orange Lutheran High School in Orange, California. In his sophomore year, Cole pitched for the school's junior varsity baseball team, allowing no runs in 45 innings pitched. He gained national attention while pitching for the varsity team in his junior year, as his fastball reached 94 miles per hour (151 km/h). He reached 96 miles per hour (154 km/h) in a showcase for the best prep school talents, and close to 50 scouts attended the first game of his senior season. In his senior year, Cole pitched to an 8–2 win–loss record and a 0.47 earned run average (ERA), while also recording 121 strikeouts in 75 innings.

In 2008, USA Today named Cole to their All-USA high school baseball team. Baseball America rated him the 17th-best prospect available in the 2008 Major League Baseball draft. He was named the starting pitcher of the 2008 Orange County North-South All-Star Game.

After his senior year, the New York Yankees selected Cole in the first round, with the 28th overall selection, of the 2008 Major League Baseball draft, becoming the first player ever drafted out of Orange Lutheran High School. The Yankees were reportedly planning on offering Cole a $4 million signing bonus, which was above the recommended amount for the slot. As the Yankees planned to give Cole a large bonus to sign, they waited until the deadline to attempt to sign him. By the time the deadline approached, Cole and his family had considered many variables, comparing players who sign out of high school to those who go to college, and decided to follow through with his commitment to attend the University of California, Los Angeles (UCLA) on a college baseball scholarship. Despite being represented by Scott Boras, and though the Yankees were believed to be ready to offer upwards of $4 million, Cole never negotiated with the Yankees, as he was determined to attend college. He majored in political science with a minor in theater at UCLA and had serious thought of pursuing an acting career had he not become a professional baseball player.

== College career ==
John Savage, coach of the UCLA Bruins, made Cole the team's Friday night starting pitcher in his freshman year. That season, Cole recorded a 4–8 win-loss record with a 3.49 ERA, collecting 104 strikeouts in 85 innings. Cole was a member of the 2009 United States collegiate national baseball team and was named to the 2010 Collegiate National Team roster. He competed in the 2010 World University Baseball Championship.

During UCLA's 2010 season, Cole and Trevor Bauer contributed in making the Bruins the best baseball team (51–17 record) in school history and the second-best team in the country. Cole had an 11–4 win–loss record, a 3.37 ERA, and 153 strikeouts in 123 innings. His 153 strikeouts placed Cole third among collegiate pitchers. The Bruins went on to play in the 2010 College World Series, but were defeated by South Carolina in the NCAA Championship Series.

Cole's statistics declined in 2011, his junior year. He finished the season with a 6–8 win-loss record and a 3.31 ERA, with 119 strikeouts in 114 1/3 innings.

== Professional career ==
=== Draft and minor leagues ===
Heading into the 2011 MLB draft, Cole, Bauer, and Danny Hultzen, who was also a college pitcher, were seen as among the best available talents in the draft. The Pittsburgh Pirates selected Cole with the first overall selection. He signed a minor league contract with an $8 million signing bonus, the highest signing bonus ever offered to a rookie, 15 minutes before the signing deadline on August 15, 2011. Though he signed too late to pitch in the 2011 minor league season, he pitched for the Mesa Solar Sox of the Arizona Fall League (AFL). He recorded 16 strikeouts in 15 innings pitched for the Solar Sox and had a 3.00 earned run average (ERA) and a 0.93 walks plus hits per inning pitched ratio (WHIP). He was selected to start the AFL Rising Stars game in November 2011.

The Pirates invited Cole to spring training in 2012 as a non-roster invitee, but they reassigned him to the minor leagues. Cole started the 2012 season with the Bradenton Marauders of the Class A-Advanced Florida State League, along with fellow starting pitcher Jameson Taillon, the Pirates' first selection in the 2010 MLB draft. Cole was named a FSL Mid-Season All-Star. He was promoted to the Altoona Curve of the Class AA Eastern League on June 15, 2012. He was named to appear in the 2012 All-Star Futures Game. In twelve starts with the Curve, Cole pitched to a 2.90 ERA, before the Pirates promoted him to the Indianapolis Indians of the Class AAA International League on August 29, 2012.

Prior to the 2013 season, Cole was ranked as the ninth best prospect in baseball by MLB.com. Cole played for the Indianapolis Indians to start the 2013 season. Cole pitched to a 5–3 record and a 2.91 ERA in 12 starts for Indianapolis.

=== Pittsburgh Pirates (2013–2017) ===
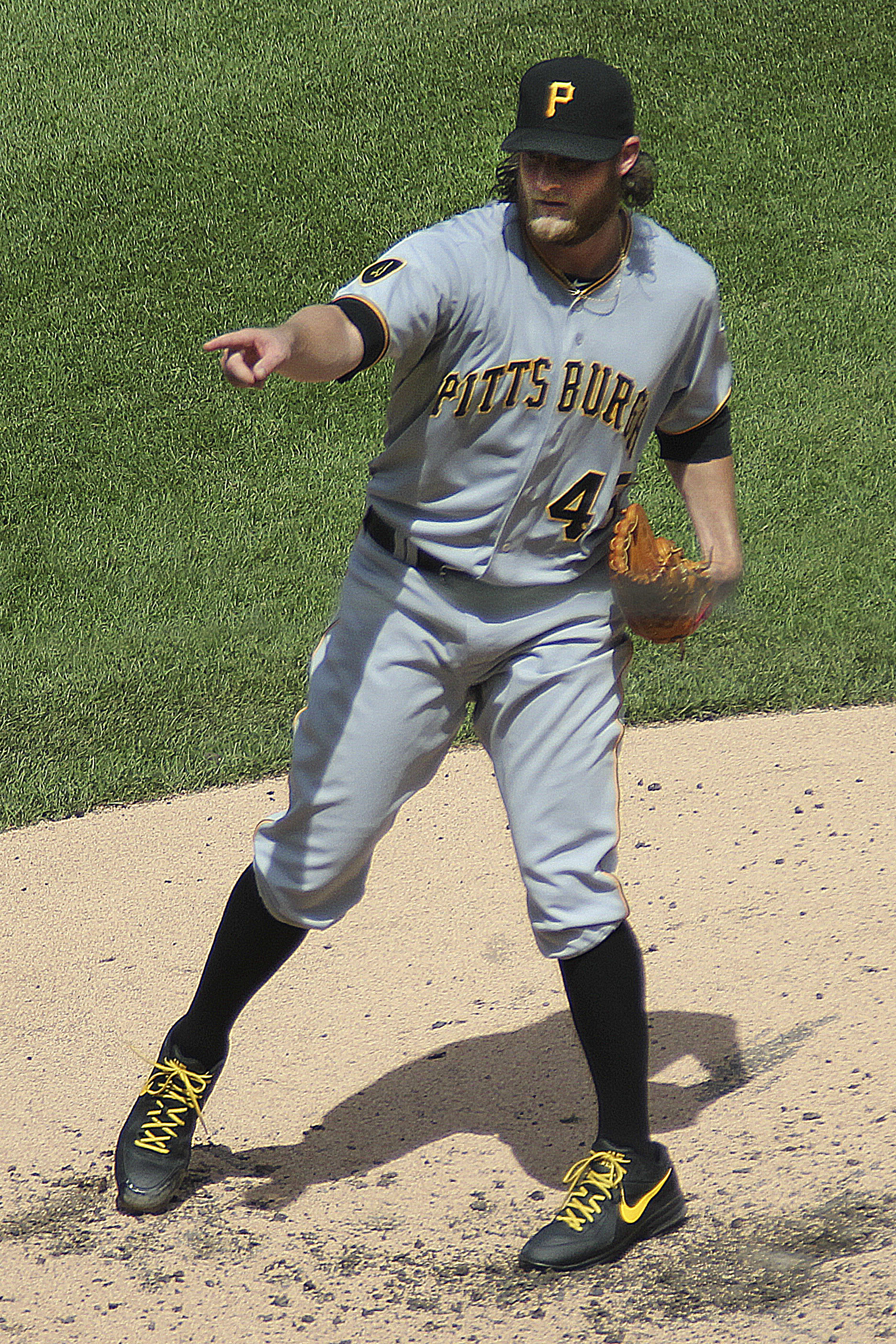
Cole with the Pittsburgh Pirates in 2014

Due to injuries to James McDonald and Wandy Rodríguez, the Pirates promoted Cole to the major leagues, to make his MLB debut on June 11, 2013. During his debut, he struck out the first batter he faced, Gregor Blanco, on three pitches; the last one at 99 miles per hour (159 km/h). He also recorded his first career hit, a 2-run single with the bases loaded in his first career plate appearance. Cole pitched 6 1/3 innings being charged with two earned runs and got the win as the Pirates won over the San Francisco Giants, 8–2. Cole became the fourth pitcher since 1920 to drive in 2+ runs and earn the win in his Major League debut. Cole was the first Pirate to start his career with wins in his first four starts since Nick Maddox in 1907. He was the fifth pitcher for any team to accomplish the feat in the past 40 years, joining Rich Gale of the 1978 Royals, Kaz Ishii of the 2002 Dodgers, Jered Weaver of the 2006 Angels, and Scott Lewis of the 2008 Indians.

Cole was voted the National League (NL) Rookie of the Month for September 2013. On the month, Cole had a 4–0 record and led all rookies with a 1.69 ERA and 39 strikeouts. Cole had a 10–7 record and a 3.22 ERA in 19 starts for Pittsburgh in 2013. Cole started Game Two of the 2013 National League Division Series, going six innings allowing two hits, one earned run, and five strikeouts, and ultimately defeating the St. Louis Cardinals. The Pirates chose Cole to start the deciding Game 5 over A. J. Burnett. The Cardinals won the game and the series.

After focusing on his fastball during his rookie season, Cole entered 2014 spring training working on improving his curveball and slider. Cole had been a durable pitcher in 2014 pitching 75 1/3 innings, but manager Clint Hurdle acknowledged on June 7 that Cole would miss at least one start with shoulder fatigue. Cole was placed on the 15-day disabled list the next day and activated on June 28.

On September 7, 2014, Cole hit his first career home run at Wrigley Field off of Chicago Cubs pitcher Blake Parker. On September 23, Cole helped the Pirates clinch a second consecutive playoff berth by beating Alex Wood and the Atlanta Braves.

Cole won the NL Pitcher of the Month Award for April 2015, after going 4–0 with a 1.76 ERA and 35 strikeouts in 30 2/3 innings pitched for the month. He started the 2015 National League Wild Card Game against the Cubs but took the loss after giving up four earned runs on six hits and a walk in five innings pitched.

On June 14, 2016, Cole was placed on the 15-day disabled list due to a right triceps strain. On July 27, Cole pitched his first complete game against the Seattle Mariners. In 2017, Cole was 12–12 with a 4.26 ERA, as he led the National League with 33 starts.

The Pirates and Cole reached an agreement in January 2018 on a one-year, $6.75 million contract.

=== Houston Astros (2018–2019) ===
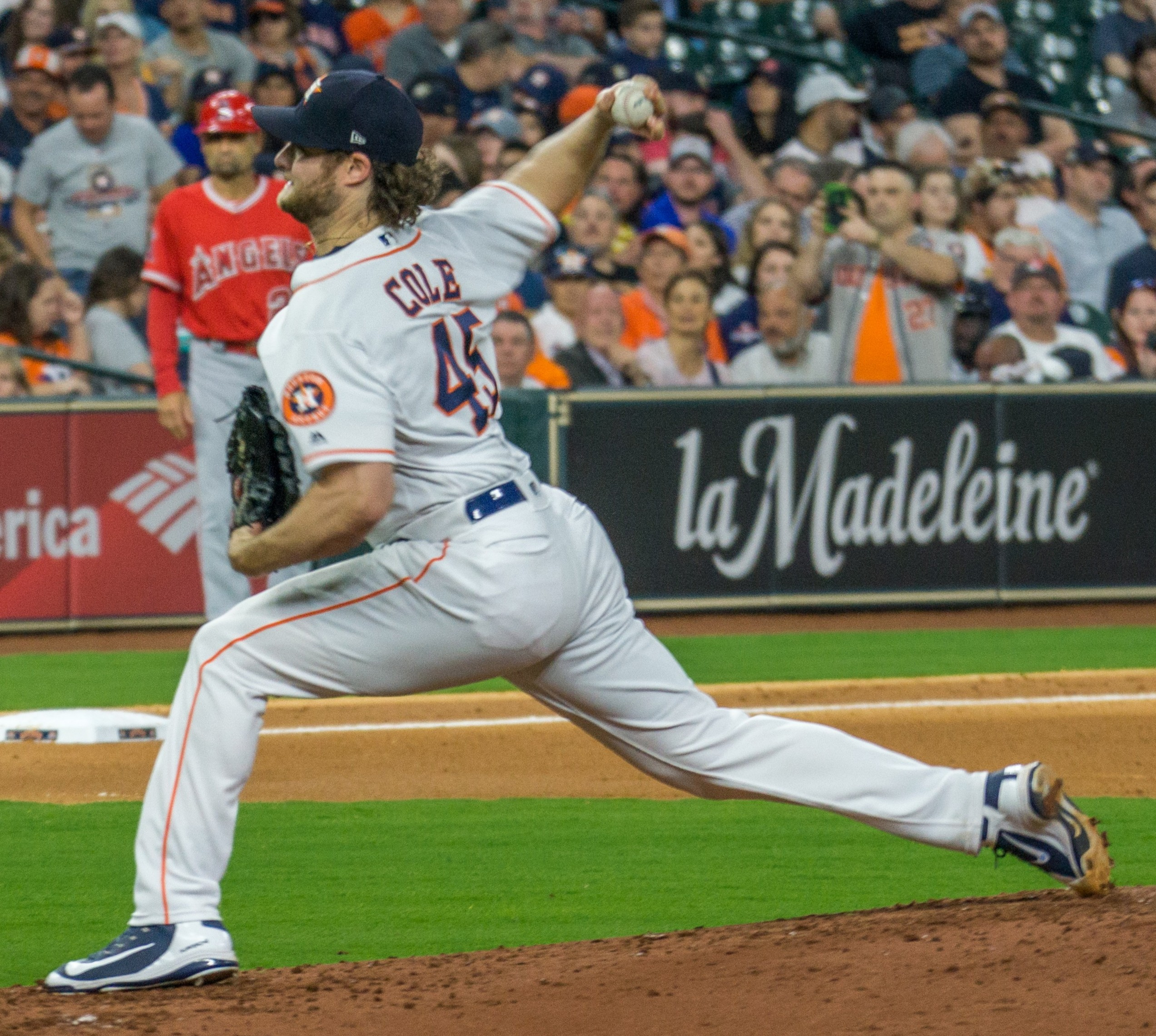
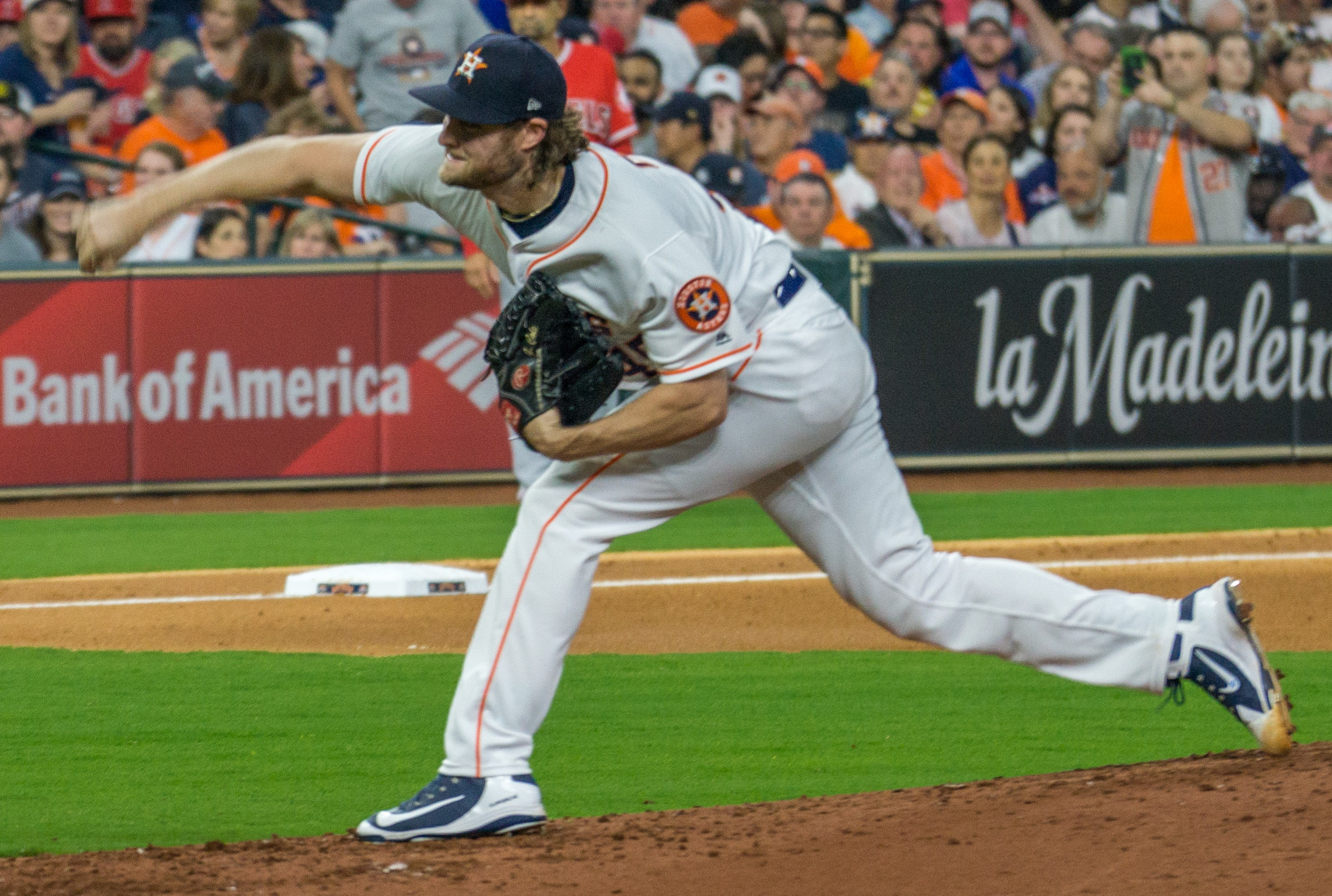
Cole with the Houston Astros in 2018

On January 13, 2018, the Pirates traded Cole to the Houston Astros for Joe Musgrove, Michael Feliz, Colin Moran and Jason Martin.

On April 29, 2018, Cole struck out 12 hitters in a game against the Oakland Athletics that resulted in a no-decision but an Astros win. In doing so, Cole broke the Astros strikeout record for April with 61 strikeouts in the first month. He finished his first month in an Astros uniform going 2–1 with 61 strikeouts and a 1.73 ERA in 4 2/3 innings pitched. On May 4, against the Arizona Diamondbacks Cole struck out 16, allowed only one hit, and pitched his first career shutout as the Astros won 8–0.

Cole was elected to his first American League All-Star appearance (second overall). Cole did not appear in the game but finished the first half of the season with a 10–2 record with a 2.52 ERA and 177 strikeouts. He finished the season with 276 strikeouts, a new career high and good for second-most in the American League behind teammate Justin Verlander, a 15–5 record, and a 2.88 ERA, his best since the 2015 season. He led the majors in strikeouts per 9 innings (12.40). In Game 2 of the 2018 American League Division Series against the Cleveland Indians, Cole struck out 12 and walked none in seven innings in a 3–1 victory. Cole became the second pitcher to strike out at least 12 hitters with no walks in the postseason, after Tom Seaver in the 1973 National League Championship Series.

On September 8, 2019, his 29th birthday, Cole became the second pitcher in MLB history, following Pedro Martínez, to record 14 or more strikeouts in three consecutive games. On September 18, 2019, Cole struck out his 300th batter of the season, becoming the third Astros pitcher to strike out 300 batters in a single season, after J. R. Richard and Mike Scott. Cole became the second-fastest pitcher to register 300 strikeouts in terms of innings pitched. His 198 1/3 innings trailed only Randy Johnson, who achieved the feat in 197 2/3 innings in 2001. The following start, September 24, 2019, Cole struck out 14 batters to break the single-season strikeout record for any Astros pitcher, bringing his total to 316 on the year, and allowing only two singles in his appearance of seven scoreless innings. In his next start on September 29, 2019, Cole set an MLB record with his ninth consecutive outings with at least 10 strikeouts.

Cole's performance since February 2018 and through the 2019 season was markedly different from his earlier seasons, due to intervention by the Astros management and coaching staff. Cole vastly reduced the number of two-seam fastballs he threw, threw more into the top of the strike zone, and increased the spin rate of his fastball.

Cole finished the 2019 season with a 20–5 record and a 0.895 WHIP. He led the American League with a 2.50 ERA and led the major leagues in strikeouts (326), strikeout percentage (39.9%), and strikeouts per nine innings (13.82). He became the first full-time starting pitcher in MLB history to average more than one and a half strikeouts per inning in a season. He finished second in voting for the 2019 Cy Young Award, behind Verlander with 159 points to Verlander's 171.

=== New York Yankees (2020–present) ===
==== 2020 ====
On December 18, 2019, the Yankees signed Cole to a franchise record nine-year, $324 million contract. Cole's contract is the largest signed by a pitcher, topping the $245 million, seven-year contract signed by Stephen Strasburg. Cole's contract has an average annual value of $36 million, which represented the highest average annual value of any player contract in Major League Baseball at that time, eclipsing the previous average annual value record set by Mike Trout, at an average annual value of $35.5 million. The contract also allowed Cole to opt out and become a free agent again after the fifth year; however, if he attempted to do so, the Yankees could have chosen to prevent him from doing so by adding an additional year and $36 million to his contract, which would have brought the total length and value of the contract to 10 years and $360 million.

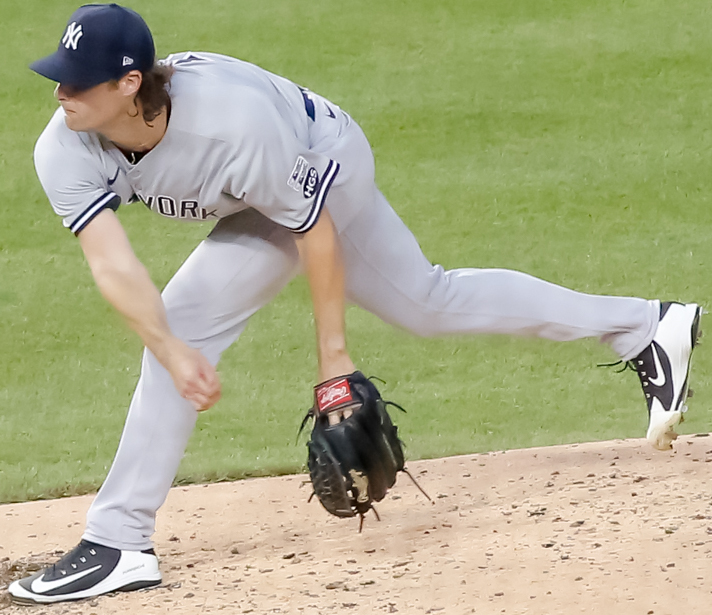
Cole pitching for the New York Yankees in 2020

On July 23, 2020, Cole made his Yankees debut as an Opening Day starting pitcher throwing 5 innings against the Washington Nationals and allowing just one hit, a home run by Adam Eaton. Cole's regular-season winning streak reached 20, the third-longest in MLB history, but his streak ended on August 26, 2020, when he took a loss against the Atlanta Braves. Through August 4, 2020, his 242 strikeouts are a Major League record since his last loss. He would lose three decisions in a row, but on September 11, 2020, Cole ended his 3-game losing streak by throwing a 2-hitter complete game shutout against the Baltimore Orioles. As it was a doubleheader, the game only went 7 innings. He ended his first season as a Yankee with a 7–3 record, throwing to a 2.84 ERA in 73 innings and striking out 94.

On September 29, 2020, in his Yankees playoff debut, during Game 1 of the wild card series against the Cleveland Indians, Cole struck out 13 batters without a walk, tying Tom Seaver (1973 NLCS Game 1) and second most in Yankees franchise history. He also became the first Major Leaguer in history to win three postseason games with 12 or more strikeouts. Only Roger Clemens (15 K's) has fanned more in a postseason start with the Yankees. In the 2020 ALDS against the Tampa Bay Rays, he was the winning pitcher in Game 1, and received a no-decision in the decisive game 5, which the Yankees would go on to lose.

==== 2021 ====
On April 12, after recording 8 strikeouts and retiring 15 batters in a row in a game against the Toronto Blue Jays, Cole became the Yankees pitcher with the most strikeouts in the first three starts of the season of all time, matching David Cone (1997) with 29. On May 12, 2021, Cole notched his 1,500th career strikeout, becoming the second-fastest pitcher in history to reach the milestone behind Randy Johnson.

Cole finished the 2021 season with a 3.23 ERA and 243 strikeouts in 181 1/3 innings over 30 starts. He led the American League with 16 wins and a 5.93 strikeout-to-walk ratio. He finished second in American League Cy Young Award voting behind Robbie Ray.

In the 2021 American League Wild Card Game at Fenway Park, Cole pitched two innings and gave up three earned runs and two home runs in a loss to the Boston Red Sox.

On November 23, Cole was named a First Team selection for the All-MLB Team, which was determined by a fan vote and a panel consisting of media members, former players, and baseball officials. It was his third consecutive All-MLB selection, as he was on the First Team in 2019 with the Houston Astros, and appeared on the Second Team with the Yankees in 2020.

==== 2022 ====
Against the Minnesota Twins on June 9, Cole allowed three consecutive home runs to the first three batters he faced. He allowed 5 total home runs in only 2.1 innings, but the Yankees came back and won 10–7. While playing against the Seattle Mariners on August 3, Cole allowed 6 runs in the first inning on 3 home runs. It was the most runs allowed in the first inning at home since Phil Hughes back in 2013.

On October 4, 2022, Cole recorded his 249th strikeout of the season against the Texas Rangers, surpassing Ron Guidry for the franchise record. He made 33 starts in 2022 with an MLB-leading 257 strikeouts, a 13–8 record, a 3.50 ERA, and a career-high 33 home runs allowed. He received one fifth place vote in balloting for the Cy Young Award. Cole became the first right-handed pitcher in New York Yankees franchise history to lead all of MLB in strikeouts in a single season and the first Yankee to lead the American League in strikeouts since Al Downing in 1964.

==== 2023 ====
Cole was named the AL Pitcher of the Month in April after winning five of six starts and allowing only 5 runs in 40.2 innings pitched. He registered his 2,000th career strikeout during a game against the Baltimore Orioles on May 23, becoming the 87th pitcher overall to reach this milestone. He also became the third-fastest pitcher in MLB history (1,714.2 fewest innings) to reach accomplish this feat, just behind Chris Sale (1,626) and Pedro Martinez (1,711.1).

On July 10, 2023, Cole was named the starting pitcher for the 2023 MLB All-Star Game, the first time that a Yankees starting pitcher started the All-Star game since Roger Clemens in 2001. On September 27, against the Blue Jays, Cole pitched a complete game shutout in his final start of the 2023 season.

Cole finished 2023 with 33 games started, accumulating a 15-4 record with an ERA of 2.63 and registering 222 strikeouts in 209 innings. He made 24 quality starts and pitched two complete games. Cole also lowered his WHIP to 0.98 for the season. He conceded 20 home runs, his lowest in a non-shortened season since 2018.

After the season, Cole won the AL Cy Young Award by a unanimous vote.

==== 2024 ====
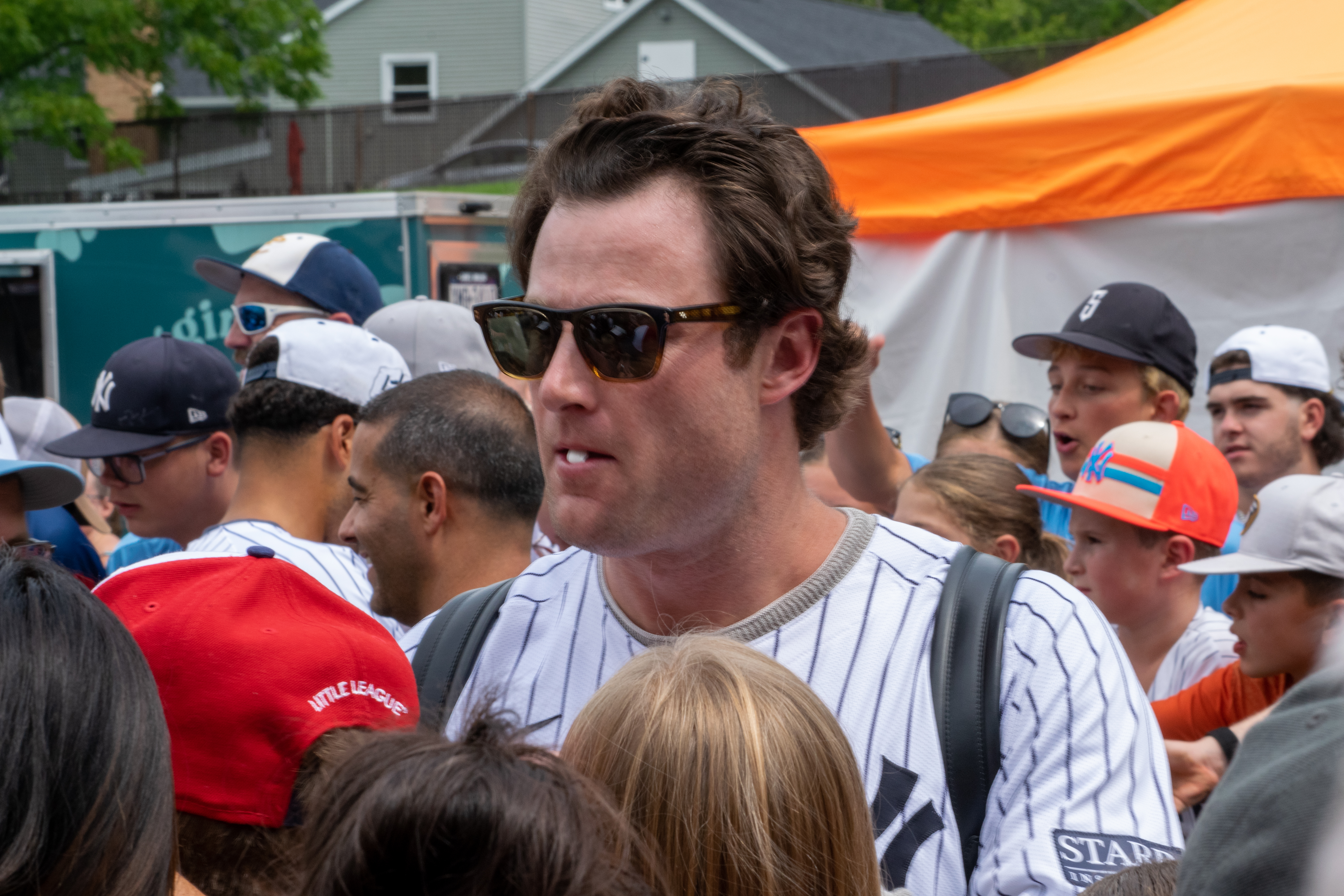
Cole with the Yankees in 2024

During spring training, Cole began to experience discomfort in his right elbow. He was deactivated from all baseball activities for at least a month and sent to California to have Dr. Neal ElAttrache perform some additional opinions. The elbow only had inflammation and edema, meaning that Cole was recommended to rest for 3-4 weeks. He was placed on the 60–day injured list on March 28, 2024. On June 19, Cole was activated from the injured list. He made his first major league start on June 19 against the Baltimore Orioles, registering five strikeouts in four innings pitched. In his second start on June 25, Cole conceded six runs across four innings against the New York Mets without recording a strikeout, only the second time in his major league career that he failed to record a strikeout. On June 30, against the Toronto Blue Jays, Cole collected his first win for 2024.

Cole appeared in the World Series for the second time in his career, pitching in Games 1 and 5 against the Los Angeles Dodgers but receiving a no-decision in each. On November 2, Cole opted out of his contract with the Yankees, however the team could add one year and $36 million to his existing deal by Sunday evening to void the opt out and extend his contract and tenure with the team.

On November 4, it was announced that Cole would return to the Yankees and would not become a free agent. He remained with the team on a four-year, $144 million contract, effectively reversing his opt-out decision.

==== 2025 ====
Cole (far right) with fellow starting pitchers, from right: Max Fried, Carlos Rodón, and Clarke Schmidt

Again during spring training, Cole began experiencing discomfort in his pitching elbow, allowing 6 runs in two innings during a spring training outing. After getting MRI scans, Cole announced via his Instagram that he would undergo Tommy John surgery after being recommended the procedure by medical personnel. As a result, he missed the entire 2025 season.

==== 2026 ====
Cole began the 2026 year on the injured list to continue recovering from Tommy John surgery he had the previous year. On April 17, Cole was optioned to Double-A Somerset for a rehab assignment. On April 22, his rehab assignment was adjusted to the High-A Hudson Valley Renegades. Cole made his major league season debut on May 22 against the Tampa Bay Rays, throwing six scoreless innings in his first appearance for the Yankees since the 2024 World Series. The following week, Cole struck out ten hitters in 6⅔ innings against the Kansas City Royals in his second start for the season, again not allowing any runs. On September 1 at Angel Stadium, in a 7–3 win over the Los Angeles Angels, Cole earned his 161st career Major League victory, tying Mike Moore for the most ever by a pitcher who was drafted first overall.

== Pitching style ==
Cole is a power pitcher who features a four-seam and two-seam fastball that he regularly throws around 97 mph, but have been clocked as high as 102 miles per hour (164 km/h) in college. He also throws a slider, knuckle curve, changeup, and as of 2022, has reintroduced his cutter which is a pitch he has not thrown since college. Between 2017 and 2018, due to his increased spin rate and a more complete arm deceleration and follow-through, his fastball got a lower WHIP, and used his sinker less often, no longer "pitching to contact". He throws from a low three-quarters position. In the first round of 2019 ALDS, his strikeout pitches were high fastballs, sliders and knuckle curveballs which curve down and away from right-handed batters.

== Records ==
- MLB record for most consecutive strikeouts without issuing a walk (61) – 2021
- Most strikeouts by a Houston Astros pitcher in a single season (326) – 2019
- Most strikeouts by a New York Yankees pitcher in a single season (257) – 2022 (first right handed starting pitcher in New York Yankees franchise history to lead all of MLB in strikeouts in a single season)
- Most strikeouts by a New York Yankees pitcher on Opening Day (11) – 2023

== Personal life ==
Cole grew up as a fan of the New York Yankees, as his father, raised in Syracuse, New York, passed down his affinity for the Yankees to his son. Cole attended the 2001 World Series, in which the Yankees took part. He held a sign that said "YANKEE FAN TODAY TOMORROW FOREVER," and a photograph shared by Newsday went viral in 2019 when news of his signing with the Yankees was reported. He brought the sign to his introductory press conference with the Yankees. Cole is of Italian descent.

Cole is married to Amy Crawford, a former UCLA softball player and the sister of Brandon Crawford. They met when they attended UCLA. On January 1, 2020, Amy announced their first pregnancy. Their son Caden Gerrit Cole was born on June 30, 2020. Their second son Everett was born on January 2, 2023. They live in Greenwich, Connecticut. Cole has a passion for cooking, and he and his wife had a blog where they wrote about their favorite recipes. Cole is musically inclined and plays piano and guitar and can read sheet music.

Cole has a younger sister, Erin, who attended UCLA, where she played for the Bruins soccer team.

On December 4, 2020, Cole was elected to the MLBPA's Executive Subcommittee.

== See also ==
- Hickok Belt
- Houston Astros award winners and league leaders • Team records
- New York Yankees award winners and league leaders • Team records
- List of Major League Baseball annual strikeout leaders
- List of Major League Baseball career strikeout leaders
- List of Major League Baseball annual shutout leaders
- List of Major League Baseball career WHIP leaders
- List of people from Newport Beach, California
- List of University of California, Los Angeles people
- List of World Series starting pitchers

Awards and achievements
Preceded by Adam Wainwright	National League Pitcher of the Month; April 2015	Succeeded by Max Scherzer
Preceded by Lucas Giolito; Mike Clevinger; Chris Bassitt; Alek Manoah	American League Pitcher of the Month; June–July 2019; September 2019; April 2021; April 2023	Succeeded by Mike Clevinger; Shane Bieber; Rich Hill; Nathan Eovaldi
Preceded by Justin Verlander	Major League Baseball annual WHIP leader 2023	Succeeded by Most recent
