= Newport Harbor High School =

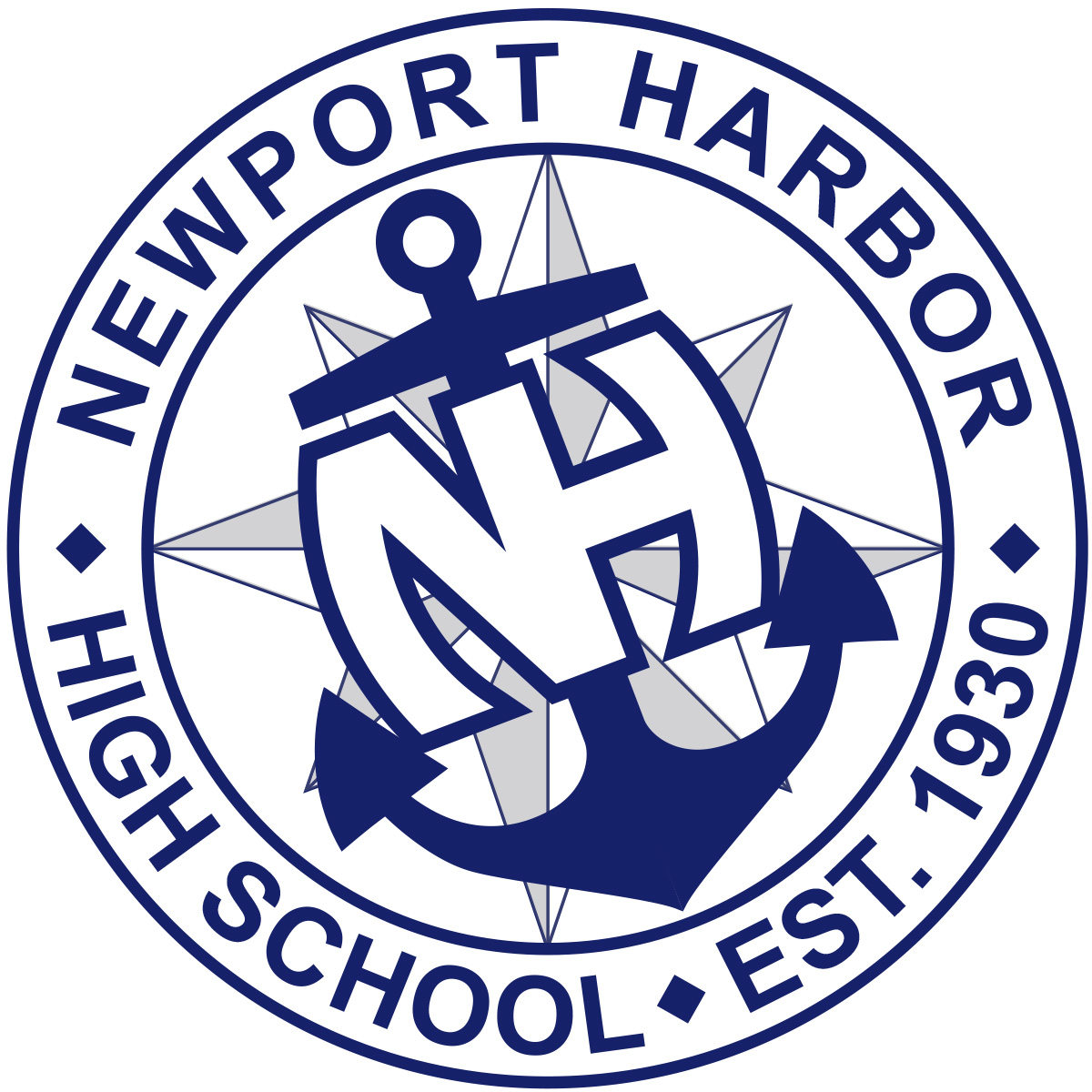

Location
- 600 Irvine Avenue; Newport Beach, California 92663; United States; 33°37′22″N 117°54′48″W

Information
- School type: Public
- Motto: Sailor Pride, Home of the Sailors
- Established: 1930
- Principal: Kevin Astor
- Faculty: 107
- Teaching staff: 95.77 (FTE)
- Enrollment: 2,217 (2023-2024)
- Student to teacher ratio: 23.15
- Colors: Blue and Gray
- Athletics conference: CIF Southern Section; Sunset League
- Mascot: Tommy Tar
- Team name: Sailors
- Rival: Corona Del Mar
- Accreditation: IBO
- Website: nhhs.nmusd.us

Newport Harbor High School is a public high school in Newport Beach, California, United States. It is part of the Newport-Mesa Unified School District. The school primarily serves students in western Newport Beach and southern Costa Mesa.

== Demographics ==
Roughly 2260 students enroll across grades 9-12 (2021). 59% of students are White, 35% Hispanic, and 6% other. 82 full-time faculty teach across 9 departments.

== History ==
Roughly two months after the Wall Street crash of 1929, on December 29, 1929, the Irvine Company offered 20 acres (8.1 ha) of land to the school district located at 15th and Irvine for $15,000.

Night photograph of the new NHHS Robins-Loats Building

Ground breaking for the first high school in Newport Beach began June 14, 1930, at an original construction cost of $410,000. The original school comprised a main building, the main gym, the tower, a wood shop, the bus garage, and a caretaker's cottage. The total enrollment that first year was just 178 students, taught by 12 faculty members. There were no seniors, as they had chosen to remain at their original schools to graduate with their alma maters' class.

By 1948, the school had its first gym, metal shop, and snack bar. Eight army barracks were installed to be used as classrooms. When the big football stadium was finally built, it was named Davidson Field in honor of Sidney Davidson, the school's first principal. He had the altruistic distinction of working for the first seven months without pay.

In 2005, a $282 million school bond issue Measure F was approved by local ballot. Passage of Measure F allows for certain improvements to local schools and libraries in the district.

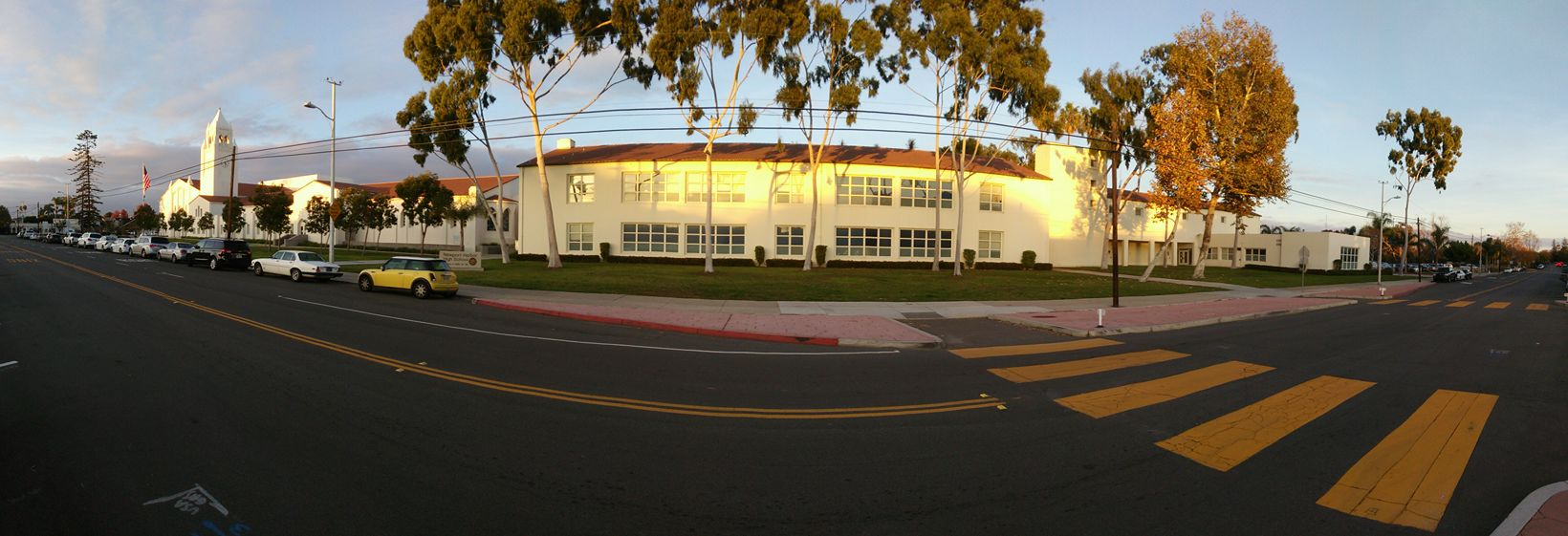
Panorama of Newport Harbor High School from 15th Street, Newport Beach - Dec. 11, 2016

Newport Harbor High School received funding from Measure F that included demolition of the 70,000-square-foot (6,500 m^{2}) Robins-Loats building, its replacement by an all new 100,000-square-foot (9,300 m^{2}) steel-framed building, and rebuilding the landmark 100-foot (30 m) bell tower. The "Robins-Loats Reconstruction" costs are estimated at $45 million. The original Robins Hall Tower stood for 77 years. The tower was demolished in August 2007 because of earthquake code requirements.

== Academics ==
Newport Harbor High School (NHHS) has been designated a California Distinguished School, International Baccalaureate World School, and National Blue Ribbon School. Based on the Accountability Progress Report, Newport Harbor is ranked 8 out of 10 in the state.

Newport Harbor offers a variety of Advanced Placement courses for the students. These courses include: Art History, Studio Art: 2-D Design, Biology, Calculus, Chemistry, Comparative Government and Politics, Computer Science, English Language and Composition, English Literature and Composition, Environmental Science, European History, U.S. Government and Politics, Physics, Psychology, Spanish Language and Culture, World History, and US History.

NHHS began offering the International Baccalaureate Diploma Program in 2010. Successful completion of AP and IB courses is usually rewarded with course credit or used for placement.

In addition to accelerated coursework, NHHS also offers the Career Technical Education (CTE) Pathway: a multiyear sequence of courses that integrates core academic knowledge with technical and occupational knowledge to provide students with a pathway to post-secondary education and careers. CTE has three pathways: (1) Digital Media Arts, (2) Business, and (3) Culinary.

== Athletics ==
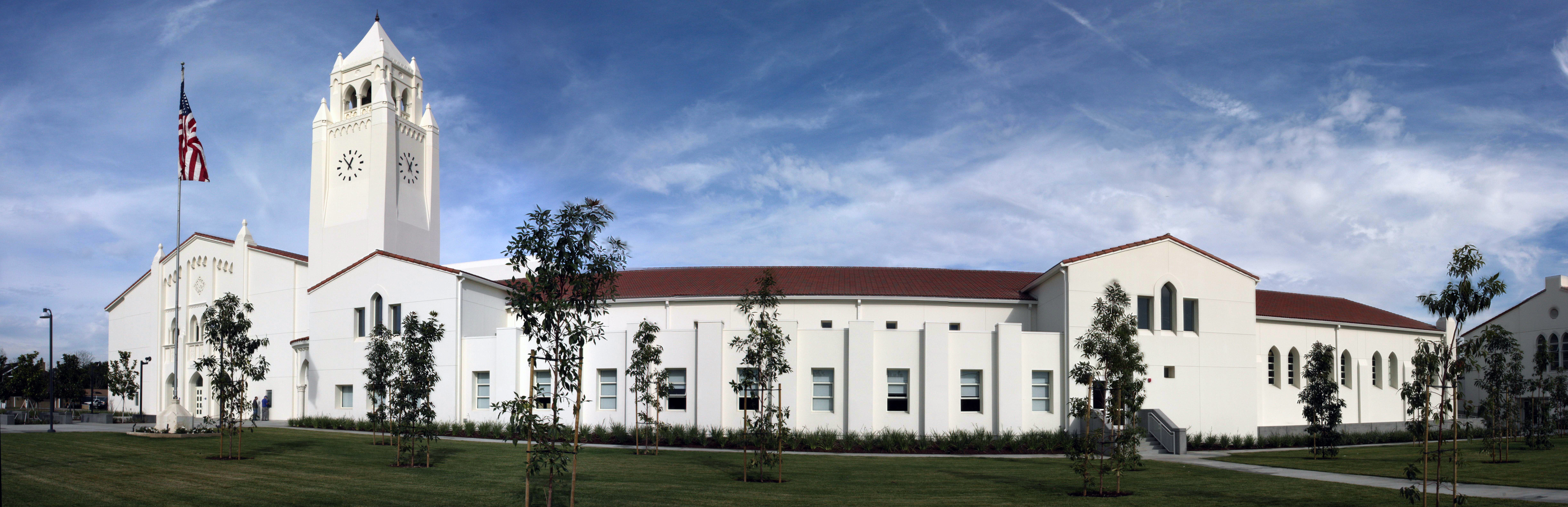
Panorama of the new NHHS Robin-Loats Building

Newport Harbor High School has water polo, lacrosse, volleyball, tennis, baseball, football, basketball, cross country, field hockey, sailing, soccer, softball, surf, track and field and wrestling teams. Its teams compete in the Sunset League of the California Interscholastic Federation's Southern Section. NHHS teams are known as the Sailors, though fans also refer to them as the "Tars". The school colors are primarily blue and gray, and the mascot is Tommy Tar, a representation of Popeye the Sailor Man. Each year the Sailors football team plays in "The Battle of The Bay" against their cross-town rival, Corona Del Mar High School.

== Activities ==
Newport Harbor offers co-curricular activities for course credit, including: band/jazz band, cheer squad, choir, dance, drama, newspaper, surf team, yearbook and ASB.

== Art at Newport Harbor ==
Newport Harbor has made a significant commitment to the arts. Beginning in 1935, Principal Sidney Davidson urged senior classes to purchase paintings from local artists as their gift to the school. The class of 1935 purchased Snow Scene by Thomas Hunt. In 1937, through the Depression Era Federal Art Project, the school commissioned two mosaics: The Boys by Arthur Ames and The Girls by Jean Goodwin. Over the course of several decades, the school acquired a collection of art through hosting the annual Newport Beach Art Exhibition, showcasing notable Southern California artists. Each year, an oil and watercolor winner were purchased. By 1946, The Newport Beach Chamber of Commerce agreed to sponsor the shows with $300 in purchase prize money. Different critics judged the event each year, allowing the collection to "pull together a collection that would have the major Edgar Payne (work) from the 1920s, the Bob Irwin abstract Expressionist canvas from the late 1950s, the fine Frederick Hammersley abstract classicist work in 1963 and the Edie Danieli from the Op era". The librarian responsible for procuring the collection, Ruth Stoever Fleming, serves as namesake for the art collection. The legacy of the art earned the school an ALA John Cotton Dana Award.

== Notable alumni ==
- Geoff Abrams, tennis player
- Terry Albritton, shot putter
- Steve Aoki, Electro House musician
- Hope Bender, Track and Field athlete
- Amy Biehl, anti-apartheid activist
- Charlie Buckingham, Olympian, sailing
- Dave Cadigan, NFL football player
- Ethan Cochran, discus thrower
- Charlie Colin, musician (Train), Grammy winning songwriter
- Richie Collins (surfer), professional surfer
- Douglas Crockford, programmer
- Luca Cupido, Olympian, water polo
- Kaleigh Gilchrist, Olympian, Water Polo
- Dana Sue Gray, serial killer
- Peter Jason, actor
- Greg Laurie, pastor and evangelist
- Paul Le Mat, actor
- Esther Lofgren, Olympic gold medalist, rowing
- Gray Lyda, comic book artist and writer
- Greg MacGillivray, filmmaker
- Misty May, professional beach volleyball player, Olympic gold medalist
- Kelly McGillis, actress
- Ted McGinley, actor
- David McKenna (writer)
- Lee Mallory, poet, editor, retired professor
- Frank Marshall, filmmaker
- Marguerite Moreau, actress
- Jim Neidhart, wrestler, held shot put record from 1973 to 1985
- Aaron Peirsol, 7× Olympic medalist, swimming
- Bruce Penhall, racer, actor
- Kasey Peters, American football player
- Gary Riley, actor
- April Ross, AVP beach volleyball player, Olympic medalist
- James M. Seely, USN admiral
- Sharon Sheeley, songwriter
- Allison Stokke, pole vaulter
- Steve Timmons, 2× Olympic gold medalist, volleyball
- Bill Voss, former Major League Baseball player
- Tyson Wahl, Major League Soccer player
- Patrick Warburton, actor
- Ethan Wayne, actor
- Robert "Wingnut" Weaver, surfer
- Zach Wells, Major League soccer player
- Irene Worth, actress
- George Yardley, NBA Hall of Fame
- Anthony Zerbe, actor
- Constance Zimmer, actress
- Connor Seabold, KBO baseball player
