= Ahwatukee, Phoenix =

Ahwatukee
- Urban village
- Ahwatukee Foothills Village
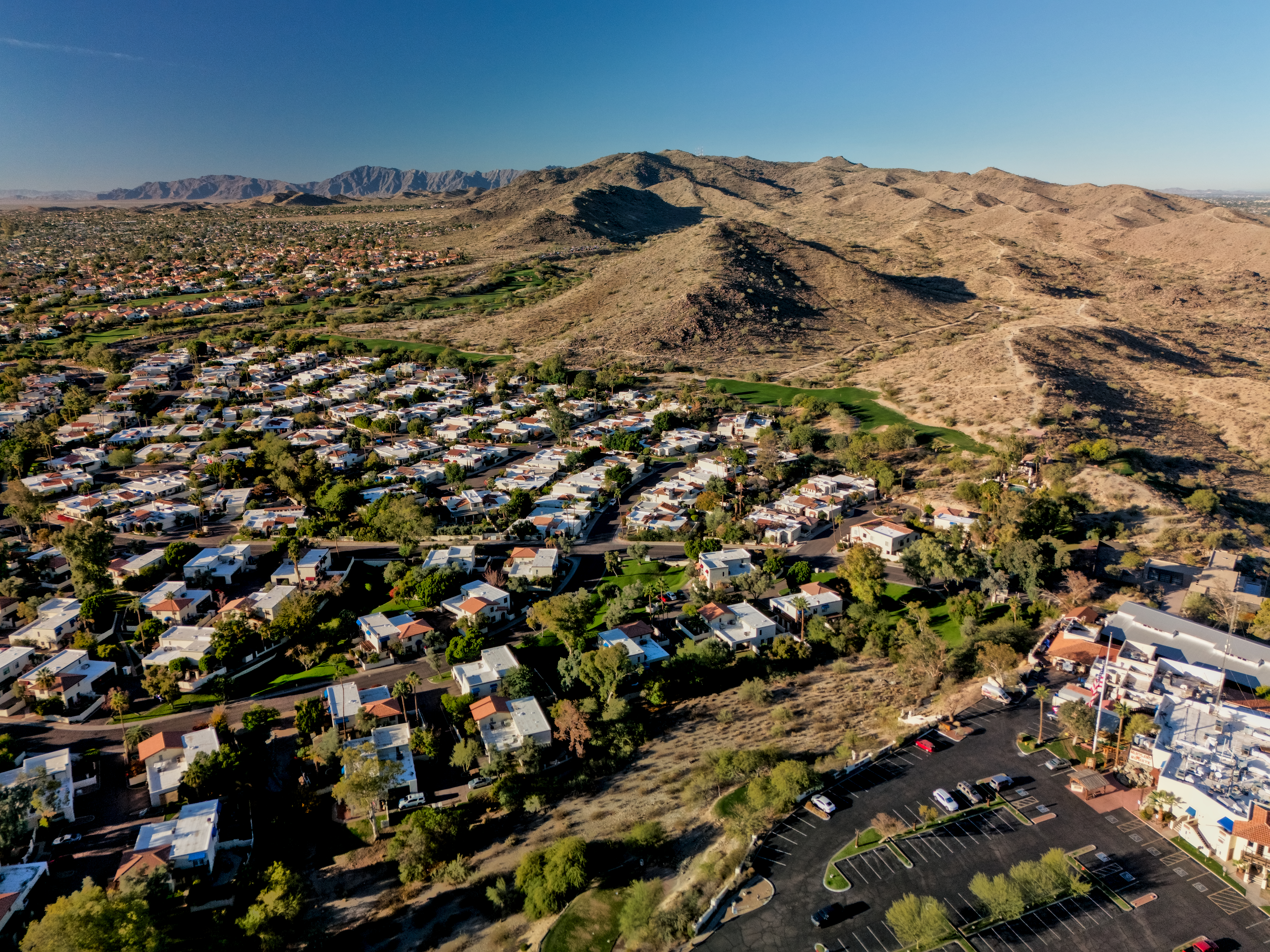
- Drone photo of Ahwatukee neighborhoods and South Mountain Park, December 2023
- Motto: Warm People, Bright Future
- Location of the Ahwatukee Foothills highlighted in red.

- Location within Arizona Location within the United States
- Coordinates: 33°20′30″N 111°59′3″W
- Country: United States
- State: Arizona
- County: Maricopa
- City: Phoenix

Area
  - Total: 35.8 sq mi (93 km^{2})
- Elevation: 1,283 ft (391 m)

Population (2016 Estimate)
  - Total: 83,464
  - Density: 1,783/sq mi (688/km^{2})
- GNIS feature ID: 24705
- Website: Ahwatukee Foothills Village Planning Committee

Ahwatukee Foothills (also Ahwatukee) is an urban village of Phoenix. Ahwatukee is the southernmost part of Phoenix and is considered part of the East Valley region of the Phoenix metropolitan area.

In 2022, Niche rated Ahwatukee "#1 in Best Neighborhoods to Live in Phoenix".

== History ==
=== Beginnings ===
Prior to the area's development, the name "Ahwatukee" referred to a now-demolished house which was in an area near Sequoia Trails and Appaloosa Drive, west of the Warner-Elliot Loop. At least two major thoroughfares in today's Ahwatukee are named after people who claimed lands in the area, in the decades after the signing of the Homestead Act in 1862. Warner Road was named after Samuel Warner of Kansas, while Elliot Road was named after Reginald Elliott of California. Both claimed lands in the area now known as Tempe, Arizona next to Phoenix. A third man, Arthur Hunter, claimed land within an area now known as Ahwatukee. The street known today as 48th Street was, for a time, named Hunter Drive, after Arthur Hunter. In the 1940s the rumor goes, Hunter disassembled and buried in the Ahwatukee desert a Studebaker car purportedly owned by Al Capone.

=== Ahwatukee ranch ===
One of the first houses in the area was built by Dr. William Van Bergen Ames, who co-founded Northwestern University's now-closed dental school in Evanston, Illinois. north of Chicago. The house was built on a piece of land measuring over 2,000 acres (810 ha), which was purchased for $4 an acre.

At the time, the Chandler Arizonan newspaper called the house, built in the foothills of the South Mountain, "unmatched in scope and size". The house was noted to be a 12,000 square feet (1,100 m^{2}) winter residence, designed by prominent Phoenix architect Lester Mahoney, with construction starting in 1921. The house was given the name "The Mystic House" by the Chandler Arizonan, due to its cost, size, and isolated location. The Ames, however, called it Casa de Sueños. They moved into the house on Thanksgiving of 1921, but Dr. Ames died suddenly in February 1922. Ames' wife continued to spend her winters at the house until her death in 1933.

After Ames' wife's death, the Ames' property in Ahwatukee was willed to St. Luke's Hospital. The property was bought by Helen Brinton in 1935, who gave the house (and eventually the area) the name it is known by today (as explained below). Brinton died in 1960 and the house was demolished in 1979.

=== Proving grounds ===
In 1946, the International Harvester Company rented land from a United States Army tank testing facility west of today's Lakewood community, for use as truck and heavy equipment proving grounds. The proving grounds eventually grew to over 4,000 acres (1,600 ha).

The grounds were designed to stress-test trucks and heavy equipment with, among other things, a 7.5 miles (12.1 km) test track, dirt tracks, a special testing area with 20 to 60% grade, service shops, and a runway for company executives. The grounds were sold to a property development company in 1983, due to a combination of economic issues, labor union problems, and a patent infringement judgement against the company. The area is now a part of The Foothills and Club West developments.

=== Development ===
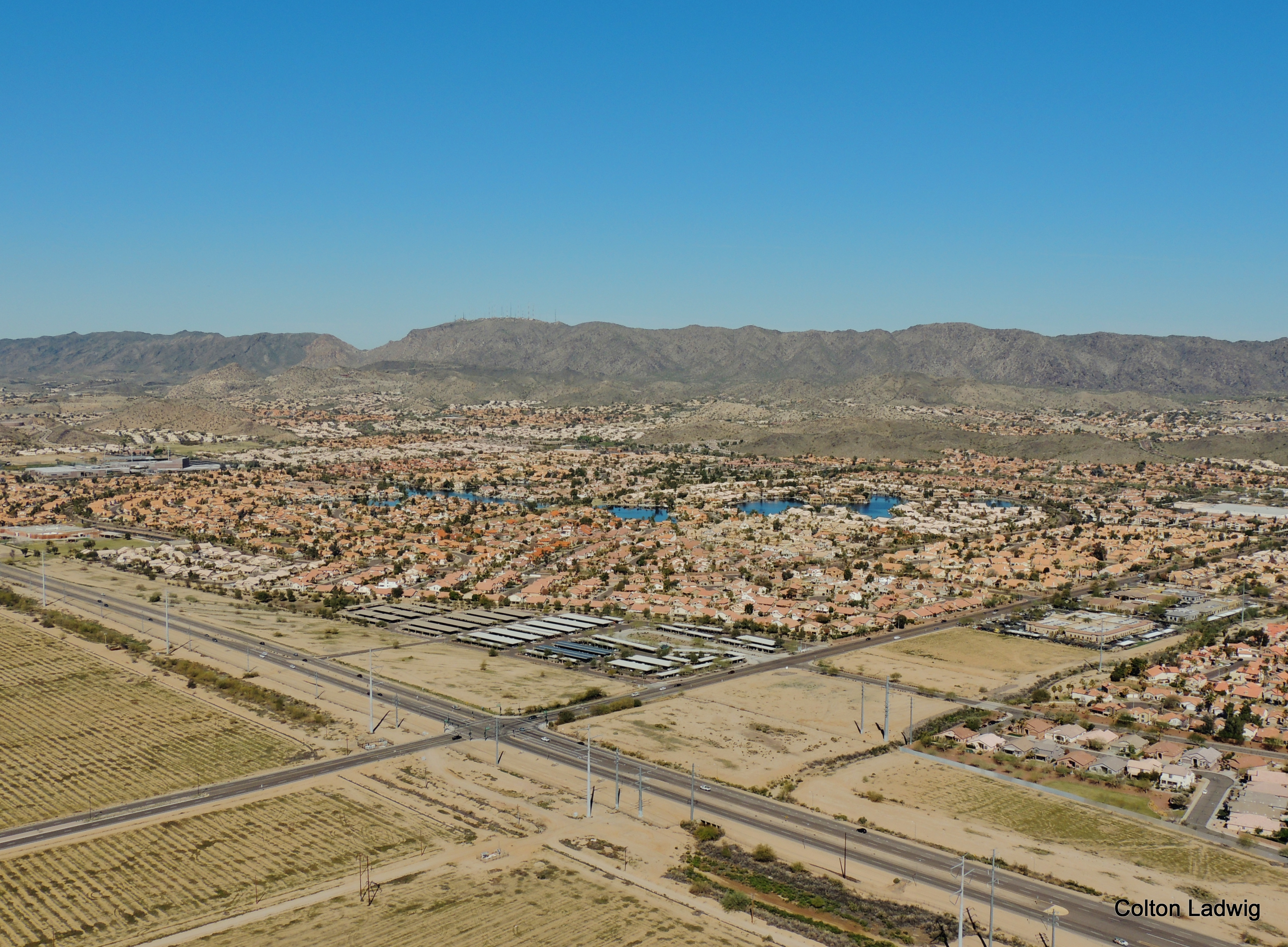
The Ahwahtukee Foothills on the south side of the South Mountains, November 2014

Development of Ahwatukee began in 1970, when Presley Development Company led by Randall Presley, bought 2,080 acres (840 ha) of land. The land included Ahwatukee Ranch, then owned by a land syndicate led by an English professor at Arizona State University in Tempe, as well as land owned by a local moving and storage firm. Presley originally planned for the area to be a retirement community, but later devised a mix of retirement living, family living, and light commercial zoning for the area.

Presley Development was noted to have a role in Ahwatukee eventually becoming a part of Phoenix, instead of neighboring Chandler or Tempe through a handshake deal between Maricopa County Supervisor Bob Stark, who was also an attorney with Presley Development, and Phoenix Mayor John D. Driggs. However, Chandler and Tempe officials were noted to have refused offers of annexing Ahwatukee.

Phoenix annexed the area in stages from 1980 to 1987. It has been suggested that Phoenix's annexation of Ahwatukee to a degree affected Tempe's future development. Plans for Ahwatukee were approved by Maricopa County in November 1971, and 17 model homes were opened in an area near 50th Street and Elliot Road in 1973. In the same year as the model homes’ opening, the Arizona State Legislature set aside $5 million to build a prison near the proving grounds. Plans for the prison, however, were later scrapped.

The area's first elementary school, Kyrene de las Lomas Elementary School, opened in 1976 and Mountain Pointe High School opened as the area's first high school in 1991.

Recent development in Ahwatukee reflects continued growth in the area, including both residential and commercial projects. Plans for the Upper Canyon development include more than 1,500 housing units across a 373 acre site, with construction beginning in the mid 2020s. In addition, large scale commercial projects such as a proposed data center further highlight ongoing expansion and changing land use within the community.

=== Etymology ===
There are three theories surrounding the name "Ahwatukee", with all three claiming the name has roots in the Crow language. Some stories of the name's origin trace back to Brinton, who is said to have chosen a Crow-rooted name for her new property due to her time with the Crow Nation tribal members in Wyoming, and the influence it subsequently had on her.

==== House of dreams ====
Some sources claim the name is a Crow term for house of your dreams, house of my dreams, or house of dreams Until at least 2006, the Ahwatukee Foothills Chamber of Commerce acknowledged "house of dreams" as the meaning of the area's name. However, according to the Crow language dictionary maintained by the Crow Language Consortium, the Crow word for "house" is ashé, and the Crow word for "dream" is baashíale or balewaashíale.

==== Land on the other side of the hill ====
Some sources claim the name is a Crow term for "land on the other side of the hill", based on the Crow word awe chuuke. According to the same Crow dictionary, the word awé means "ground", "land", or "earth", and the word chúuke means "over the ridge", "over the hill", or "the next valley over".

==== Flat land ====
According to one source, the name closely resembles a Crow term for "flat land" or "prairie". According to the Crow language dictionary maintained by the Crow Language Consortium, the Crow word for "flat land" is alawachúhke.

== Geography ==
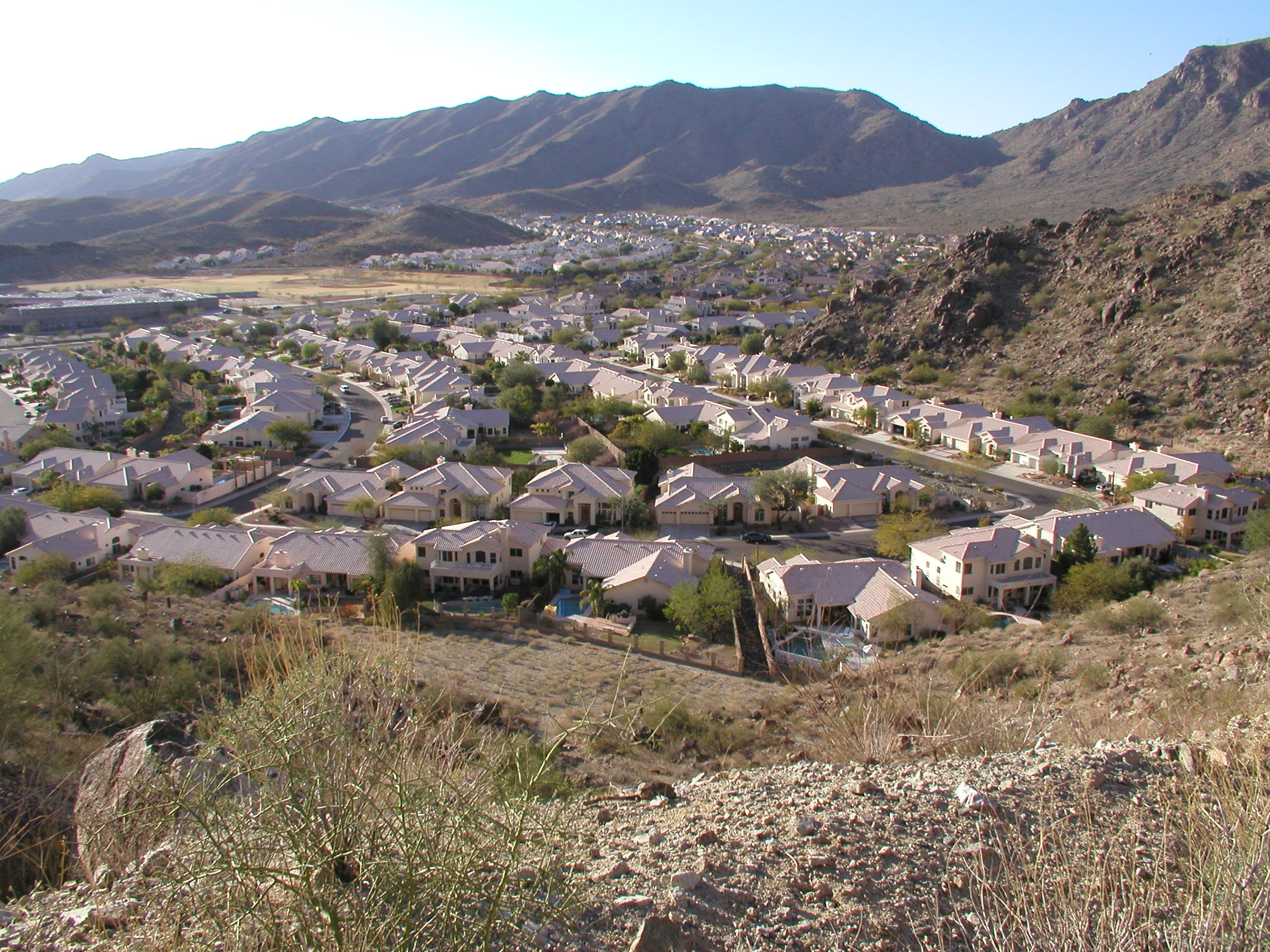
Typical Ahwatukee neighborhood as seen from South Mountain Park, February 2002

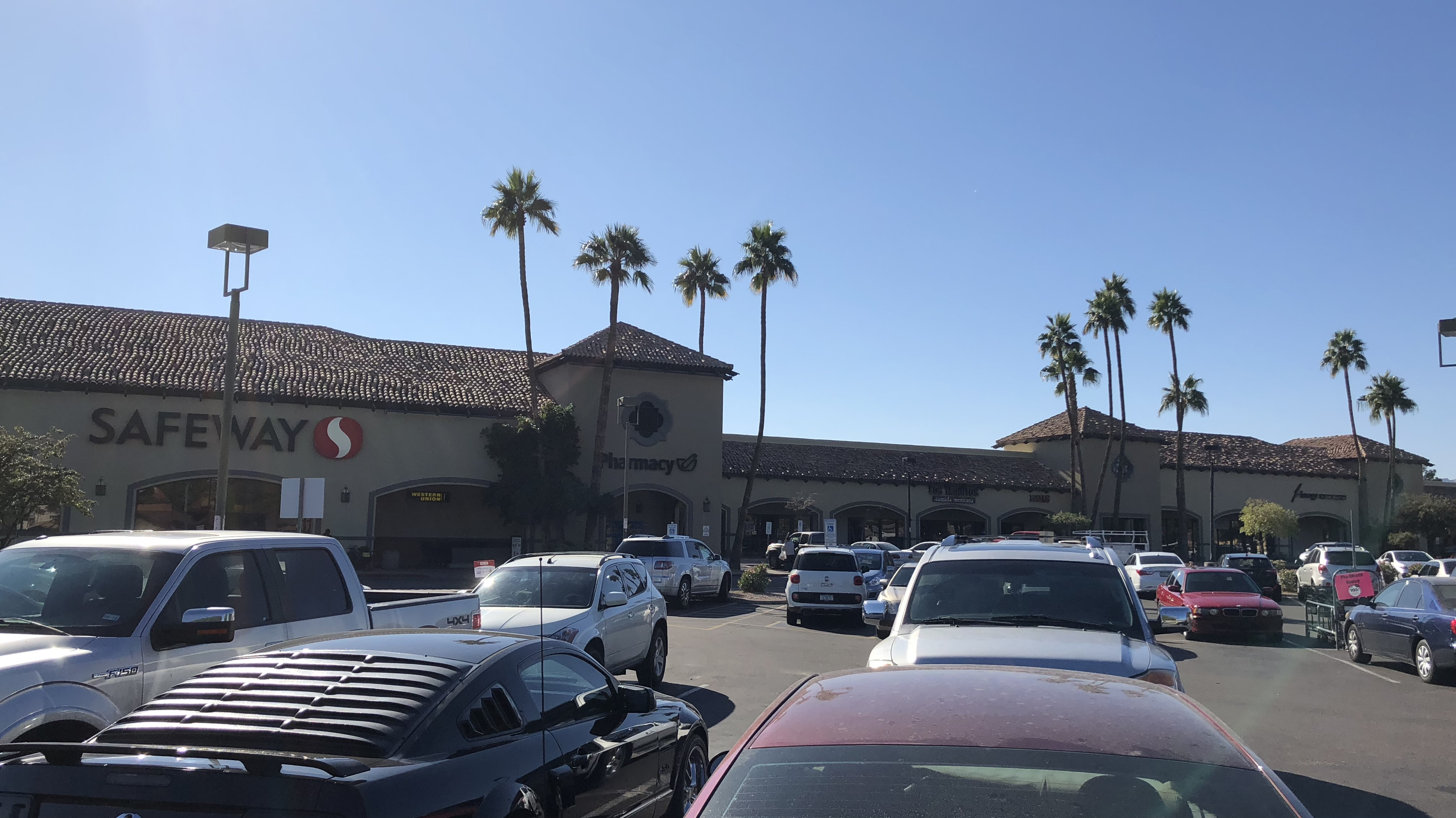
Ahwatukee Mercado, a strip mall on Elliot Road in Ahwatukee, December 2017

The Ahwatukee Foothills Village is bordered by Interstate 10 to the east, South Mountains to the north, and the Gila River Indian Community as well as Loop 202 to the west and south. Ahwatukee is geographically isolated from the rest of Phoenix, and was once seen as appropriate for semi-rural development.

== Demographics ==
Based on 2016 estimates, the Ahwatukee Foothills Village has 83,464 residents. 83% of the population are White, 6.5% are Asian, 5.6% are Black or African American, 1.6% are Native American and 3.3% identify as some other race. 12.3% of the population is Hispanic.

== Education ==
=== Public ===
K-8 public school students in the area attend schools operated by the Kyrene School District. Ahwatukee-based schools are 12 out of 25 (48%) of Kyrene's schools. High school students go to one of two area high schools: Desert Vista High School and Mountain Pointe High School. Both schools are operated by the Tempe Union High School District.

=== Private ===
There are a number of private schools in Ahwatukee. One of the schools, Summit School of Ahwatukee, is ranked as one of the most expensive private schools in the Phoenix area by The Arizona Republic in 2014.

== Infrastructure ==
=== Transportation ===
The community is served by the ALEX neighborhood circulator, which is operated by Valley Metro Bus. Riders, however, have complained of poor service after a new contractor took over the route in 2016. Portions of Ahwatukee are also served by Valley Metro Routes 56-Priest Drive, 108-Elliot Road, 140-Ray Road, 156-Chandler Boulevard/Williams Field Road, and the I-10 East RAPID route.

As a result of having access points only via 48th Street in the northeastern part of the area, and a number of east–west crossings over I-10, Ahwatukee has been called the world's largest cul-de-sac. When Loop 202's South Mountain Freeway segment was built, the area acquired a western gateway, via a series of exits along the southern border of the community.
