= Randall Presley =

American businessman (1919–2012)

Randall Edward Presley (1919–2012) was a real estate developer who has been called "one of California's top home builders." He was responsible for developing over 160 communities in Maryland, Virginia, Illinois, New Mexico, Arizona, and California.

== Career ==
Presley was born in Pensacola in the Florida panhandle in 1919. He did "light construction work" there before moving to New York City to work as a model. During World War II he served in the United States Army Air Forces as a bombardier and a pilot. He was a flight instructor at Thunderbird Field in Glendale, Arizona next to Phoenix as well as at a base in Orange County, California. After the war he moved to Bakersfield, California and began a career as a real estate broker and later worked in construction. His first project was building 12 houses on 3 acres. In 1956 he founded the Presley Development Company (later Presley Cos.). In 1961, after his wife died, Presley married Cecilia "Cece" DeMille, the granddaughter of movie icon Cecil B. DeMille.

Seeing the rapid growth of Southern California he moved to Newport Beach in Orange County in 1963 with his family. In 1984, the Los Angeles Times said that his success was based in part on "smart land-buying strategy" and the designing of complete communities with a variety of housing and amenities including golf courses or tennis courts. At the time, the company had about 40 projects underway in California, Arizona, and New Mexico. One of his developments, the equestrian-oriented Nellie Gail Ranch in Laguna Hills, California, has been called 'the Beverly Hills of Orange County.'" In June 1969, the Presley Development Company became a publicly traded company. Another part of his success was the quality of his homes . He is quoted as saying, "What you do is set the standards and make darn sure they're followed!" A third factor was honesty in advertising. "Presley ads listed the lowest and highest price in each subdivision and included quality maps that showed where properties truly were."

In December 1984 Presley merged his company with the Pacific Lighting Company which was in San Francisco. He died at age 93 on April 12, 2012, at Hoag Hospital in Orange County from "complications arising from pneumonia."

== Philanthropy ==
Presley "funded the construction of the Cecil B. DeMille Research Room at the University of Southern California's Doheny Library in Los Angeles" in honor of his wife's grandfather. In 1985 he received the City of Hope Award, "The Spirit of Life," given by Orange County Construction Industries Alliance for the City of Hope. He contributed to many other organizations including the Sea Scouts (a Boy Scouts coed program) and the Salvation Army.

== Ahwatukee ==
One of Presley's significant projects was Ahwatukee Foothills in Arizona, "the largest and riskiest development project of Presley’s career." The project encompassed over two thousand acres of what was then farmland south of Phoenix. Originally envisioned as a golf course retirement community named "Foothill Park," the project was changed to include both retirees and young families. Ground was broken in 1972. Later 640 acres at the base of the South Mountains was added as a projected "custom home section." "At its peak in 1984, Ahwatukee houses sold at the rate of more than one a day." To attract potential buyers, in 1979 Presley built the "House of the Future," designed by the Frank LLoyd Wright Foundation featuring an early home automation system. Tours of the House were available between 1980 and 1984.
