= Lee Mallory (poet) =

American poet, editor and academic (born 1946)

- Born: March 16, 1946; San Mateo, California
- Education: University of California, Santa Barbara; University of Bordeaux; California State University, Long Beach
- Occupations: Poet; editor; retired professor
- Spouse(s): Janice Kerr-Mallory; Adell Patterson
- Children: Natalee Mallory; Misty Mallory
- Writing career
- Language: English
- Genre: Poetry
- Notable works: Now and Then; Two Sides Now
- Literary movement: Performance poetry

Lee Mallory (born March 16, 1946, in San Mateo, California) is an American poet, editor and academic best known for hosting and performing monthly poetry readings in Orange County, California, for more than 20 years.

== Early life and education ==
Growing up, Mallory lived for a time in Lebanon and Italy, as his father and stepfather were pilots and the family moved often, eventually settling in Newport Beach, California, when Mallory was a teenager. In 1964, he graduated from Newport Harbor High School.

In 1969, he obtained his bachelor's degree from the University of California, Santa Barbara, where he became acquainted with poet Kenneth Rexroth. While at UC Santa Barbara, Mallory also became friends with the late poet Charles Bukowski. From 1970–71, he attended graduate school, and taught English at the University of Bordeaux in France. He served three years in the U.S. Army, and afterward returned to Newport Beach and college and graduated with a master's degree in 1978 from California State University, Long Beach.

== Career ==
In 1980, he was hired as a full-time professor by Santa Ana College, teaching English as a second language. In the late 1980s until 2012, he co-produced monthly poetry readings in Orange County.

Mallory rose to prominence with a book of poems in a limited first edition titled I Write Your Name, which was released in 1990 by Prometheus Press. It was followed by Full Moon, Empty Hands in 1994. Critics have dubbed Mallory the "love poet" and Newport Beach's "unofficial Poet Laureate."

A collection of Mallory's correspondence, reviews and related materials to and from a variety of poets and editors are housed at the University of California, Santa Barbara Library's Special Collections archives. Other works by Mallory are being preserved at the Santa Ana College Nealley Library.

In 2012, he retired from teaching 32 years at Santa Ana College, and moved in 2013 to Las Vegas. He has performed poetry in a variety of Las Vegas venues, including casinos, bars, coffee houses and libraries, which Mallory described to the southern Nevada NPR affiliate, KNPR News, as taking his performance poetry to the streets.

A year after arriving in the Las Vegas Valley, KNPR said about Mallory, "He's reaching out into the community to perform poetry and bring it to people who may never have thought about it before. In fact, he says, he wants to be the king of poetry in Las Vegas." Las Vegas CityLife wrote, "Recently transplanted from Orange County, where he reigned over the poetry scene and coordinated readings for two decades, Lee Mallory is wasting no time in establishing himself here." And the Las Vegas Review-Journal wrote, "... he moved to Las Vegas a year ago and is trying to reinvigorate the poetry community."

In August 2017, Mallory performed with blues rock musician Lisa Mac at the "Love Wins Again Benefit Show," a fundraiser for Opportunity Village, a nonprofit organization that services people with intellectual disabilities.

=== Awards ===
In 1998, Mallory was given a Distinguished Faculty Lecturer award from Santa Ana College. The college also gave him a Professional Achievement award in 1990. In 1992, 1998, 2006 and 2010, he was given Publications awards.

== Personal life ==
Mallory and his former wife had two daughters, Natalee and Misty, the latter of whom was a fellow poet who committed suicide in 1999. She'd had an onset of mental illness and had difficulty coping with life on medication. She left a note that said she hoped her family would understand. Before her death, she was notified that a Laguna Beach publishing house would be releasing her first book of free-verse poems, which was published posthumously and edited by her father. The tragedy fueled Mallory's writing in part, he told the Los Angeles Times, because "Poetry endures." Misty's death also prompted her sister Natalee to write a suicide prevention grant for her master's dissertation at California State University, Long Beach on behalf of the Jacqueline Bogue Foundation in Orange County.

== Poetry collections ==
- Now and Then: Collected Poems by Lee Mallory, Moon Tide Press, 2009 (ISBN 978-1616581367).
- Bettin' on the Come, FarStarFire Press, 2002 (ISBN 978-1929250493).
- Two Sides Now, FarStarFire Press (co-authored with Misty Mallory), 1999 (ISBN 978-1616581367).
- Creativity and the Word, Rancho Santiago Community College District, 1998.
- Holiday Sheer, Inevitable Press, 1997.
- Full Moon, Empty Hands, Lightning Press, 1994 (ISBN 978-0963270276).
- I Write Your Name, Prometheus Press, 1990.
- 20 Times in the Same Place. An Anthology of Santa Barbara Poetry, Painted Cave Books, foreword by Kenneth Rexroth, edited by Lee Mallory, 1973.
- 91739, Water Table Press, 1971.
- Oatmeal Candy, Water Table Press, 1970.
- Beach House Poems, Malpelo Press, 1969.
