= Ruen (DJ) =

American DJ and producer

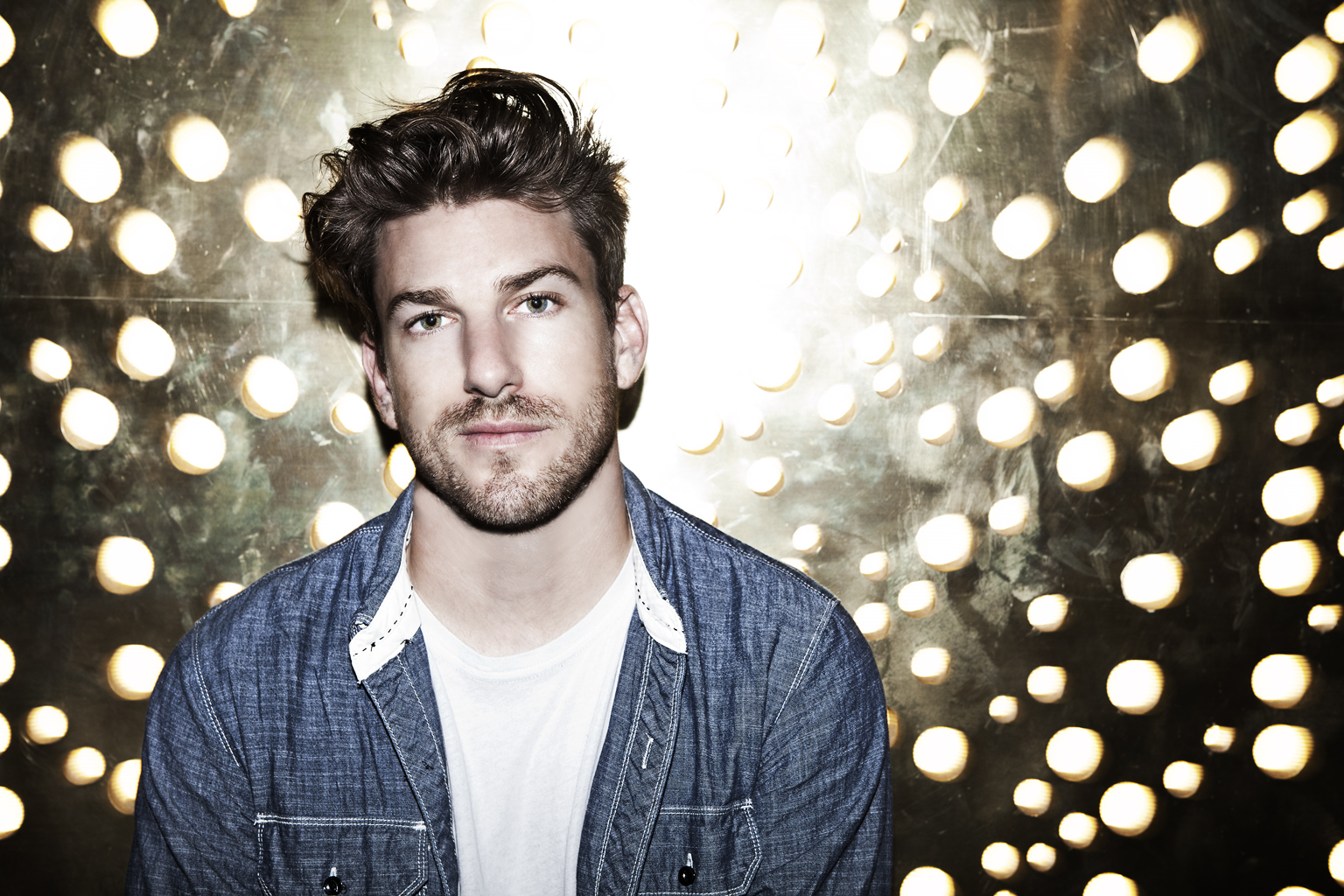

Ruen is an American DJ and producer based in Miami, Florida, United States. Born in Newport Beach, California, Ruen spent his childhood playing guitar and bass before turning to DJing Ruen moved to Miami pursuing a career as a DJ in 2003. Ruen can be seen playing weekly with the world's top artists such as Alesso, Dirty South, Diplo, Flo Rida and A-Trak. Ruen was featured in Miami Magazine as the city's top DJ and listed as one of Refinery29's 5 hottest DJs.

Ruen holds weekly residencies at LIV Nightclub and headlines the Favela Beach Party at the W Hotel's Wall Lounge. He holds multiple out-of-state residencies in New York, Los Angeles, Chicago and Boston. His worldwide bookings have taken him regularly to Dubai, London, Brazil, Zurich and more.

Ruen has been featured in articles in Elle magazine, Miami Magazine, The Miami New Times, fashion and lifestyle blog Refinery29 and trendy nightlife site UP2Night.

== Discography ==
=== Singles ===
- 2014 Jayceeoh Ruen & Mister Gray - "Scream"
- 2014- Jayceeoh Ruen & Mister Gray - "Let Em Know"
- 2014 - Ruen & Mister Gray - "Boom Boom"
- 2014 - Ruen & Mister Gray - "Trippy"
- 2014 - Ruen & Mister Gray - "Ripper"
- 2014- Ruen & Mister Gray - "Put Em Up"
- 2013 - Ruen - "Feel So High"
- 2013 - Thrillers - "Lonely Heart"
- 2013 - Ruen & Mister Gray - "Come On Baby"
- 2013 - Ruen & Mister Gray - "Get Up"
- 2013 - Thrillers Feat. Stefflon Don - "Running"
- 2013 - Thrillers Feat. Vortex & Jauht - "Put Them Up"
- 2013 - Thrillers - "Shout"
- 2013 - Ruen & Cosmo - "Party Rockin"
- 2013 - Ruen & Cosmo - "All Around"
- 2013 - Ruen, Cosmo & Damaged Goods - "Turnt Up"
- 2013 - Ruen - "Fire"
- 2013 - Ruen & Mister Gray - "Crunk in the Club"
- 2013 - Ruen & Mister Gray - "Just Go"
- 2013 - Ruen & Mister Gray - "Bombaclot"
- 2013 - Ruen & Mister Gray - "Shake That Ass"

=== Remixes ===
- 2015 - Robert Delong - "Long Way Down" (Ruen & Mister Gray Remix)
- 2014 - Lil Jon & Freaky Bass - "Rager Day" (Ruen & Mister Gray Remix)
- 2013 - Mr. Vegas - "Heads High" (Cosmo & Ruen Remix)
- 2013 - Nicky Romero - "Symphonica" (Cosmo & Ruen Remix)
- 2013 - Rocko ft. Future & Rick Ross - "U.O.E.N.O" (Ruen & Cosmo Remix)
- 2013 - Firebeatz - "Wonderful" (Cosmo & Ruen Remix)
- 2013 - Yellowclaw - "21 Bad Bitches" (Ruen & Cosmo Remix)
- 2013 - Fedde Le Grand - "Rockin' N Rollin" (Ruen & Cosmo Remix)
- 2013 - Dada Life - "Feed The Dada" (Ruen & Mister Gray Trap Remix)
- 2013 - 2 Chainz - "Birthday Song" (Ruen & Mister Gray Remix)
- 2012 - Laidback Luke & Diplo - "Hey" (Ruen & Mister Gray Trap Remix)
- 2012 - Nari & Milani - "Atom" (Ruen Trap Remix)
- 2011 - Givers - "Up Up Up" (Ruen & Ryan Evans Remix)
- 2011 - Silver City - "Hey Champ" (Ruen & Ryan Evans Remix)
- 2011 - Round Table Knights - "Say What?" (Ruen & Ryan Evans Remix)
- 2011 - The Ting Tings - "Hands" (Ruen & Ryan Evans Remix)
- 2010 - MIA - "XXXO" (Ruen & Ryan Evans Remix)

=== Podcasts ===
- 2013 - Club Killers Radio Episode 45 (Feat. Mister Gray)
- 2013 - Wantickets Podcast Mix
- 2013 - Sunday Dreamin (Feat. Ryan Evans)
