= Red Mountain High School =

School in Mesa, Maricopa County, Arizona

Location
- 7301 E. Brown Road; Mesa, Maricopa, Arizona; United States; 33°26′08″N 111°40′26″W

Information
- Type: Public
- Motto: Roar Lions, Roar; On This Mountain, We Stand As One
- Established: 1988
- Locale: City, Large (11)
- School district: Mesa Public Schools
- NCES District ID: 0404970
- CEEB code: 030221
- NCES School ID: 040497001411
- Principal: Bruce Cosseboom
- Faculty: 165.20
- Teaching staff: 166.30 (FTE)
- Grades: 9–12
- Enrollment: 3,469 (2023-2024)
  - Grade 9: 826
  - Grade 10: 845
  - Grade 11: 880
  - Grade 12: 828
- Student to teacher ratio: 20.86
- Colors: Cardinal Red and Black
- Athletics conference: 6A
- Mascot: Mountain Lion
- Rival: Mountain View High School
- Yearbook: Pinnacle
- Website: Red Mountain High School

Red Mountain High School is a public high school in Mesa, Arizona.

== History ==
Red Mountain first opened its doors in 1988 as the 4th high school built by Mesa Unified School District. It currently has student capacity of approximately 3,300 students as of the 2020–21 school year.

== Academics ==
Red Mountain's curriculum is aligned with the standards set by the Arizona Department of Education required for all students grades 9–12 graduating from a publicly funded high school.

Arizona requires that all high school students take 6 credit bearing courses during their freshmen through junior years, and provides the option for students on track for graduation the ability to reduce their course load to 4 credit bearing courses. However, Mesa Public Schools requires all students must complete 24 credits whereas the public university system controlled by the Arizona Board of Regents requires only 16 credits in the following areas:

- English - 4 credits
- Mathematics - 4 credits
- Science - 4 credits
- Social Studies - 3 credits
- Arts - 1 credit
- Career and Technical Educator/Fine Arts - 1 credit
- Physical Education - 1 credit
- Electives - 6 credits

=== Demographics ===
During the 2023–2024 school year, the demographic break of the 3,469 students enrolled was:

- Male - 50.7%
- Female - 49.3%
- American Indian/Alaska Native - 1.3%
- Asian - 1.6%
- Black - 3.4%
- Hispanic - 28.6%
- Native Hawaiian/Pacific Islander - 0.6%
- White - 60.7%
- Multiracial - 3.8%

=== Accolades ===
In the 1994–95 and 1995-96 school years, it was honored as a Blue Ribbon school. RMHS received the 2014 A+ School Award under the direction of Dr. Gerald Slemmer, principal (2004–2014). They received the award again in 2018 under Mr. Jared Ryan, principal (2014–2019).

== Athletics ==
Red Mountain is an Arizona Interscholastic Association (AIA) member school offering boys and girls sports adhering to Mesa Unified School District's Title IX compliance. Student athletes can participate in varsity, junior varsity, and freshmen only teams as well as individual sports under the AIA's 6A Conference. Red Mountain Athletics consist of these sports:

- Badminton (Girls)‡
- Baseball
- Basketball (Boys and Girls)
- Beach Volleyball (Boys and Girls)‡
- Cheer (Girls and Coed)
- Cross Country (Boys and Girls)†
- Esports†‡
- Flag football
- Football
- Golf (Boys and Girls)†
- Lacrosse (Boys and Girls)
- Pomline
- Soccer (Boys and Girls)
- Softball
- Swim and Dive (Boys and Girls)†
- Tennis (Boys and Girls)‡
- Track and field (Boys and Girls)†
- Volleyball (Boys and Girls)‡
- Wrestling (Boys and Girls)
- † denotes individual and team sports
- ‡ denotes individual, doubles, and team sports

Each sport is funded by the school, yet additional funds are raised through boosters creating 501(c)(3) non-profit organization, donations, and tax credits.

State Champions
Sport	Years	Notes
Basketball - Girls	2007	
Cheer	2020, 2024	
Cross Country - Girls	1991	
Football	2000, 2001	
Golf - Boys	1995, 1996, 1997, 1998, 2000, 2001, 2002, 2010, 2013	
Softball	2006, 2010, 2011, 2012, 2013*, 2014	* National Champions
Tennis - Girls	2005	
Track - Girls	1992, 1996	
Wrestling	1994	

== Notable alumni ==
- Vance Wilson (1991) – MLB player and coach
- Brian Jennings (1994) – NFL player
- Lennox Gordon (1996) – NFL player
- Charlie Beljan (2003) – PGA Tour golfer
- Nick Miller (2005) - NFL player
- Kayla Pedersen (2007) – WNBA player
- Jaiden Dittfach (2014) – YouTuber
- Evan Svoboda (2021) – Wyoming Cowboys quarterback
- Ja'Kobi Lane (2023) – USC Trojans wide receiver
