= Geronimo Park =

Former baseball park in Pinal County, Arizona

- Interactive map of Geronimo Park
- Location: Apache Junction, Arizona
- Coordinates: 33.40137°N 111.54967°W
- Owner: Lost Dutchman's Baseball Association (1961–1969); Mesa Public Schools (1969)
- Operator: Houston Colt .45s
- Capacity: 5,000
- Type: Baseball park
- Surface: Natural grass

Construction
- Built: 1961
- Opened: 5 December 1961
- Closed: 16 March 1963
- Demolished: 1969
- Cost: $150,000
- General contractors: PG & R Engineering, Inc.

Tenant
- Houston Colt .45s (MLB/spring training) 1962–1963

Geronimo Park was a shortlived baseball park in Apache Junction, Arizona, that was in use from 1962 until 1963. It lay vacant from 1963 until it was dismantled in 1969 after being sold to Mesa Public Schools. Its location is currently occupied by a lodge of the Loyal Order of Moose. With a view of Superstition Mountains, it was the first spring training ball park of the Houston Colt .45s.

== History ==
=== Planning and construction ===
Geronimo Park was constructed on a 12-acre plot of desert land near what is now the Superstition Freeway in Apache Junction. Despite there being little in unincorporated Apache Junction, the Superstition Ho Hotel was opened in September 1960 in an effort to capitalize on the nearby Apacheland Studio movie ranch. Developer William W. Creighton, with financial backing from owners of the hotel, made promotional guarantees to team ownership which eventually resulted in an agreement for the Houston team to make Apache Junction their home for spring training. Following a "Name the Park" contest, the name was nominated by Victoria Vala of Riverside, Illinois, and was selected as the official name on January 19, 1962, after the ballpark's opening.

=== Opening and use ===
The first game at Geronimo Park featured one of Houston's two Arizona Instructional League team, the Colt .22s which featured players with no previous professional experience, and the San Francisco Giants on December 5, 1961. Houston lost by a score of 5–3. The Giants also beat Houston in the stadium's official Cactus League game on March 12, 1962, by a score of 6–1, in front of 2,488 fans.

Upon first arriving at the ball park, players complained of being unable to properly track baseballs, as the flat desert environment lacked landmarks to see the dimensions of the horizon. It was reported that pitcher Turk Farrell hiked regularly from the Superstition Ho Hotel to Geronimo Park, and carried a .22 caliber pistol as he trekked across a vacant field of cactus and sagebrush, shooting snakes and beer cans as he made his way.

The park's remote location caused low attendance. The first game at the ballpark was remembered as a "near sellout," but most games drew fewer than 1,000 people by 1963. At the time, Apache Junction was a long drive down a two-lane road from the populated parts of Phoenix, and only had a bar, a bank, and a restaurant in addition to the hotel and ballpark, giving Houston fans little incentive to come follow their team during spring training. By 1963, general manager Paul Richards had started looking for Florida sites. The Colt .45s moved to Cocoa Beach, Florida, and rebranded that offseason to the Houston Astros.

After the Colt .45s left in 1963, the stadium's bleachers were removed and sold to local high schools, and the Moose Lodge bought the clubhouse.
