= Nick Miller (American football) =

American football player (born 1987)

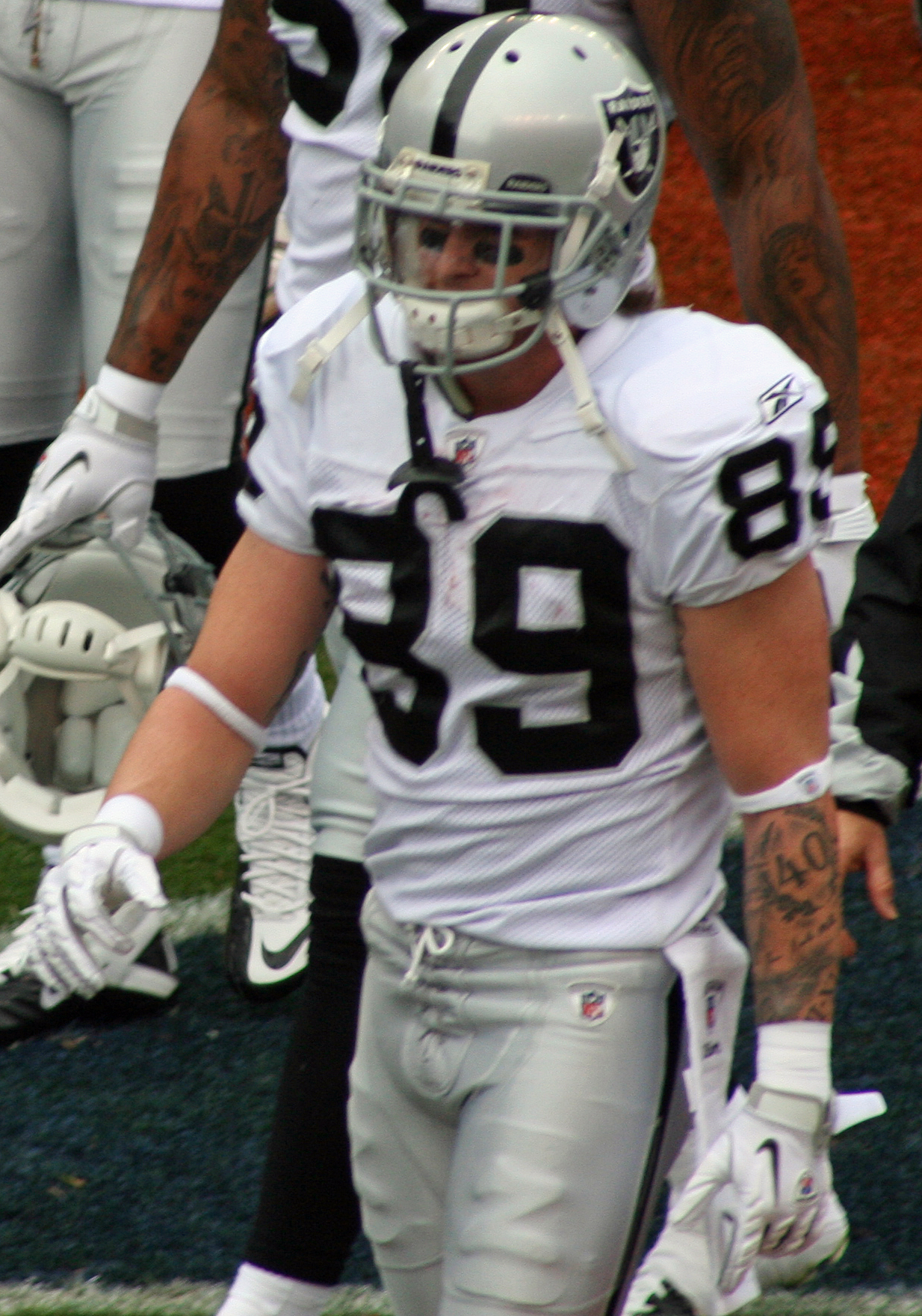
- Miller with the Raiders in October 2010

No. 17, 89
- Position: Wide receiver

Personal information
- Born: March 29, 1987 (age 39); Mesa, Arizona, U.S.
- Listed height: 5 ft 9 in (1.75 m)
- Listed weight: 180 lb (82 kg)

Career information
- High school: Red Mountain (Mesa)
- College: Southern Utah
- NFL draft: 2009: undrafted

Career history
- Oakland Raiders (2009−2011); St. Louis Rams (2011); Philadelphia Eagles (2013)*; Arizona Rattlers (2014)
- * Offseason or practice squad member only

Awards and highlights
- GWC Special Teams P.O.Y. (2008)

Career NFL statistics
- Receptions: 4
- Receiving yards: 48
- Return yards: 545
- Total touchdowns: 1
- Stats at Pro Football Reference

Career AFL statistics
- Receptions: 21
- Receiving yards: 236
- Receiving touchdowns: 7
- Return attempts: 25
- Return yards: 520
- Stats at ArenaFan.com

Nickelous Miller (born March 29, 1987) is an American former professional football player who was a wide receiver in the National Football League (NFL). He was signed by the Oakland Raiders as an undrafted free agent in 2009. He played college football for the Southern Utah Thunderbirds.

Miller also played for the St. Louis Rams and Arizona Rattlers.

== Early life ==
Miller played high school football at Red Mountain High School in Mesa, Arizona. He was a 1st Team All-Region wide receiver; and a 2nd Team All-State honoree and 1st Team All-Tribune selection at defensive back. Miller recorded up 656 receiving yards and eight touchdowns during his senior season. He also intercepted five passes and helped his team to an East Valley region championship.

Miller also lettered in baseball and track.

== College career ==
After transferring from Scottsdale Community College, Miller became a starting wide receiver at Southern Utah University in 2007. He set an SUU record with 41 kickoff returns for 914 yards. He also finished second on the team in receptions and receiving yards, with 35 catches for 435 yards and a touchdown. In addition to the 19 carries he had for 50 yards, he also led the team with 19 punt returns for 175 yards.

As a senior in 2008, Miller was named Great West Conference Special Teams Players of the Year and caught 55 passes for 763 yards and three touchdowns.

== Professional career ==
=== Oakland Raiders ===
Miller went undrafted in the 2009 NFL draft, but was signed by the Oakland Raiders as an undrafted free agent. He survived final cuts on September 5 and made Oakland's 53-man roster. However, he never played during his rookie season because of a shin injury. On December 30, Miller was placed on injured reserve with the shin injury.

On October 10, 2010, Miller made his official NFL debut, returning a punt 46 yards in the third quarter of the Raiders' 35-27 win over the San Diego Chargers. On October 24, 2010 Nick Miller made a 32-yard catch along the sideline for his first career catch. On October 1, 2011, Miller was released by the Raiders.

=== St. Louis Rams ===
The St. Louis Rams signed Miller on October 6, 2011. He was waived on October 22, but re-signed on November 25, 2011. On Oct. 27, Miller returned a punt 88 yards against the Arizona Cardinals for his first career touchdown in the NFL. The punt return was the longest in Rams' history since 1994. He was released on March 12, 2012.

=== Philadelphia Eagles ===
On January 8, 2013, Miller was signed by the Philadelphia Eagles. On July 24, 2013, Miller was released by the Philadelphia Eagles. On July 30, 2013, Miller was re-signed by the Philadelphia Eagles to take the roster spot of Jeremy Maclin, who was placed on injured reserve after tearing his ACL. On August 25, 2013, Miller was released by the Eagles.

=== Arizona Rattlers ===
On November 15, 2013, Miller was assigned to the Arizona Rattlers of the Arena Football League. Miller was the Rattlers kick returner as well as working in at wide receiver. After 10 games, Miller was placed on injured reserve and ultimately reassigned by the Rattlers after an off the field health incident.
