= MDLP =

MDLP is an acronym standing for:

- MiniDisc Long-Play, a method for doubling or quadrupling the amount of audio that a MiniDisc can hold, using ATRAC3 compression
- Mesa Distance Learning Program, a distance learning program based in Mesa, Arizona.
- Minimum description length principle
