= Mountain View High School (Mesa, Arizona) =

School in Mesa, Arizona, US

- "Campus of Champions"

Location
- 2700 East Brown Road; Mesa, Arizona 85213; United States; 33°26′20″N 111°46′20″W

Information
- Type: Public secondary (U.S.)
- Motto: Go Forth With Pride
- Established: 1976
- NCES District ID: 0404970
- Oversight: Mesa Public Schools
- NCES School ID: 040497000406
- Principal: Mike Oliver
- Staff: 157.40 (FTE)
- Grades: 9–12
- Enrollment: 3,391 (2023–2024)
- Student to teacher ratio: 21.54
- Campus: Suburban
- Colors: Scarlet & Blue
- Mascot: Toro
- Website: mtnview.mpsaz.org

Mountain View High School is a high school in Mesa, Arizona. It was established in 1976, the third public high school in Mesa. It is known for its numerous athletic and academic accomplishments. The school's mascot is a Toro. Known as the Campus of Champions. The Toro Spiritline has won many state and national titles. In the 1984–85 school year, it was honored as a Blue Ribbon school.

Mountain View was named a silver medal school by U.S. News & World Report.

== Athletics ==
Mountain View was included on Sports Illustrated's 2005 list of Top 25 High School Athletic Programs in the Nation:

Though the school hasn't been around for long, Mountain View has quickly established itself as king of the hill in Arizona. In the last decade the Toros have produced scores of top athletes, including Todd Heap and John Beck (Washington Commanders), Shea Hillenbrand (Toronto Blue Jays) and Max Hall (Arizona Cardinals). More stars are on the horizon: Mountain View has had 15 scholarship athletes in each of the last two years. And over the last 10 years, the Toros have won 21 state championships in 10 sports, including football (four), boys' track (four), boys' basketball (three), girls' track (three), spiritline (6+), and boys' and girls' cross-country, girls' swimming, girls' volleyball, girls' basketball, wrestling and baseball (one each).

Sports Illustrated later listed Mountain View as the top athletic high school in Arizona.

== Academics ==
In 2007, the Siemens Foundation recognized Mountain View as having the top Advanced Placement program in Arizona.

=== Academic Decathlon ===
Mountain View High School has accomplished 61 state championships (the most in Arizona Academic Decathlon history) and four state championship winning streaks since 1990. Each streak has lasted for at least two years (5, 2, 4 and 2 respectively). In addition, the team has broken the 50,000 barriers three times. Mountain View has finished second at the national USAD competition on five occasions (1992, 1994, 2004, 2005, 2010).

== Demographics ==
During the 2023–2024 school year, the demographic break of the 3,391 students enrolled was:

- Male - 51.3%
- Female 48.7%
- Native American/Alaskan - 4%
- Asian - 1.1%
- Black - 3.2%
- Hispanic - 30.1%
- Native Hawaiian/Pacific Islander - 0.6%
- White - 58.2%
- Multiracial - 2.8%

== Feeder schools ==
Junior high schools that feed into Mountain View High School (and the elementary schools that feed into the junior high schools)

(Note: Some elementary schools feed into more than one junior high)

Kino Junior High School:

- Thomas Edison Elementary School
- Dwight D. Eisenhower Center for Innovation
- Oliver Wendell Holmes Elementary School
- John Kerr Elementary School
- Lehi Elementary School
- Abraham Lincoln Elementary School
- James Lowell Elementary School

Charles D. Poston Junior High School:

- Marjorie Entz Elementary School
- Eugene Field Elementary
- Nathan Hale Elementary School
- Michael Hughes Elementary
- Highland Arts Elementary School
- Henry Longfellow Elementary School

O. S. Stapley Junior High School:

- Barbara Bush Elementary School
- Marjorie Entz Elementary School
- Nathan Hale Elementary School
- Lehi Elementary School
- Hermosa Vista Elementary School
- Zedo Ishikawa Elementary School
- Douglas MacArthur Elementary School

== Notable alumni ==
- Kirk Adams, former member of the Arizona House of Representatives
- Jim Adkins, lead singer for Jimmy Eat World
- Brian Banks, MLB baseball player
- John Beck, NFL football coach and former player
- Devin Clark, NFL football player
- Joe Germaine, NFL & AFL football player
- Max Hall, NFL football player
- Kurt Haws, NFL football player
- Todd Heap, NFL football player
- Shea Hillenbrand, MLB baseball player
- Curtis Hodges, NFL football player
- Jamar Hunt, NFL football player
- Tommy Kuhse, basketball player
- Breeja Larson, 2012 Olympic swimmer
- Scott Lydy, MLB player
- Brad Mills, MLB baseball player
- D. Nathan Sheets, economist and U.S. Department of the Treasury official
- Todd Shell, NFL football player
- April Steiner, Olympic pole vaulter
