= Lennox Gordon =

American football player (born 1978)

No. 31, 30
- Position: Running back

Personal information
- Born: April 9, 1978 (age 48); Higley, Arizona, U.S.
- Listed height: 5 ft 11 in (1.80 m)
- Listed weight: 201 lb (91 kg)

Career information
- High school: Red Mountain (Mesa, Arizona)
- College: New Mexico (1995–1998)
- NFL draft: 1999: undrafted

Career history
- Buffalo Bills (1999); Indianapolis Colts (2000)

Career NFL statistics
- Rushing yards: 51
- Rushing average: 3.4
- Stats at Pro Football Reference

Lennox Constantine Gordon (born April 9, 1978) is an American former professional football running back who played two seasons in the National Football League (NFL) with the Buffalo Bills and Indianapolis Colts. He played college football at the University of New Mexico.

== Early life and college ==
Lennox Constantine Gordon was born on April 9, 1978, in Higley, Arizona. He attended Red Mountain High School in Mesa, Arizona.

Gordon was a four-year letterman for the New Mexico Lobos of the University of New Mexico from 1995 to 1998. He rushed 15 times for 58 yards in 1995 while also catching one pass for three yards. As a sophomore in 1996, he recorded 196 carries for 1,008 yards and nine touchdowns, and 22 receptions for 155 yards. In 1997, Gordon totaed 111 rushing attempts for 494 yards and four touchdowns, and 11 catches for 39 yards. As a senior in 1998, he rushed 130 times for 571 yards and four touchdowns while catching 15 passes for 69 yards and one touchdown.

== Professional career ==
Gordon signed with the Buffalo Bills on April 23, 1999. He was released on September 5, signed to the practice squad on September 7, and promoted to the active roster on October 26, 1999. He played in eight games for the Bills during the 1999 season, recording 11 rushes for 38 yards and two touchdowns, three solo tackles, and one assisted tackle. Gordon also appeared in a playoff game that year. He was released by the Bills on August 27, 2000.

Gordon was signed to the practice squad of the Indianapolis Colts on August 29, 2000. He was released on September 6, signed to the practice squad on September 13, and promoted to the active roster on September 27, 2000. Overall, he played in nine games for the Colts that season, rushing four times for 13 and one touchdown while also posting one solo tackle. Gordon also appeared in one playoff game. He was released on July 18, 2001.
