= Anderson Hernández =

Dominican baseball player (born 1982)

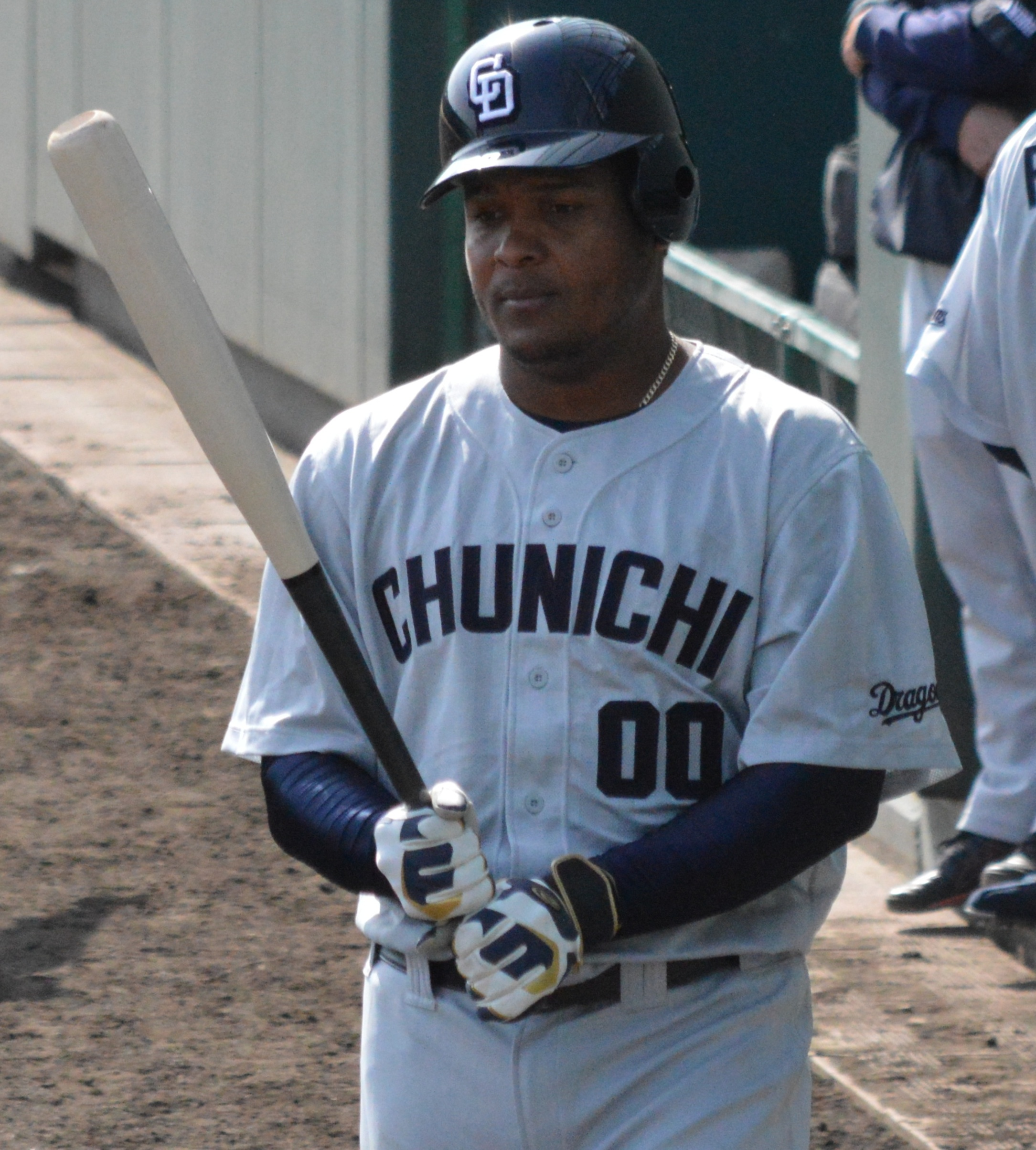
- Hernandez with the Chunichi Dragons in 2015

Bravos de León
- Second baseman / Shortstop / Coach
- Born: October 30, 1982 (age 43); Santo Domingo, Dominican Republic
- Batted: Switch Threw: Right

Professional debut
- MLB: September 18, 2005, for the New York Mets
- NPB: March 28, 2014, for the Chunichi Dragons

Last appearance
- MLB: October 2, 2010, for the Houston Astros
- NPB: September 28, 2016, for the Chunichi Dragons

MLB statistics
- Batting average: .241
- Home runs: 4
- Runs batted in: 60

NPB statistics
- Batting average: .263
- Home runs: 21
- Runs batted in: 116
- Stats at Baseball Reference

Teams
- New York Mets (2005–2007); Washington Nationals (2008–2009); New York Mets (2009); Cleveland Indians (2010); Houston Astros (2010); Chunichi Dragons (2014–2016)

Anderson Hernández Mejia (born October 30, 1982) is a Dominican former professional baseball infielder who currently serves as the third base coach and infield coach for the Bravos de León of the Mexican League. He played in Major League Baseball (MLB) for the New York Mets, Washington Nationals, Cleveland Indians, and Houston Astros, and in Nippon Professional Baseball (NPB) for the Chunichi Dragons.

== Professional career ==
=== Detroit Tigers ===
Hernández was signed as an undrafted free agent at age 18 by the Detroit Tigers in 2001. In the minor leagues, Hernández showed poor patience and high strikeouts typical of a teenager and did not rise past single-A until 2004. In his first season, he batted .264/.303/.389 with 34 stolen bases in just 216 at-bats. However, Hernández progressed slowly. In 2002, playing in High-A ball, he showed poor hitting skills, batting just .259/.310/.339. The next season was even worse. Hernández struggled to hit above the Mendoza Line, (.229/.278/.295) and stole just 15 bases. But the next season started off well for him. After batting .295 with 11 RBI in about 100 AB, Hernández was called up to the Double-A Erie SeaWolves where he batted .274 with 5 home runs, 29 RBI, and 17 stolen bases. In January 2005, Hernández was traded to the New York Mets for catcher Vance Wilson.

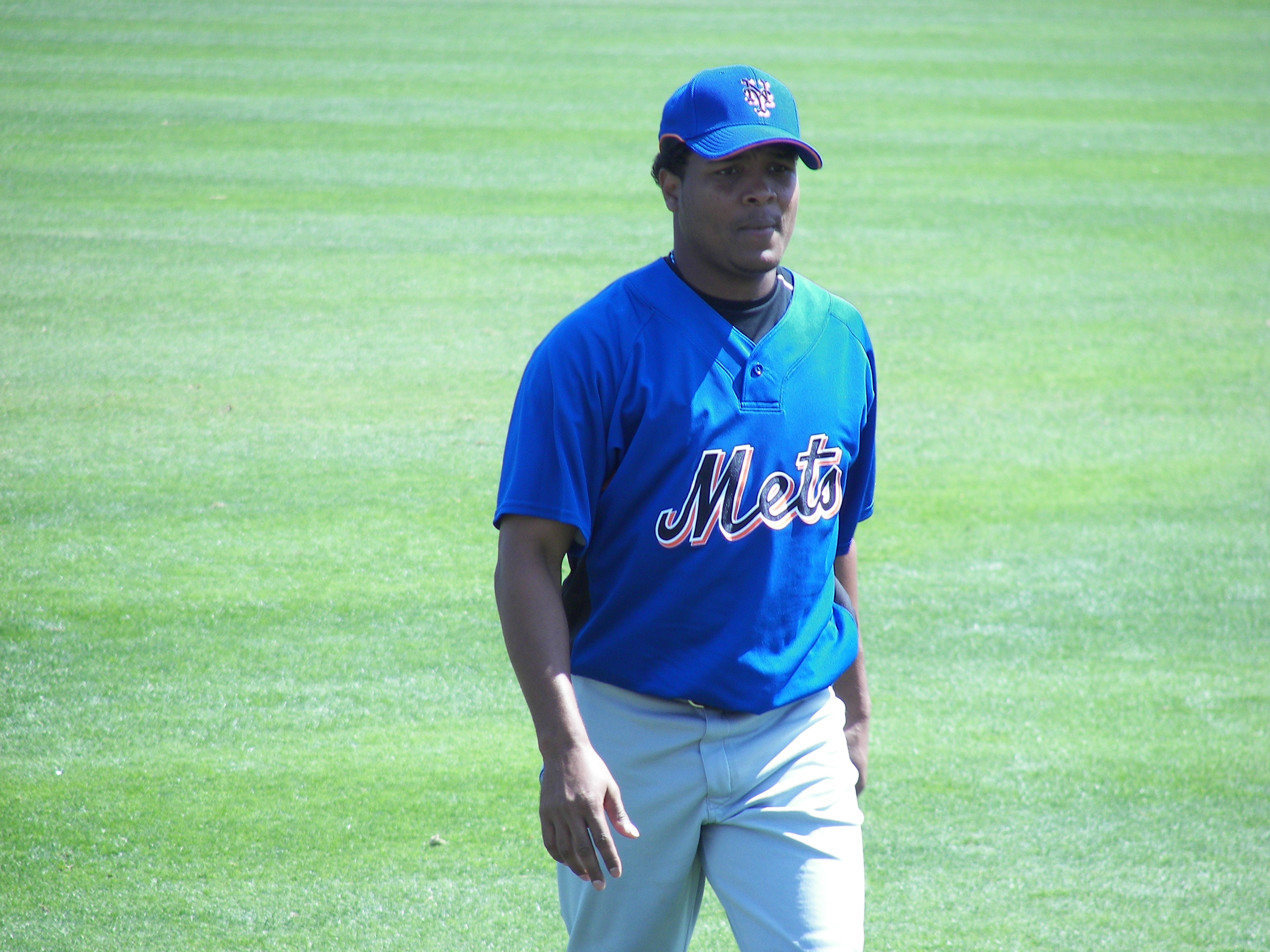
Hernández before a Mets spring training game in 2007.

=== New York Mets ===
In January 2005, Hernández was traded to the New York Mets for catcher Vance Wilson. With the Mets out of playoff contention in 2005 and Hernández hitting over .300 in both Double-A and Triple-A, he was called up to the majors in mid-September but went 0-for-14 before finally getting his first hit, off Colorado Rockies pitcher Aaron Cook, in the last game of the season, going 1–4. Due to the knee injury of Kazuo Matsui, Hernández was the starting second baseman for the Mets to start the 2006 season, but he too was soon injured and placed on the 15-day DL. He returned later in the season and hit his first Major League home run on September 19, 2006, off Florida Marlins pitcher Scott Olsen. He is widely known to Mets fans for pinch-running for Paul LoDuca in the bottom of the ninth inning in Game 7 of the 2006 NLCS against the St. Louis Cardinals, representing the winning run with two out, but Carlos Beltrán struck out to end the game. In 2007, he made many appearances as a pinch-runner or a late inning defensive replacement, as he only collected three at-bats and went 1–3. On August 20, 2008, Hernández was dealt to the Washington Nationals as a player to be named later for relief pitcher Luis Ayala.

=== Washington Nationals ===
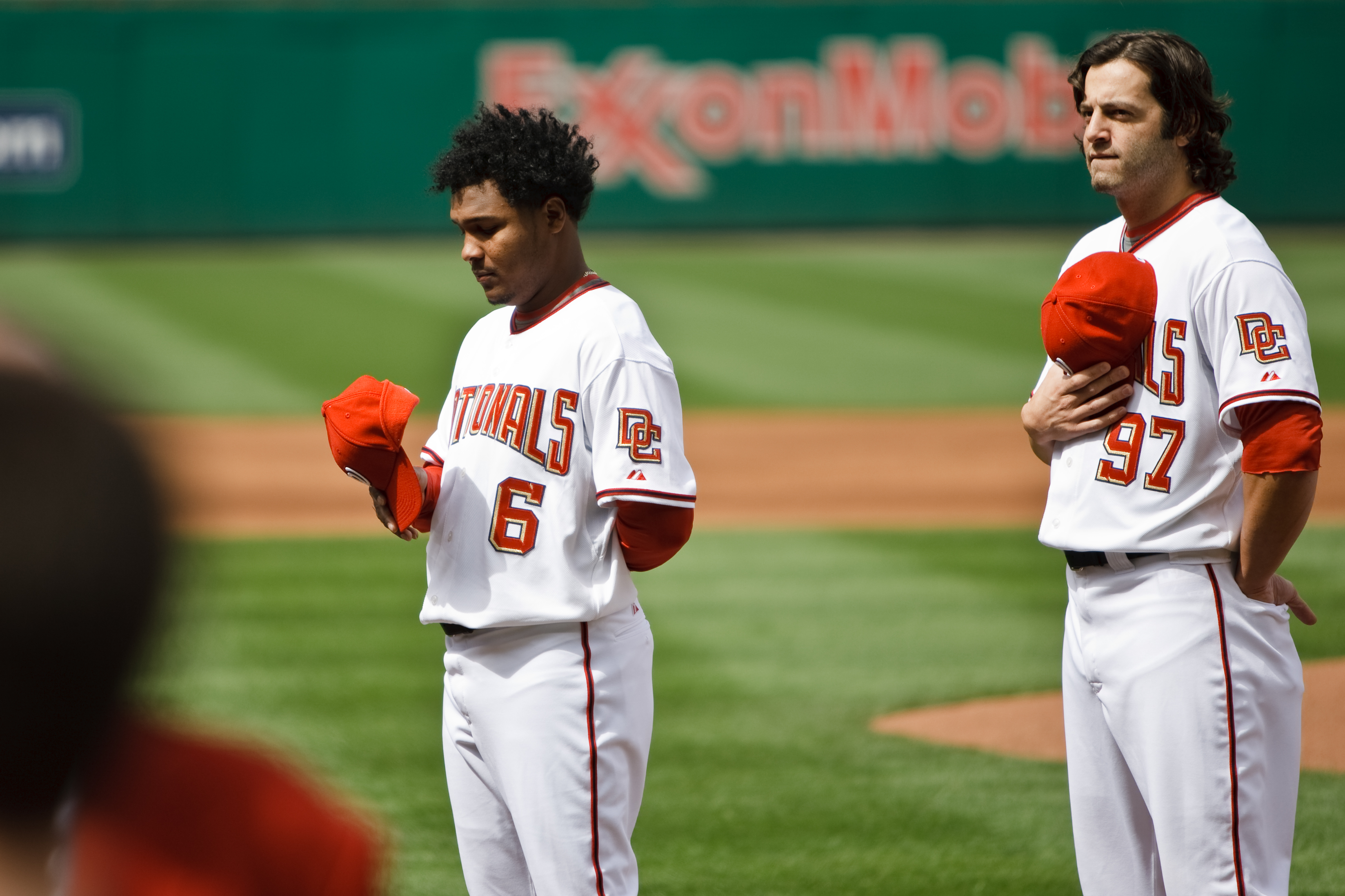
Hernández (left) before the Nationals home opener in 2009.

On August 20, 2008, Hernández was dealt to the Washington Nationals as a player to be named later for relief pitcher Luis Ayala. He was the starter at second for the Nationals. On August 6, 2009, Hernández was traded back to the Mets for minor league infielder Greg Veloz.

=== New York Mets (second stint) ===
Hernández was traded back to the New York Mets on August 6, 2009, in exchange for minor league infielder Greg Veloz. On March 17, 2010, Hernández was claimed off waivers by the Cleveland Indians.

=== Cleveland Indians ===
On March 17, 2010, Hernández was claimed off waivers by the Cleveland Indians. He was assigned to Triple-A Columbus on April 8. On June 8, 2010, the Indians purchased Hernández's contract and placed him on the active roster. Hernández had the opportunity to compete for the starting second baseman position, but lost to Jayson Nix; he was subsequently used in a utility infielder role. On July 18, Hernández was designated for assignment to make room on the active roster for pitcher Jeanmar Gómez.

=== Houston Astros ===
Hernández was claimed off waivers by the Houston Astros on July 21, 2010. He was added to their active roster the following day. In 32 games for the Astros, Hernández batted .188/.304/.229 with no home runs, one RBI, and two stolen bases. On October 14, Hernández was removed from the 40-man roster and sent outright to the Triple-A Round Rock Express. He elected free agency on November 7.

On November 12, 2010, Hernández re-signed with the Astros organization on a minor league contract.

=== Pittsburgh Pirates ===
Hernández signed a minor league contract with the Pittsburgh Pirates on December 21, 2011. In November 2012, Hernández re-signed with the Pirates.

=== Dominican Republic ===
Hernández played in his native country, the Dominican Republic, for Tigres del Licey. He won the Rookie of the Year in the regular season and also the MVP during the finals. Hernández and shortstop Erick Aybar are called "los menores" (Spanish for "the kids") and were known as one of the best middle infields in the Dominican Republic.

=== Chunichi Dragons ===
On December 12, 2013, Hernández was unveiled by the Chunichi Dragons in the NPB as a new signing ahead of their 2014 campaign.

On October 29, 2016, it was confirmed that Hernández would be released from the Dragons along with Ricardo Nanita, Juan Jaime, Drew Naylor and Leyson Septimo.

=== Vaqueros Unión Laguna ===
On April 10, 2017, Hernández signed with the Vaqueros Unión Laguna of the Mexican League. He made 109 appearances for Unión Laguna, slashing .309/.359/.449 with five home runs, 68 RBI, and nine stolen bases.

=== Tecolotes de los Dos Laredos ===
On February 9, 2018, Hernández was traded to the Tecolotes de los Dos Laredos of the Mexican League. He made 23 appearances for Dos Laredos, hitting .307/.395/.440 with two home runs, 14 RBI, and three stolen bases. Hernández was released by the Tecolotes on May 1.

=== Olmecas de Tabasco ===
On July 3, 2018, Hernández signed with the Olmecas de Tabasco of the Mexican League. He made 55 appearances for Tabasco, batting .276/.323/.355 with one home run, 19 RBI, and four stolen bases. Hernández became a free agent following the season.

== Coaching career ==
On August 10, 2024, Hernández was announced as the first base coach for the Dominican Republic national baseball team in the 2024 WBSC Premier12.

Hernández joined the Leones de Yucatán as the team's third base coach for the 2025 season. On May 26, 2025, Hernández was fired by Yucatán.

On December 17, 2025, the Bravos de León of the Mexican League hired Hernández to serve as the team's third base coach and infield coach.
