= Vance Wilson =

American baseball player & coach (born 1973)

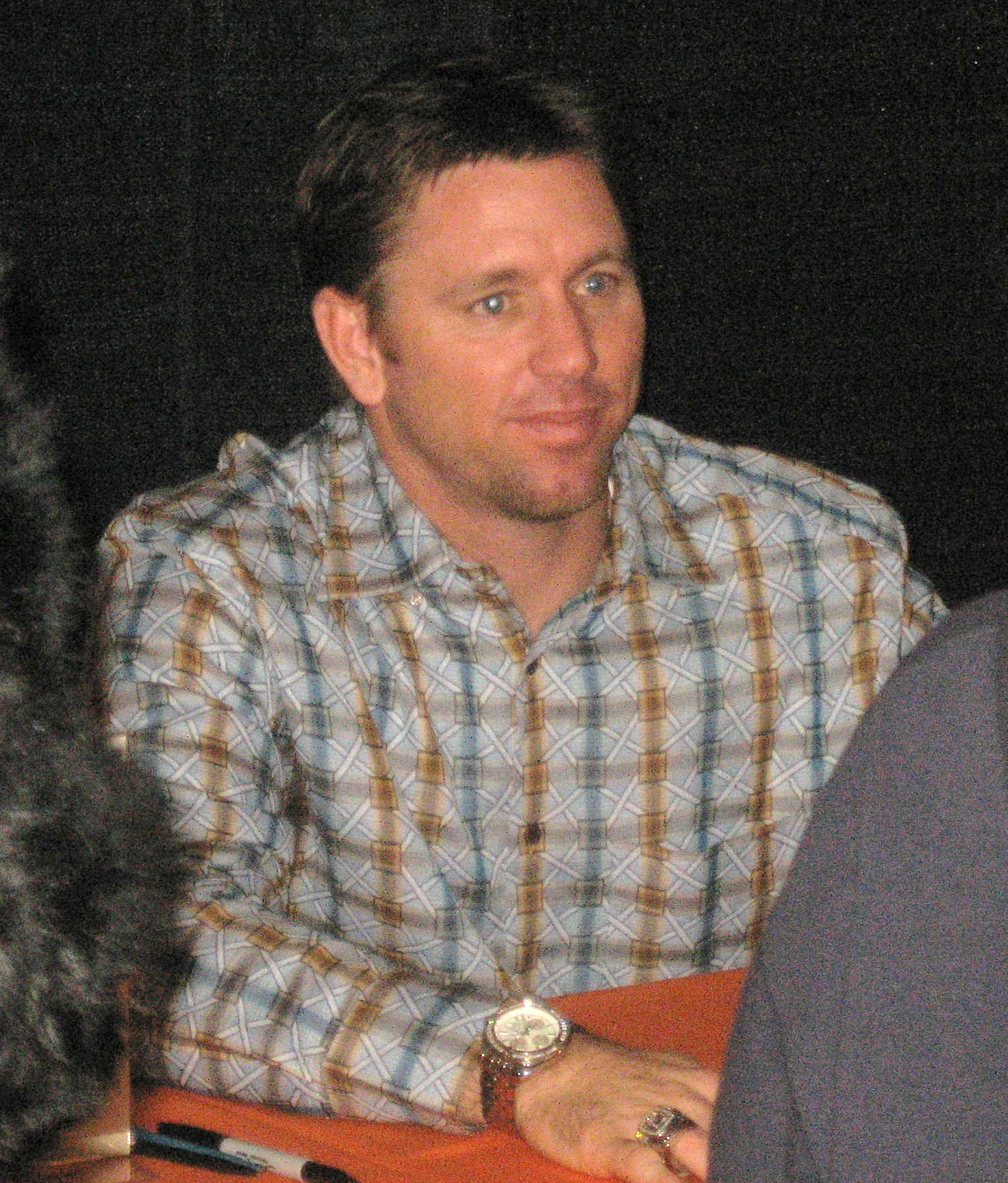

Kansas City Royals – No. 17
- Catcher / Coach
- Born: March 17, 1973 (age 52); Mesa, Arizona, U.S.
- Batted: Right Threw: Right

MLB debut
- April 24, 1999, for the New York Mets

Last MLB appearance
- September 28, 2006, for the Detroit Tigers

MLB statistics
- Batting average: .250
- Home runs: 25
- Runs batted in: 129
- Stats at Baseball Reference

Teams
- As player: New York Mets (1999–2004); Detroit Tigers (2005–2006); As coach: Kansas City Royals (2018–present)

Vance Allen Wilson (born March 17, 1973) is an American former professional baseball catcher and current coach. He is the third base coach for the Kansas City Royals of Major League Baseball (MLB). He played all or parts of eight seasons in MLB. Listed at 5'11" tall and 215 pounds, he batted and threw right-handed during his career.

== Amateur career ==
Wilson was a high school standout at Red Mountain High School in Arizona, and continued his hometown success at Mesa Community College, where he was tagged as a Junior College All-American in 1994.

== Professional career ==
=== New York Mets ===
The New York Mets selected Wilson in the 44th round of the 1993 Major League Baseball draft, and the catcher signed with the team the following summer after finishing his college career.

After five arduous and injury riddled seasons in the Mets minor-league system, Wilson made his major-league debut on April 24, 1999, as a defensive replacement against the Chicago Cubs. Wilson's immediate tenure in New York was short-lived however, and he began the 2000 and 2001 seasons with Triple-A Norfolk.

Wilson finally began to play regularly with the Mets in late 2001, assuming the role of back-up catcher behind perennial National League All-Star Mike Piazza. Used as a pinch hitter and occasional spot-starter, Wilson's greatest value to the Mets was as a defensive replacement who could prevent runners from stealing bases (something Piazza struggled with). From 2001-04, Wilson ranked amongst the top three National League catchers for lowest opposing stolen base percentage.

The reserve catcher appeared in a career-high 96 games for the Mets in 2003, notching career-highs of 8 home runs and 39 RBI. However, Wilson was hampered by injuries towards the end of the 2004 season, and the Mets dealt him to the Detroit Tigers on January 5, 2005, for second baseman Anderson Hernández.

=== Detroit Tigers ===
In Detroit, Wilson once again found himself behind another perennial All-Star, this time backing up Iván Rodríguez. During the latter half of 2005, Wilson had a short starting stint, calling 22 games for the Tigers with Rodríguez on the disabled list and ineligible list.

He started 2006 on the bench as the Tigers began the race for the American League crown. During the summer, he signed a two-year extension with the Tigers.

In 2007, he tore a muscle in his right forearm during the last week of spring training and was expected to be on the disabled list for the first half of the season. He reinjured his arm in early June during a rehab assignment. It required Tommy John surgery, ending his season. Minor leaguer Mike Rabelo replaced Wilson as the back-up catcher.

Wilson was expected to be ready for the 2008 season. However, Wilson suffered yet another injury during his rehabilitation during the winter months. He suffered from Plantar fasciitis, which is an inflammation in the ligament that connects the heel bone to the toes. After Rodriguez was traded to the New York Yankees, utility player Brandon Inge took over as the team's starting catcher in Wilson's absence. Rabelo was traded to the Florida Marlins, leaving the backup catching duties to Dane Sardinha.

Wilson filed for free agency on October 31, 2008.

=== Kansas City Royals ===
On January 7, 2009, Wilson signed a minor-league contract with the Kansas City Royals.

On April 1, 2010, Wilson opted out of his minor-league deal with the Royals and chose to retire.

== Coaching career ==
On October 29, 2010, Wilson was named the 13th manager of the Kane County Cougars, the Kansas City Royals' Class A Midwest League affiliate. In 2011, Wilson's rookie season as manager, Wilson piloted the Cougars to a 37-33 overall record and third-place finish in the division, which qualified the Cougars for participation in Midwest League's playoffs.

Before the 2012 season, Wilson was named manager of the Wilmington Blue Rocks of the Carolina League. On November 1, 2013 the Royals promoted Wilson to manager of the Northwest Arkansas Naturals (Texas).

Wilson was the Royals bullpen coach in 2018 and 2019. He became the Royals third base coach prior to the 2020 season.
