= Ricardo Nanita =

Dominican baseball player (born 1981)

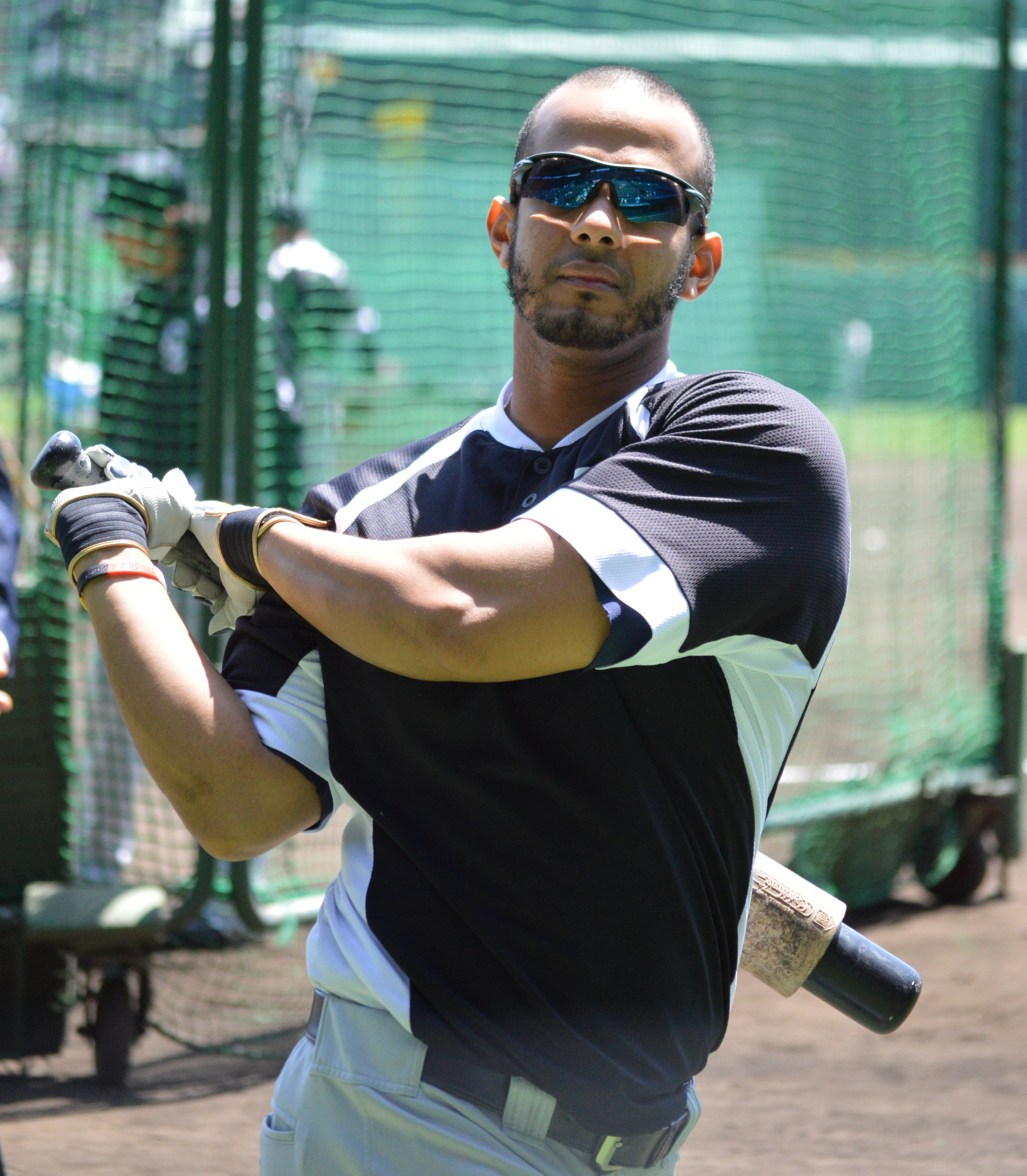
- Nanita with the Chunichi Dragons
- Outfielder
- Born: June 12, 1981 (age 45); Santo Domingo, Dominican Republic
- Batted: Left Threw: Left

NPB debut
- March 27, 2015, for the Chunichi Dragons

Last NPB appearance
- August 13, 2016, for the Chunichi Dragons

NPB statistics
- Batting average: .293
- Home runs: 8
- Runs batted in: 50
- Stats at Baseball Reference

Teams
- Chunichi Dragons (2015–2016)
Medals
Men's baseball
Representing Dominican Republic
World Baseball Classic
Gold medal – first place	2013 San Francisco	Team
Central American and Caribbean Games
Gold medal – first place	2010 Mayagüez	Team

Ricardo Michael Nanita (born June 12, 1981) is a Dominican former professional baseball outfielder. He played in Nippon Professional Baseball (NPB) for the Chunichi Dragons, and for the Dominican Republic national baseball team.

== Amateur career ==
Nanita attended Chipola College, and then transferred to Florida International University (FIU), where he played college baseball for the FIU Panthers baseball team.

== Professional career ==
=== Chicago White Sox ===
The Chicago White Sox drafted Nanita in the 14th round of the 2003 Major League Baseball draft.

Nanita spent his first season in the minors with White Sox affiliate Great Falls in the Pioneer League registering a .384 batting average with 37 RBI in 212 plate appearances.

=== Toronto Blue Jays ===
Nanita played for the Toronto Blue Jays Triple-A affiliate Las Vegas 51s in the 2011 and 2012 seasons. The Blue Jays invited him to spring training in 2013.

Nanita played for the Dominican Republic national baseball team in the 2013 World Baseball Classic.

Nanita started the 2013 season with the Double-A New Hampshire Fisher Cats. He was promoted to the Triple-A Buffalo Bisons on May 21.

On January 20, 2014, the Blue Jays announced that Nanita had been signed to a minor league contract that included an invitation to spring training. He was assigned to Triple-A Buffalo before the end of spring training. Nanita was transferred to the temporarily inactive list on May 11, after he opened the season batting .118 over 6 games. On May 17, it was announced that Nanita had been loaned to the Tigres de Quintana Roo of the Mexican Baseball League.

=== Chunichi Dragons ===
Nanita was signed by the Chunichi Dragons of Nippon Professional Baseball on December 15, 2014.

On October 29, 2016, it was confirmed that Nanita would be released from the Dragons along with Leyson Séptimo, Juan Jaime, Drew Naylor, and Anderson Hernández.

=== Guerreros de Oaxaca ===
On March 14, 2018, Nanita signed with the Guerreros de Oaxaca of the Mexican League. He was released on March 30.

== Coaching Career ==
In 2026, Nanita was named as hitting coach for the Dominican Summer League Blue Jays blue team the summer-league affiliate of the Toronto Blue Jays.
