= Juan Jaime (baseball) =

Dominican baseball player (1987–2024)

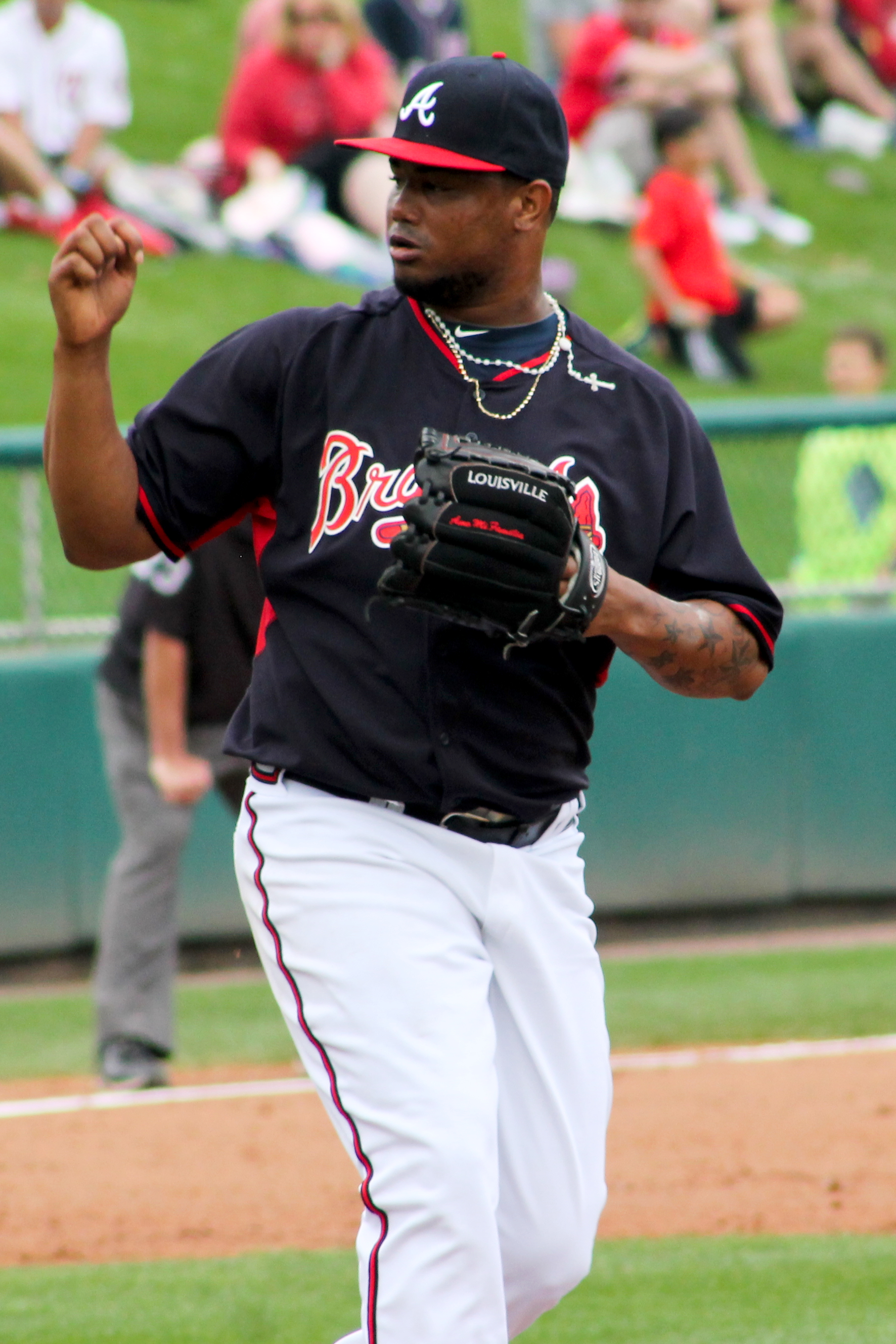
- Jaime with the Atlanta Braves in 2015
- Pitcher
- Born: August 2, 1987; San Cristóbal, Dominican Republic
- Died: December 27, 2024 (aged 37)
- Batted: Right Threw: Right

MLB debut
- June 20, 2014, for the Atlanta Braves

Last MLB appearance
- April 12, 2015, for the Atlanta Braves

MLB statistics
- Win–loss record: 0–1
- Earned run average: 5.93
- Strikeouts: 19
- Stats at Baseball Reference

Teams
- Atlanta Braves (2014–2015)

Juan Jose Jaime Hernandez (August 2, 1987 – December 27, 2024) was a Dominican professional baseball pitcher. He played in Major League Baseball (MLB) for the Atlanta Braves.

== Career ==
=== Washington Nationals ===
Jaime signed as an amateur free agent with the Washington Nationals. In 2007, Jaime pitched for the Nationals team in the rookie-level Dominican Summer League. He logged a total of 26 2/3 innings in 14 relief appearances, winning 3 games, losing none, and recording a 1.35 ERA. During this span, he struck out 34 batters while issuing just 14 bases on balls.

Jaime underwent Tommy John surgery in April 2010, and was subsequently ruled out for the entirety of the season. On November 19, 2010, Jaime was claimed off waivers by the Arizona Diamondbacks. He was designated for assignment on August 13, 2011.

=== Atlanta Braves ===
On August 18, 2011, Jaime signed a minor league contract with the Atlanta Braves organization.

Jaime returned to action in 2012 with the High-A Lynchburg Hillcats. As the team's closer, in 42 appearances, he was 1–3 with a 3.16 ERA and 18 saves, striking out 73 in 51 1/3 innings. Jaime played 2013 with the Double-A Mississippi Braves, where in 35 appearances, he was 2–5 with a 4.07 ERA, striking out 70 in 42 innings. Jaime began 2014 with the Triple-A Gwinnett Braves, where in 27 appearances as the team's closer, he was 1–0 with a 2.39 ERA and 13 saves, striking out 40 in 26 1/3 innings.

On June 19, 2014, Jaime was called up to the Braves, replacing the injured Pedro Beato. The next day, he made his major league debut, registering two strikeouts and preserving a tie in one inning of extra inning work against the team that originally signed him, the Washington Nationals.

Jaime was designated for assignment by the Braves on April 13, 2015. On April 23, Jaime cleared waivers and was sent outright to the Triple-A Gwinnett. After 2 scoreless appearances with Mississippi, he struggled to a 9.82 ERA with 4 strikeouts across 4 games for Gwinnett.

=== Los Angeles Dodgers ===
On May 27, 2015, Jaime was traded to the Los Angeles Dodgers (with Alberto Callaspo, Eric Stults, and Ian Thomas) in exchange for Juan Uribe and Chris Withrow. He spent the rest of the season in the Dodgers' farm system, appearing for the rookie-level Arizona League Dodgers, rookie-level Ogden Raptors, High-A Rancho Cucamonga Quakes, Triple-A Oklahoma City Dodgers.

=== Chunichi Dragons ===
Jaime signed with the Chunichi Dragons of Nippon Professional Baseball on December 1, 2015. He made 6 appearances for Chunichi's farm team, logging a 3.00 ERA with 6 strikeouts across 6 innings of work. On October 29, 2016, it was confirmed that Jaime would be released from the Dragons along with Ricardo Nanita, Leyson Septimo, Drew Naylor, and Anderson Hernandez.

=== Saraperos de Saltillo ===
On April 10, 2017, Jaime signed with the Saraperos de Saltillo of the Mexican League. In 9 appearances for Saltillo, he recorded an 0.96 ERA with 11 strikeouts and 2 saves across 9 1/3 innings pitched. Jaime was released by the Saraperos on May 2.

=== Olmecas de Tabasco ===
On May 9, 2017, Jaime signed with the Olmecas de Tabasco of the Mexican League. In 6 games for Tabasco, he struggled to a 7.71 ERA with 7 strikeouts across 4 2/3 innings of work. Jaime was released by the Olmecas on May 23.

== Death ==
Jaime died of a heart attack on December 27, 2024, at the age of 37.
