= Drew Naylor =

Australian professional baseball pitcher (born 1986)

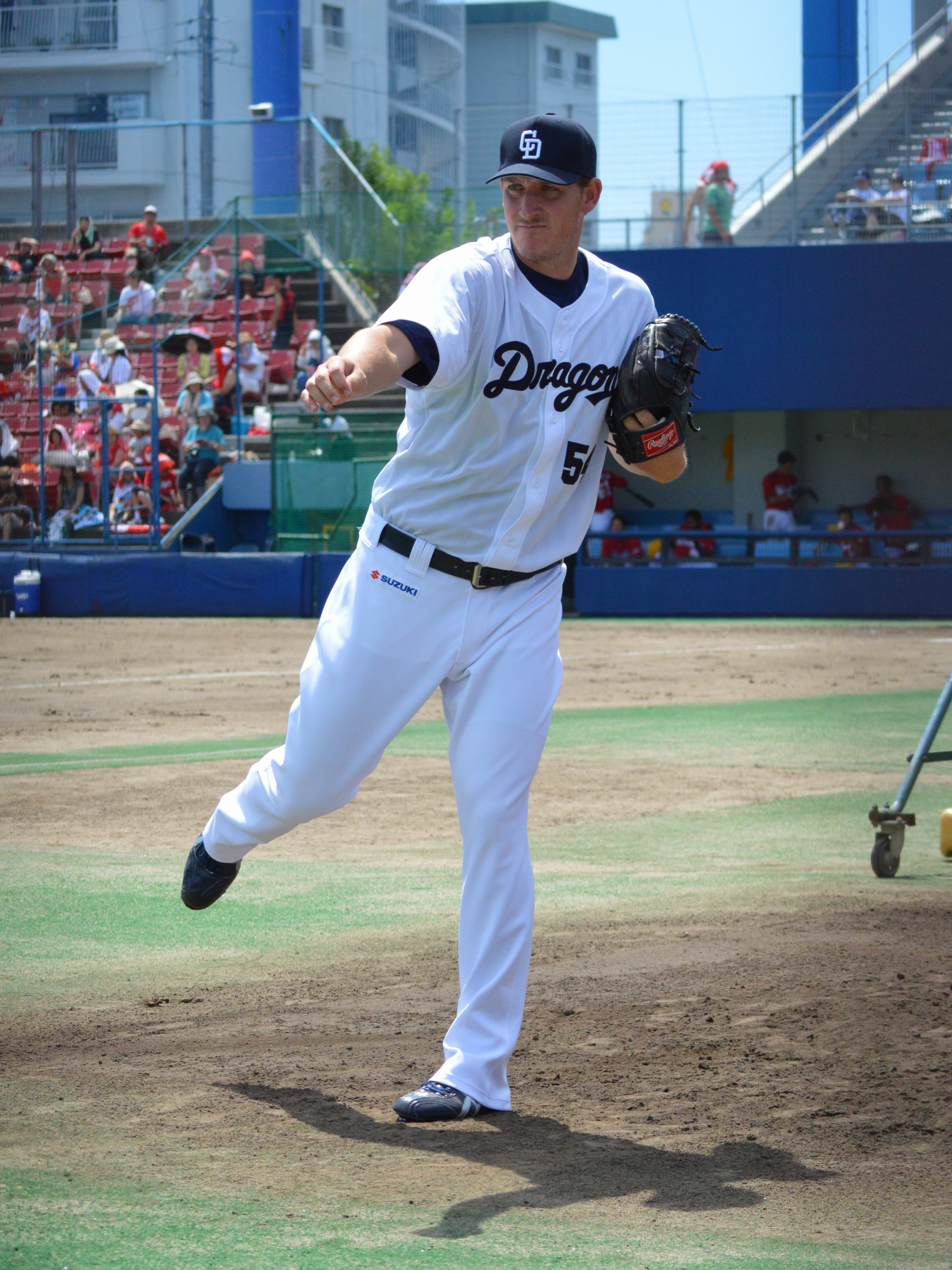
- Naylor with the Chunichi Dragons
- Pitcher
- Born: 31 May 1986 (age 40); Brisbane, Queensland, Australia
- Batted: Right Threw: Right

NPB debut
- 1 August, 2015, for the Chunichi Dragons

Last NPB appearance
- 6 May, 2016, for the Chunichi Dragons

NPB statistics
- Win–loss record: 5-5
- ERA: 4.15
- Strikeouts: 75
- Stats at Baseball Reference

Teams
- Chunichi Dragons (2015–2016); National Team: Australia (2009)

Drew Roy Naylor (born 31 May 1986) is an Australian former professional baseball pitcher. Naylor pitched in Nippon Professional Baseball (NPB) for the Chunichi Dragons from 2015 to 2016. He played in the minor league system of the Philadelphia Phillies, as well as stints with the Brisbane Bandits in the Australian Baseball League and the Kagawa Olive Guyners in the independent Shikoku Island League Plus. He was also selected to represent Australia at the 2009 World Baseball Classic.

== Early life ==
Naylor was educated at Anglican Church Grammar School in East Brisbane, Queensland.

== Career ==
=== Philadelphia Phillies ===
Naylor made his affiliated debut in 2006 and then spent 2006 and 2007 with the Gulf Coast League Phillies and the Williamsport Crosscutters.

He spent the 2008 season with two teams, playing for the Lakewood BlueClaws and the Clearwater Threshers, going 5–3 in 14 games in Lakewood.

Naylor was also on the 2009 World Baseball Classic roster for Australia.

In late 2010 Naylor played the second half of the season in the Australian Baseball League, making his debut on 22 December 2010 in Melbourne where he gave up a two-run home run in two innings of relief at the batter-friendly Melbourne Showgrounds. He finished the season with a 3.21 ERA over 14 innings including two starts. In 2011, he started a Phillies spring training game against Florida State University, picking up the win in a scoreless outing.

He missed the entire 2011 season after undergoing Tommy John surgery, and was designated for assignment by the Phillies on 16 September 2011. He was then released from the Phillies as a free agent in November 2012.

=== Brisbane Bandits ===
In 2014, Naylor returned to Brisbane Bandits and pitched in three games, with 13 strikeouts in 13.2 innings earning a 7.24 ERA. He finished his tenure in the ABL with a 0–2 record.

=== Kagawa Olive Guyners ===
On 2 March 2015, it was announced that Naylor had signed for Kagawa Olive Guyners in the independent Shikoku Island League Plus in Japan.

Naylor made his debut in Japan in an inter-league match against Ishikawa Million Stars where he threw 6 innings allowing only 3 hits and 0 runs. He was largely used as starting pitcher for the remainder of his tenure and recorded 4 wins, 1 loss, and 2 saves with an ERA of 1.37 and 55 strikeouts.

He was selected and pitched for the Shikoku Island All-Stars in a tour of the Can-Am League, and was then subsequently signed for the Chunichi Dragons in the Nippon Professional Baseball.

=== Chunichi Dragons ===
In his second start for the Dragons, Naylor threw 8 innings to register his first win as well as contributing with the bat by hitting a solo homer in the bottom of the 4th inning against the Yakult Swallows.

After starting his second year with the Dragons in the starting rotation, his season was interrupted by elbow soreness when pitching against the Yomiuri Giants on 6 May 2016 ruling him out for an unspecified amount of time. He attempted to get back to fitness with the Dragons Western League team but ultimately to no avail as a niggling shoulder issue ruled him out of the season. Naylor remained in Nagoya to undergo treatment with a view to staying with the Dragons through the 2017 season to help in the lead-up to the 2017 World Baseball Classic in March where he would be expected to represent Australia at the tournament.

On 5 October 2016, it was reported new manager Shigekazu Mori had told Naylor that the team would not be renewing his contract. On 29 October, it was confirmed that Naylor would be released from the team along with Ricardo Nanita, Juan Jaime, Leyson Septimo, and Anderson Hernandez.

=== Return to Brisbane Bandits ===
Following his release from the Dragons, Naylor teamed up once more with his hometown team the Brisbane Bandits in December 2016. He re-signed with the team for the 2018/19 season.
