= Leyson Séptimo =

Dominican baseball player (born 1985)

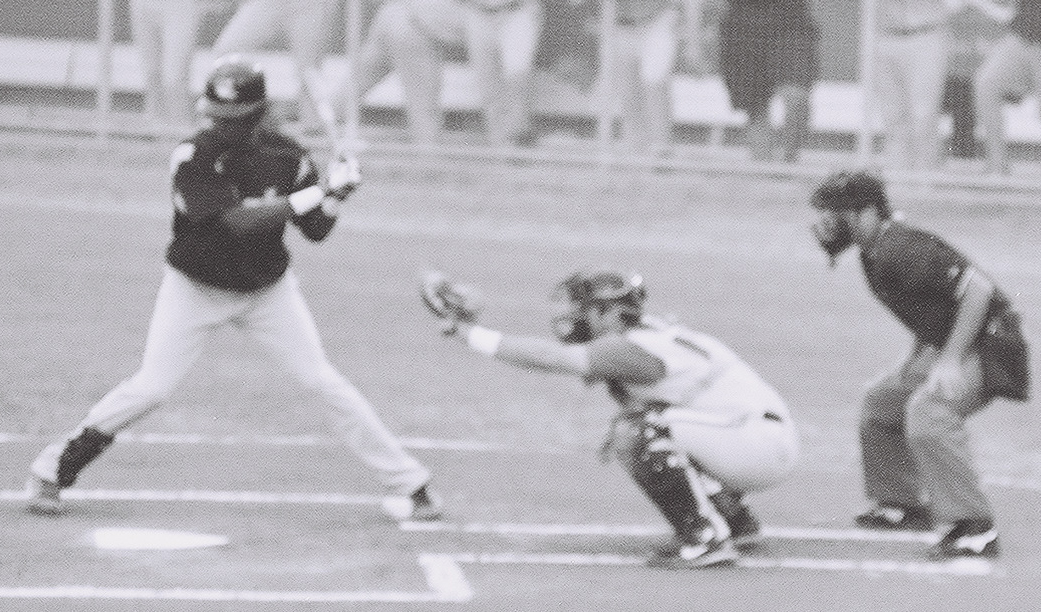
- Séptimo (left) with the South Bend Silver Hawks in 2006
- Pitcher
- Born: July 7, 1985 (age 41); Santo Domingo, Dominican Republic
- Batted: Left Threw: Left

Professional debut
- MLB: June 29, 2012, for the Chicago White Sox
- NPB: July 13, 2016, for the Chunichi Dragons

Last appearance
- MLB: October 3, 2012, for the Chicago White Sox
- NPB: August 30, 2016, for the Chunichi Dragons

MLB statistics
- Win–loss record: 0–2
- Earned run average: 5.02
- Strikeouts: 14

NPB statistics
- Win–loss record: 0–1
- Earned run average: 4.26
- Strikeouts: 1
- Stats at Baseball Reference

Teams
- Chicago White Sox (2012); Chunichi Dragons (2016)
Medals
Men's baseball
Representing Dominican Republic
Central American and Caribbean Games
| Bronze medal – third place | 2014 Veracruz | Team |

Leyson Séptimo Martinez (born July 7, 1985) is a Dominican former professional baseball pitcher. He played in Major League Baseball (MLB) for the Chicago White Sox and in Nippon Professional Baseball (NPB) for the Chunichi Dragons.

== Playing career ==
=== Arizona Diamondbacks ===
On February 19, 2003, Séptimo signed with the Arizona Diamondbacks as an outfielder. He made his professional debut with the Low-A Yakima Bears, playing in 67 games and hitting .241 with two home runs and 21 RBI. Séptimo spent the 2006 campaign with the Single-A South Bend Silver Hawks, making 132 appearances and slashing .251/.310/.346 with six home runs, 51 RBI, and 10 stolen bases. In 2007, he played in 100 games for the High-A Visalia Rawhide, slashing .271/.322/.373 with five home runs, 42 RBI, and 12 stolen bases.

Séptimo converted into a pitcher in 2008, posting a 5.49 ERA in 27 games for Visalia. He split the 2009 campaign between Visalia and the Double-A Mobile BayBears, posting a combined 2–2 record and 4.92 ERA with 69 strikeouts and 9 saves across 45 appearances. Séptimo also appeared in the 2009 All-Star Futures Game. He was a Southern League mid-season All-Star in 2010. In 42 appearances split between Mobile and the Triple-A Reno Aces, Séptimo struggled to a 2–3 record and 6.75 ERA with 57 strikeouts across 45 1/3 innings pitched. He began the 2011 season with Mobile, struggling to a 6.37 ERA in 21 games.

=== Chicago White Sox ===
On June 13, 2011, Séptimo was claimed off waivers by the Chicago White Sox from the Arizona Diamondbacks and optioned to the Double-A Birmingham Barons. On October 14, Séptimo was removed from the 40-man roster and sent outright to the Triple-A Charlotte Knights.

Séptimo was promoted to the major leagues for the first time on June 28, 2012. The next day, Séptimo made his Major League debut against the New York Yankees, pitching a perfect 9th inning while striking out Alex Rodriguez and Robinson Canó.

On April 26, 2013, Séptimo was placed on the 60-day disabled list with a left shoulder strain. On June 11, he was activated from the disabled list. However, Séptimo was subsequently removed from the 40-man roster and sent outright to Triple-A Charlotte. He made 28 total appearances on the season, all with Charlotte, and accumulated a 4.42 ERA with 38 strikeouts. Séptimo elected free agency on October 1.

=== Southern Maryland Blue Crabs ===
On February 10, 2014, Séptimo signed with the Lancaster Barnstormers of the Atlantic League of Professional Baseball. However, he was traded to the Southern Maryland Blue Crabs prior to the start of the season. In 8 appearances for the team, Séptimo struggled to a 14.85 ERA with 4 strikeouts across 6 2/3 innings pitched.

=== York Revolution ===
On January 10, 2015, Septimo signed a minor league contract with the Atlanta Braves organization. He was released by the Braves prior to the start of the season on March 30.

On April 26, 2015, Séptimo signed with the York Revolution of the Atlantic League of Professional Baseball. In 28 appearances for York, Séptimo posted a 2–2 record and 4.28 ERA with 26 strikeouts across 27 1/3 innings pitched.

=== Amarillo Sox ===
On July 11, 2015, Séptimo was traded to the Amarillo Sox of the American Association of Professional Baseball in exchange for cash considerations. In 11 appearances out of the bullpen, he struggled to a 1–4 record and 6.75 ERA with 8 strikeouts across 9 1/3 innings pitched.

=== Joplin Blasters ===
On August 10, 2015, Séptimo was traded to the Joplin Blasters of the American Association of Professional Baseball in exchange for future considerations. In 13 appearances down the stretch, Séptimo recorded an 0.98 ERA with 25 strikeouts across 18 1/3 innings pitched.

=== Chunichi Dragons ===
On June 5, 2016, Septimo signed with Chunichi Dragons of Nippon Professional Baseball. He appeared in three games for Chunichi, logging a 4.26 ERA with one strikeout across 6 1/3 innings pitched. On October 29, it was confirmed that Septimo would be released from the Dragons along with Ricardo Nanita, Juan Jaime, Drew Naylor and Anderson Hernandez.

== Coaching career ==
On April 10, 2024, the Guerreros de Oaxaca of the Mexican League announced Séptimo as their bullpen coach. On July 6, 2025, Séptimo was fired by Oaxaca.

== Pitching style ==
Séptimo throws four pitches — a four-seam fastball in the mid-upper 90s, a two-seam fastball, a slider averaging at about 80 mph, and an occasional changeup. The slider is his main 2-strike pitch.
