= Todd Heap =

American football player (born 1980)

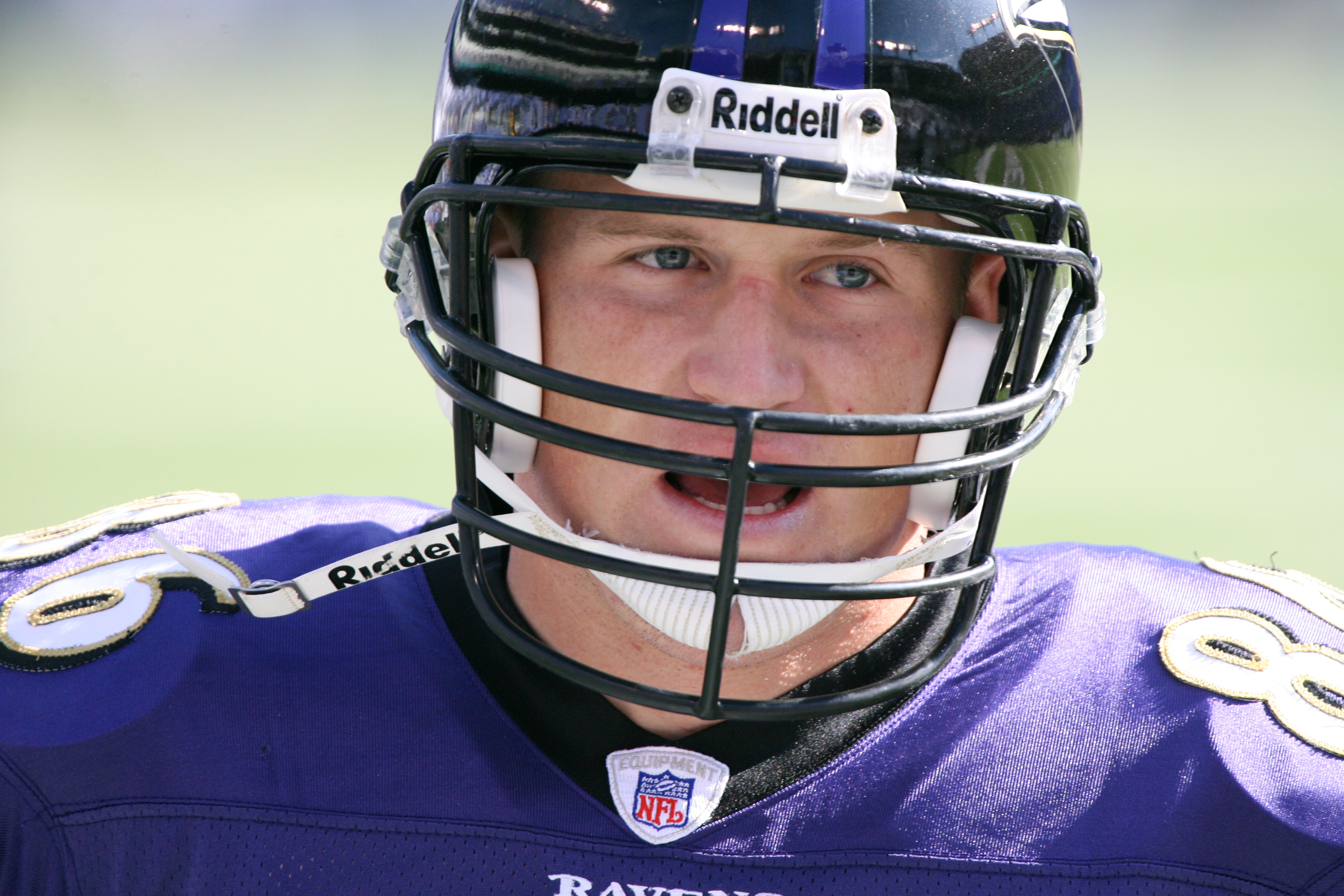
- Heap with the Baltimore Ravens in 2006

No. 86
- Position: Tight end

Personal information
- Born: March 16, 1980 (age 46); Mesa, Arizona, U.S.
- Listed height: 6 ft 5 in (1.96 m)
- Listed weight: 252 lb (114 kg)

Career information
- High school: Mountain View (Mesa)
- College: Arizona State (1998–2000)
- NFL draft: 2001: 1st round, 31st overall pick

Career history
- Baltimore Ravens (2001–2010); Arizona Cardinals (2011–2012)

Awards and highlights
- Second-team All-Pro (2003); 2× Pro Bowl (2002, 2003); NFL Alumni Tight End of the Year (2006); Baltimore Ravens Ring of Honor; Second-team All-American (2000); Third-team All-American (1999); 2× First-team All-Pac-10 (1999, 2000)

Career NFL statistics
- Receptions: 499
- Receiving yards: 5,869
- Receiving touchdowns: 42
- Stats at Pro Football Reference

Todd Benjamin Heap (born March 16, 1980) is an American former professional football player who was a tight end for 12 seasons in the National Football League (NFL), primarily for the Baltimore Ravens. He was selected to the Pro Bowl twice with the Ravens, earning second-team All-Pro honors in 2003.

After playing college football for the Arizona State Sun Devils, Heap was selected by Baltimore in the first round of the 2001 NFL draft. He played ten years for the Ravens, becoming the franchise's all-time leader in touchdown catches and second all-time in receptions and yards. He played two years for the Arizona Cardinals from 2011-2012.

== Early life ==
A 1998 graduate of Mountain View High School in Mesa, Arizona, Todd lettered three years in football, three years in basketball and two years in baseball. Todd helped Mountain View win back-to-back football state championships in 1996 and 1997, going undefeated both years. He also helped both the basketball and baseball teams win a State Championship his senior year. During his high school years, Todd won many football related awards, including Arizona All-Star honors, All-Arizona, Super All-State, Arizona 5A Player of the Year, Ed Doherty Player of the Year, All-East Valley Two-Way Player of the Year as a senior and a SuperPrep All-American. Todd broke several school records, including most career receiving yards (1,377), most career receptions (87), most career touchdown receptions, and most touchdown catches in one game (3). In the state championship game against Tucson Amphitheater, he caught one touchdown pass, scored a two-point conversion and threw a 26-yard touchdown pass.

== College career ==
Heap played college football at Arizona State University, majoring in pre-business. His 115 receptions broke the school record for tight ends, previously held by Ken Dyer.

- 1999: 55 catches for 832 yards with three touchdowns
- 2000: 45 catches for 617 yards with three touchdowns

== Professional career ==
Pre-draft measurables
Height	Weight	Arm length	Hand span	40-yard dash	10-yard split	20-yard split	Vertical jump	Bench press
6 ft 4 5/8 in (1.95 m)	252 lb (114 kg)	33 in (0.84 m)	9 1/2 in (0.24 m)	4.68 s	1.69 s	2.74 s	32.0 in (0.81 m)	22 reps
All values are from NFL Combine

=== Baltimore Ravens ===
The Baltimore Ravens selected Heap in the first round (31st overall) of the 2001 NFL draft. Through the end of the 2009 NFL season he played 120 total career games, starting 115.

Heap recorded 16 receptions for 206 yards and one touchdown in his rookie season, playing behind eight-time Pro-Bowler Shannon Sharpe. He became the starting tight end for the Ravens in 2002 after Sharpe left in free agency. The Ravens were 7–9 in Heap's second season. He caught 68 passes for 836 yards and six touchdowns and was voted to his first Pro Bowl. The following season in 2003, Heap garnered 57 receptions for 693 yards and three touchdowns, despite the Ravens having a run-first offense, behind the record breaking 2,066-yard rushing season of Jamal Lewis. Heap set the NFL record in 2003 for the most two-point conversion in a season, with 4, a record that still stands as of the 2025 season. He was again voted to the Pro Bowl as the Ravens won the AFC North division for the first time. Heap had six receptions for 80 yards and a touchdown in a 20-17 playoff loss to the Tennessee Titans.

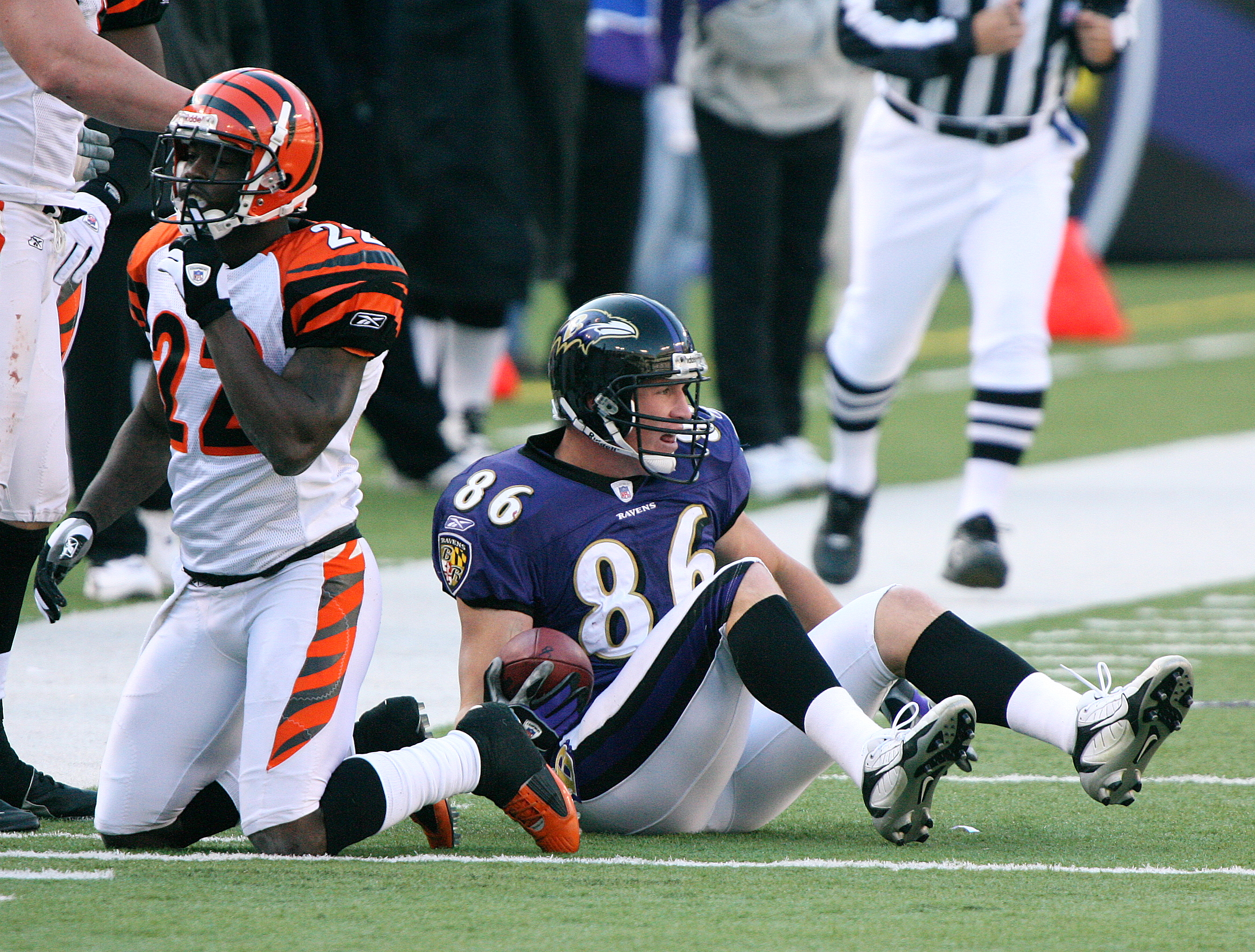
Johnathan Joseph and Todd Heap in 2006

Heap was injured in the second week of the 2004 season, in a game against the Pittsburgh Steelers. He returned in Week 13, but missed the final game of the season. He finished the season with 303 yards and three touchdowns in six games. He returned healthy and ready to play in the 2005 season. The Ravens team suffered numerous injuries to their starters, and ended the season 6–10. Heap caught 75 passes for 855 yards and seven touchdowns.

In 2006 he would begin catching passes from former rival and Pro Bowl quarterback Steve McNair. It would also prove to be the Ravens best regular season, as they won the AFC North for the second time in franchise history with a record of 13–3. Heap caught 73 passes for 765 yards and six touchdowns. Heap missed 10 games in the 2007 season due to injury, and caught only 23 passes, amassing 239 yards and one touchdown. In 2008, he collected 35 receptions for 403 yards and three touchdowns. The Ravens advanced to the AFC Championship Game for the first time since the 2000 season, but would lose to the Steelers.

Heap played through numerous injuries in the 2009 season, yet had 53 receptions for 593 yards and six touchdowns, and twice scored two touchdowns in a single game. The Ravens finished 9–7, losing in the second round of the playoffs to the Indianapolis Colts. He built on his success from the previous year in 2010, going on to have one of the best seasons of his career. In 12 games, he notched 37 receptions for 546 yards, and five touchdowns, one being a career long 65-yard touchdown. In a Week 13 match-up with the Steelers, he suffered a pulled hamstring on the first offensive snap for Baltimore, taking him out of the game. As a precaution, he missed the next three weeks, not wanting to re-aggravate or worsen the injury.

On July 25, 2011, the day the NFL announced the Collective Bargaining Agreement, the Ravens announced they would be releasing him once free agency began. He was officially released on July 28.

=== Arizona Cardinals ===
On July 31, 2011, Heap signed a two-year contract with the Arizona Cardinals. He appeared in 12 games for the Cardinals, totaling 32 receptions for 377 yards and one touchdown. After being injured in a Week 2 game against the New England Patriots on September 16, 2012, late in the third quarter, he did not return for the remaining 11 weeks afterwards and was eventually released by the Cardinals on December 4, 2012.

=== Retirement ===
Heap retired from professional football in 2013. On May 13, 2014, the Baltimore Ravens announced Heap would be inducted into the team's Ring of Honor.

In 2017, Heap joined the Ravens' radio broadcast crew, to serve as a color analyst for four regular-season games.

== NFL career statistics ==
Legend
**Bold**	Career high

Year	Team	Games		Receiving					Rushing					Fumbles	
Year	Team	GP	GS	Rec	Yds	Avg	Lng	TD	Att	Yds	Avg	Lng	TD	Fum	Lost
2001	BAL	12	6	16	206	12.9	24T	1	—	—	—	—	—	1	**1**
2002	BAL	16	16	68	836	12.3	43	6	**4**	**38**	**9.5**	**15**	0	0	0
2003	BAL	16	16	57	693	12.2	33T	3	3	21	7.0	9	0	1	0
2004	BAL	6	5	27	303	11.2	37	3	—	—	—	—	—	0	0
2005	BAL	16	16	**75**	**855**	11.4	48	**7**	—	—	—	—	—	**2**	**1**
2006	BAL	16	16	73	765	10.5	30	6	—	—	—	—	—	0	0
2007	BAL	6	6	23	239	10.4	37	1	—	—	—	—	—	0	0
2008	BAL	16	16	35	403	11.5	30	3	—	—	—	—	—	1	**1**
2009	BAL	16	16	53	593	11.2	31	6	1	2	2.0	2	0	1	0
2010	BAL	13	13	40	599	**15.0**	**65T**	5	—	—	—	—	—	1	0
2011	ARI	10	4	24	283	11.8	28	1	—	—	—	—	—	0	0
2012	ARI	2	1	8	94	11.8	28	0	—	—	—	—	—	0	0
Career		145	131	499	5,869	11.8	65	42	8	61	7.6	15	0	7	3

== Personal life ==
Heap and his wife Ashley had five children. Their youngest daughter, Holly, was killed at three years old in 2017 when Heap accidentally ran her over in his driveway while moving his vehicle. In her honor, the Heap family created Hugs from Holly, a campaign that centers around acts of kindness. Every May 4, which was Holly Heap's birthday, is “Hugs From Holly Day.”

Heap is one of six children. His mother is the cousin of former pro-bowl NFL player Danny White, while his great-uncle Verl played basketball at Arizona State.

Heap is a professed member of the Church of Jesus Christ of Latter-day Saints.
