= Organ Stop Pizza =

Restaurant Mesa, Arizona, with large Wurlitzer organ

Coordinates: 33.3928°N 111.8078°W

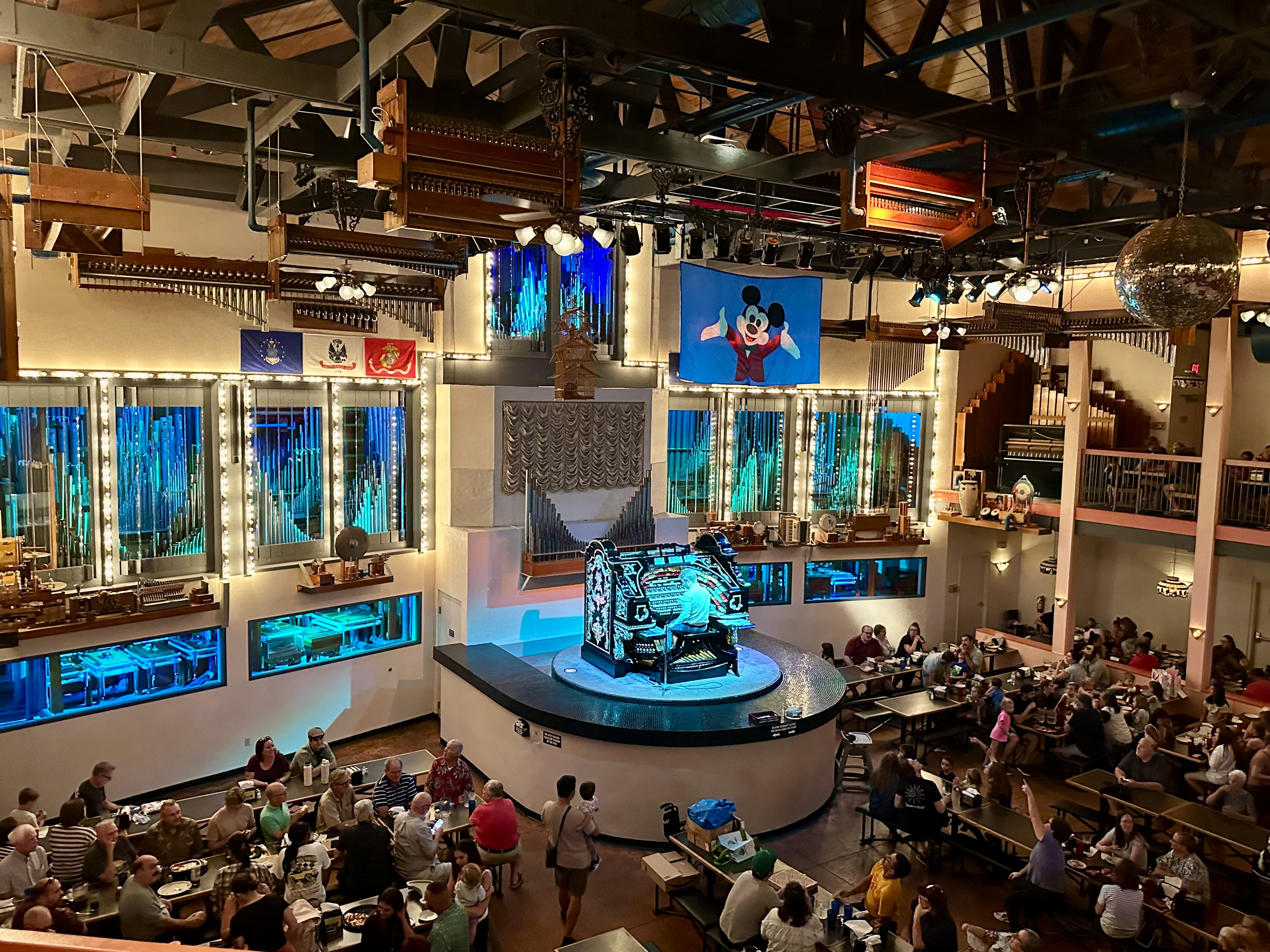
The Organ Stop Pizza Restaurant in Mesa, Arizona.

Organ Stop Pizza is a restaurant located in Mesa, Arizona. It is known for being the home of the largest Wurlitzer theatre organ in the world.

== Overview ==
The organ is played 363 days a year, with private groups before opening hours, making it the most played organ in the world. The organ is powered by three Spencer turbine blowers (with a fourth as a standby), spinning at 1800 RPM with a combined 60HP, moving 10,000 cubic feet of air. The Wurlitzer has more than 6,000 pipes. The largest pipes are 32 feet long and could fit four people inside.

The core of the Wurlitzer pipe organ at Organ Stop Pizza was built for the Denver Theatre in Denver, Colorado, and was installed in 1927 for silent movies. It saw service there until the 1930s. The organ was rebuilt in 1975 for the Mesa Organ Stop Pizza location. The Wurlitzer was later expanded to include pieces from other Wurlitzers.

It is a frequent recipient of Phoenix New Times annual "Best of Phoenix" awards.

== History ==
The first Organ Stop Pizza location opened in 1972 at the corner of 7th St and Missouri Ave in Phoenix, Arizona. A second location opened in Mesa near Southern Ave and Dobson Rd in 1975. Bill Brown owned a construction business at the same time. There was also a location in Tucson for a short time.

In 1984, Bill Brown owner of the restaurants sold the Phoenix location to a local real estate developer who subsequently closed it. The original Mesa location was sold to manager Mike Everett and business partner Brad Bishop the same year. In 1995, the original Mesa location was closed because of the volume of business and replaced by a new, larger facility doubling the size of the restaurant near Southern Ave and Stapley Dr. With also the organ being expanded again to its current size 4/82 (4-manual 82-rank organ)
