= Mesa Public Schools =

School district in Arizona, United States

Mesa Unified School District No. 4

Location
- 63 E. Main Street, #101; Mesa, AZ 85201 United States

District information
- Type: Public
- Motto: "Unprecedented Excellence in Education"
- Grades: PK–12
- Established: 1946
- Superintendent: Matthew D. Strom
- Budget: $790,837,000 (2021–22)
- NCES District ID: 0404970

Students and staff
- Students: 57,204 (2023–24)
- Teachers: 3,282.88 ((on an FTE basis))
- Student–teacher ratio: 17.42

Other information
- Website: www.mpsaz.org

Mesa Public Schools (incorporated as Mesa Unified School District #44) is the largest public school district in the U.S. state of Arizona, headquartered in Mesa. It has approximately 56,000 students. The district has, in addition to regular programs, Montessori, International Baccalaureate, dual-language immersion, honors, and Advanced Placement courses.

MPS serves most of the city of Mesa, plus small portions of Tempe and Chandler. It also takes students from the Salt River Pima–Maricopa Indian Community.

The district has 82 schools, which includes 55 elementary schools, nine junior high schools, six comprehensive high schools, and several alternative schools.

== Enrollment ==
Mesa Public Schools has seen a decline in enrollment in the 21st century, much of which can be attributed to the decline in affordability of housing. As families become cost-burdened by rental and home ownership costs, they have been relocating to less expensive cities. In Mesa, rents increased by an average of 60% from 2017 to 2023. In Arizona, "the monthly cost of homeownership (excluding the 2022-23 increase in interest rates) for the average home in Arizona increased by 73%, from $1,750 in August 2017 to $3,032 in August 2023." The average house price in the state has increased 216% since 2000, while wages have only increased by an average of 48% in the same time period.

The difficulty of building more housing has contributed to the rising rental and home ownership costs. Average family sizes have decreased, meaning that many more single-family homes, as compared to multifamily homes, would be needed to house the rapidly growing population in the state. Current zoning laws make building more single-family and especially multifamily housing more difficult.

== Schools ==
=== High schools ===
High schools (9–12) as listed by Mesa Public Schools:

School	Dobson	Franklin	Mesa	Mountain View	Red Mountain	Skyline	Westwood
Opened	1983	2026	1898, 1909 ("Old Main"); 1972 (current building)	1976	1988	2000	1962
Colors	Blue, silver	Red, Gold	Purple, gold	Blue, red	Cardinal red, black	Gold, green	Orange, blue
Mascot	Mustangs	Firebirds	Jackrabbits	Toros	Mountain Lions	Coyotes	Warriors
Principal	Gabrielle Buckley	Jeffrey Abrams	Kirk Thomas	Mike Oliver	Bruce Cosseboom	Greg Mendez	Chris Gilmore
Athletic conference	6A		6A	6A	6A	6A	6A
Enrollment (2020–2021)	2,286		3,460	3,272	3,340	2,389	3,355

=== Junior high schools ===
Junior high schools (7–8) as listed by Mesa Public Schools:

School	Carson	Fremont	Franklin	Kino	Poston	Rhodes	Smith	Stapley	Taylor
Colors	Red, black, white	Purple, white	Blue, Silver	Forest green, gold	Teal, black, white	Maroon, gold	Navy, gold	Vegas gold, maroon	Gold, black
Mascot	Cougars	Falcons	Firebirds	Kolts	Panthers	Roadrunners	Sidewinders	Sabercats	Trojans
Principal	Esteban Ruiz	Michelle Hall	Jeffrey Abrams	Keiko Dilbeck	Michael Rapier	Joan Wilson	Adam Unrein	James Fisher	Gina Piraino

Mesa Public Schools operated two other junior high schools until the 2009–2010 school year.

Hendrix Junior High School consolidated with the adjoining Frost Elementary School as the K-8 Summit Academy with an International Baccalaureate Program. Hendrix had the husky as its mascot, and used the colors red and gray.

Powell Junior High School (colors red, white, and blue; mascot Patriot) closed in May 2010. The former campus serves as the Mesa Educational Center, home to the district's Community Education Department, East Valley Academy and Crossroads.

Mesa Jr. High closed at the end of the 2011–2012 school year and was demolished in January 2014. After demolition, the site was converted into a community center.

Brimhall Jr. High closed at the end of the 2011–2012 school year. It was converted into Franklin Accelerated School, which would house students from two Franklin elementary schools, Franklin South and Franklin Northeast, and the only Franklin Junior High. The move was made in order to save money due to a variety of converging factors: the declining enrollment during the previous five years, the budget reduction of $110 million in the same period (mostly due to declining enrollment), and the need to economize by reducing the amount of buildings to be maintained. The approximately 1,300 students who attended Brimhall Jr. High would then be moved into other junior high schools; the district reported about 4,353 empty seats at junior high schools that year, allowing for the redistribution of students.

Name notes

- Fremont — John C. Fremont
- Kino — Eusebio Kino
- Poston — Charles D. Poston, referred to as the "father of Arizona" due to his efforts lobbying for creation of the territory
- Shepherd — Rulon T. Shepherd, 30-year Mesa superintendent who built the first junior high in Mesa
- Stapley — Orley. S. Stapley, at one time the largest International Harvester farm equipment dealer in the United States, as well as the owner of the largest mercantile business in Arizona during the 1940s and 1950s; also the namesake of Stapley Drive
- Taylor — Harvey L. Taylor, former Mesa superintendent and principal

=== 7-12 ===
- Shepherd College Prep ( It is grade 7-9 in its first year but meant by one more grade level each new school year till it is fully 7-12).

=== Elementary schools ===
Elementary schools (K–6) as listed by Mesa Public Schools:

- Adams
- Anne M. Lindbergh
- Benjamin Franklin
- Benjamin Franklin Elementary - West Campus
- Barbara Bush
- Crismon Elementary
- Dilworth Brinton
- Edison
- Eisenhower Center For Innovation
- Entz
- Falcon Hill
- Field
- Franklin Accelerated Academy - Brimhall
- Franklin Accelerated Academy - Downtown
- Franklin Accelerated Academy - East
- Franklin Accelerated Academy - Jordan
- Franklin Accelerated Academy - Wilson
- Hale
- Hermosa Vista
- Highland
- Holmes
- Hughes
- Irving
- James Madison
- Jefferson
- John K. Kerr, M. D. Center for Agriscience
- John Philip Sousa
- Keller
- Las Sendas
- Lehi
- Lincoln
- Longfellow
- Lowell
- MacArthur
- Nathan Hale
- Patterson
- Pedro Guerrero Elementary
- Pomeroy
- Porter
- Ralph Waldo Emerson
- Ramón S. Mendoza
- Red Mountain Ranch STEM Academy (K-8)
- Redbird
- Robson
- Roosevelt
- Salk
- Sandra Day O’Connor
- Sirrine Montessori
- Stevenson
- Taft
- Veora E. Johnson
- Washington
- Webster
- Whitman
- Whittier
- Zaharis
- Zedo Ishikawa

Frost Elementary consolidated with the adjoining Hendrix Junior High in 2010–11 to become the K–8 Summit Academy.

=== Alternative schools ===
Alternative schools (named "focus schools" by the district) as listed by Mesa Public Schools:

Name	Grades	Details
Crossroads	7–12	Small school environment
Eagleridge Enrichment Program	K - 12	Home schooling enrichment program
East Valley Academy	9–12	Small school environment with more flexible hours and a credit recovery program
Jordan Center for Early Education	Preschool	Preschool with Montessori option available
Mesa Academy for Advanced Studies	4–8	Rigorous IB curriculum program preparing for advanced courses in high school; top performing school in Arizona
Mesa Distance Learning Program	6–12	Computer-based online learning program
Red Mountain Center for Early Education	Preschool	Preschool campus
Riverview High School	7–12	Referral-only school for students with discipline issues
SHARP School	K–12	Alternative needs program for students with qualifying disabilities
Summit Academy	K–6	International Baccalaureate primary years program
Summit Academy	7–8	International Baccalaureate middle years program
Superstition High School	7–12	Small school environment

== See also ==
- Chandler Unified School District
- Gilbert Public Schools
- Tempe Elementary School District
- Tempe Union High School District
- Mesa Distance Learning Program
