= Mesa Distance Learning Program =

Location
- 1025 N. Country Club Dr. Mesa, Maricopa, Arizona AZ 85201-3307; United States

Information
- School type: State, Online, Public
- Motto: Your online link to quality education
- Established: 1999
- Founder: Doug Barnard
- School board: Mesa Public Schools
- Grades: 5-12
- International students: yes
- Hours in school day: 5 hour per week per course recommended
- Accreditation: Mesa Public Schools
- MDLP.org front page

- A lecture page for a sample biology course

Mesa Distance Learning Program (MDLP) is a distance learning program for grades 5–12 sponsored by Mesa Public Schools in Mesa, Arizona, US that offers students worldwide a US-based education leading to a high school diploma. Tuition is free for students studying in Arizona who have also passed Arizona's Instrument to Measure Standards exam to obtain that benefit. Those enrolling from outside Arizona must pay USD 225 per course. The Mesa Distance Learning Program is also used by other Arizona school districts.

The program initially catered to students in Arizona who could not attend a local high school. However, following its success, the program is now being used widely in territories outside Arizona, including the UK, India, and Australia.

== Coursework ==
All courses are aligned to Mesa District, state of Arizona and national curriculum standards. The Mesa Distance Learning Program claims that they are the only distance learning program whose lab and fine art courses meet the requirements to enter Arizona universities. All students are required to take a mandatory final exam at the end of each course. This may be done using an approved proctor or at the MDLP office. If the student fails the final exam, they fail the course.

Each course lasts 18 weeks but students are encouraged to complete the course as soon as possible. The program is designed to be completed by studying for one hour per day per school week for each course. Students can take as many courses as they like. However, to complete the course within the usual time frame, high school students must be enrolled in at least four courses, and junior high students (grades 7–8) must be enrolled in six courses.

=== Course offered ===
MDLP offers a wide range of course work. As in traditional high schools, students are able to take elective programs and foreign languages. Due to China's presence in the world economy, a Mandarin Chinese language course was added to the list of courses offered by MDLP. Students can also take Mandarin Chinese through the online Mesa Distance Learning Program.

== History ==
Founded in 1999, the Mesa Distance Learning Program initially had little data access. Student management and gradebook was being contracted out to a commercial company. The program was mainly used by home school and disabled students as an alternative to attending traditional schools. It also included those with disabilities preventing them from attending a mainstream school on a regular basis, and students with certain types of school phobias. Interactions between student and teacher were done through email.

In more recent times the program has made many changes including more teacher involvement. The courseware, student management, grade book, and dialog (message box) are now done in-house by Mesa and do not depend on third party involvement. Data access is now given to the teacher, parent, administrator, counselor and lab teacher, and the teacher feedback feature was added in 2007. Mesa moved from commercial software to in-house use to retain control of the software design and to ensure the curriculum is aligned with Arizona standards.

== See also ==
- Distance education
