= Jamar Hunt =

American football player (born 1982)

Profile
- Position: Tight end

Personal information
- Born: December 4, 1982 (age 43)
- Listed height: 6 ft 7 in (2.01 m)
- Listed weight: 260 lb (118 kg)

Career information
- College: Texas-El Paso
- NFL draft: 2009: undrafted

Career history
- Dallas Cowboys (2009)

Jamar Hunt (born December 4, 1982) is an American former football tight end for the Dallas Cowboys of the National Football League. He was signed as an undrafted rookie free agent out of UTEP. However, he was waived by the Cowboys on July 2, 2009.
