= Mesa, Arizona =

City in Arizona, United States

Mesa
- City
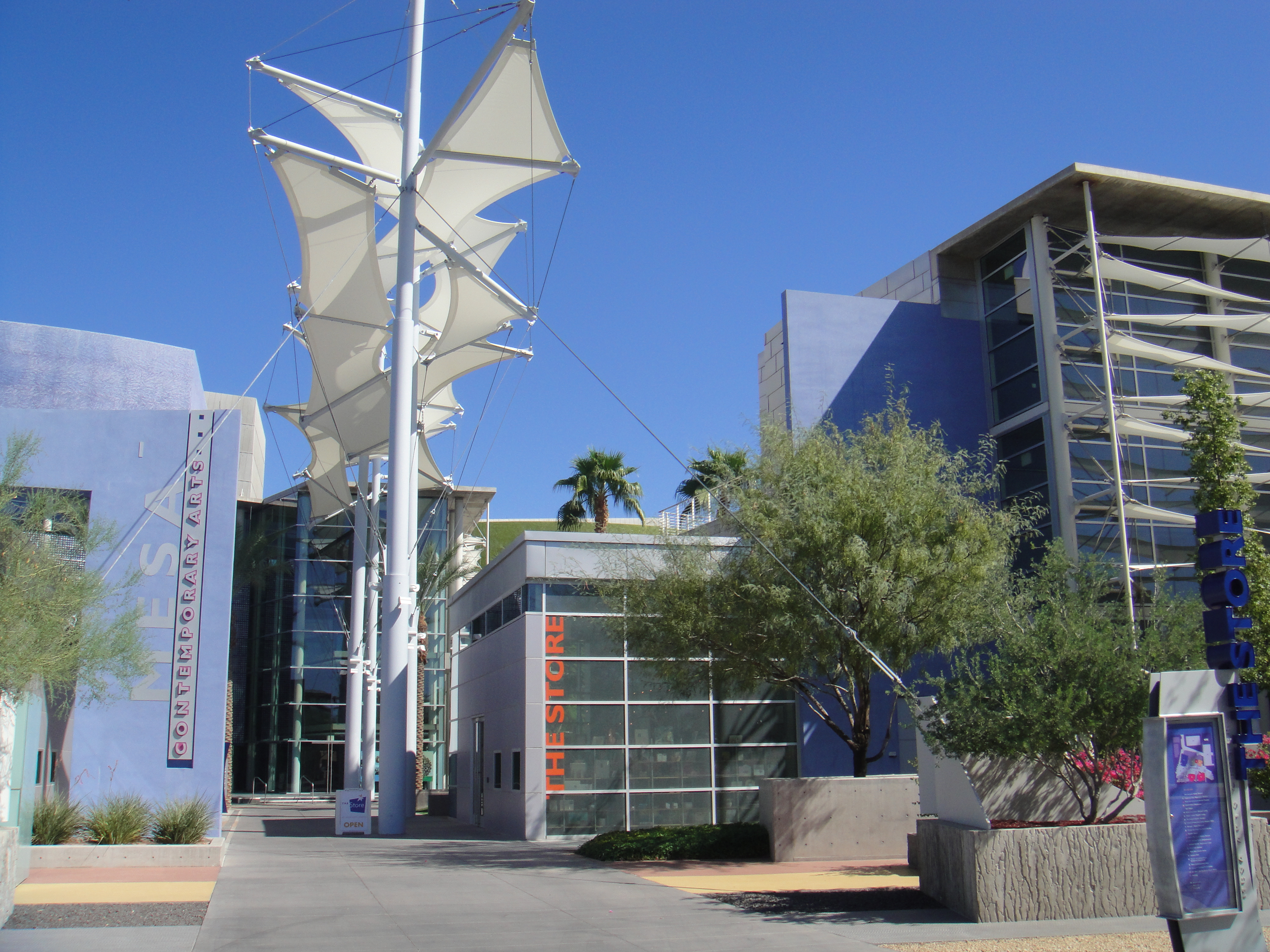
- Mesa Arts Center building in downtown Mesa

- Flag Logo
- Interactive map of Mesa
- Location within Arizona Location within the United States
- Coordinates: 33°25′20″N 111°49′22″W
- Country: United States
- State: Arizona
- County: Maricopa
- Founded: 1878

Government
  - Type: Mayor–council
  - Mayor: Mark Freeman (R)

Area
  - Total: 139.42 sq mi (361.09 km^{2})
  - Land: 138.80 sq mi (359.48 km^{2})
  - Water: 0.63 sq mi (1.62 km^{2})
- Elevation: 1,326 ft (404 m)

Population (2020)
  - Total: 504,258
  - Estimate (2025): 513,656 ▲
  - Rank: 37th in the United States; 3rd in Arizona
  - Density: 3,633.1/sq mi (1,402.76/km^{2})
- Time zone: UTC−7 (MST (no DST))
- ZIP codes: 85201-85216, 85274-85275, 85277
- Area code(s): 480 and 602
- FIPS code: 04-46000
- GNIS feature ID: 2411087
- Website: www.mesaaz.gov

Mesa (/ˈmeɪsə/ MAY-sə) is a city in Maricopa County, Arizona, United States. The population was 504,258 at the 2020 census. It is the third-most populous city in Arizona, after Phoenix and Tucson, the 38th-most populous city in the U.S., and the most populous city that is not a county seat (except for independent cities Washington, D.C. and Baltimore which are not part of any county). It is the most populous city in the East Valley of the Phoenix metropolitan area. It borders Tempe on the west, the Salt River Pima–Maricopa Indian Community on the north, Chandler and Gilbert on the south along with Queen Creek and Apache Junction on the east.

At least ten colleges and universities were located in Mesa, as is the Mesa Arizona Temple, one of the first Mormon temples constructed outside of Utah. The city is home to the largest relief airport in the Phoenix area, Mesa Gateway Airport, located in the southeastern corner of the city.

== History ==
The history of Mesa dates back at least 2,000 years to the arrival of the Hohokam culture. The Hohokam built the original canal system. The canals were the largest and most sophisticated in the prehistoric New World. Some were up to 90 feet (27 m) wide and 10 feet (3.0 m) deep at their head gates, extending for as far as 16 miles (26 km) across the desert. By 1100 CE, water could be delivered to an area over 110,000 acres (450 km^{2}), transforming the Sonoran Desert into an agricultural oasis. By 1450, the Hohokam had constructed hundreds of miles of canals, many of which are still in use.

After the disappearance of the Hohokam and before the arrival of the early settlers, little is known; explorers did not venture into this area. By the late 19th century near present-day Mesa, U.S. Army troops relocated the Apache, opening the way for settlement.

In March 1877, Mormon pioneer Daniel Webster Jones and Henry Clay Rogers left St. George, Utah. Jones had been asked by Mormon officials to direct a party of people in establishing a settlement in Arizona. They traveled south and settled on the north side of the present Mesa area. This settlement was initially known as Fort Utah and later as Jonesville. It was located near Lehi Road. In 1883, it was named Lehi at the suggestion of Brigham Young, Jr.

About this same time, another group dubbed the First Mesa Company arrived from Utah and Idaho. Their leaders were Francis Martin Pomeroy, Charles Crismon, George Warren Sirrine and Charles I. Robson. Rather than accepting an invitation to settle at Jones's Lehi settlement, they moved up onto the mesa that serves as the city's namesake. They dug irrigation canals and used some of the original Hohokam canals. By April 1878, water was flowing through them. The Second Mesa Company arrived in 1879 and settled to the west of the First Mesa Company because of more available farmland. This settlement was originally called Alma and later Stringtown. It was located near Alma School Road.

On July 17, 1878, Mesa City was registered as a 1-square-mile (2.6 km^{2}) townsite. The first school was built in 1879. In 1883, Mesa City was incorporated with a population of 300 people. Dr. A. J. Chandler, who would later go on to found the city of Chandler, worked on widening the Mesa Canal in 1895 to allow for enough flow to build a power plant. In 1917, the city of Mesa purchased this utility company. The revenues from the company provided enough for capital expenditures until the 1960s. During the Great Depression, WPA funds provided paved streets, a new hospital, a new town hall and a library.

After the founding of the city, the elected official that most impacted the municipality was George Nicholas Goodman. He was mayor five different times during three different decades (1938–1942, 1946–1948, 1952–1956) (see: List of mayors of Mesa, Arizona). As mayor, he was directly involved in the process of acquiring land for both Falcon Field and Williams Field.

With the opening of Falcon Field and Williams Field in the early 1940s, more military personnel began to move into the Mesa area. With the advent of air conditioning and the rise of tourism, population growth exploded in Mesa as well as the rest of the Phoenix area. Industry—especially early aerospace companies—grew in the 1950s and 1960s. As late as 1960, half of the residents of Mesa made a living with agriculture, but that number declined substantially as Mesa's suburban growth continued on track with the rest of the Phoenix metro area.

== Geography ==
=== Defining east and west Mesa ===
Mesa stretches 18 miles (29 km) from Price Road in the west to Meridian Road in the east and has a land area of 138.70 square miles (359.2 km^{2}). Mesa employs a grid system for street numbering that is different from that used in Phoenix and other portions of the metropolitan area. Center Street, running north to south, bisects Mesa into eastern and western halves and serves as the east and west numbering point of origin within Mesa. Streets west of Center St., such as W. University Drive or W. Main St. are considered to be in West Mesa, whereas streets east of Center St., such as E. University or E. Main St., are considered to be in East Mesa.

=== Climate ===
Located in the Sonoran Desert, Mesa has a hot desert climate (Köppen: BWh), with mild winters and very hot summers.

Climate data for East Mesa, Arizona, 1991–2020 normals, extremes 2002–present
Month	Jan	Feb	Mar	Apr	May	Jun	Jul	Aug	Sep	Oct	Nov	Dec	Year
Record high °F (°C)	84 (29)	89 (32)	102 (39)	105 (41)	112 (44)	120 (49)	121 (49)	117 (47)	115 (46)	105 (41)	98 (37)	85 (29)	121 (49)
Mean maximum °F (°C)	78.8 (26.0)	83.1 (28.4)	90.4 (32.4)	99.5 (37.5)	105.7 (40.9)	113.2 (45.1)	115.0 (46.1)	113.3 (45.2)	109.6 (43.1)	101.1 (38.4)	91.4 (33.0)	78.9 (26.1)	116.6 (47.0)
Mean daily maximum °F (°C)	67.5 (19.7)	70.1 (21.2)	77.2 (25.1)	85.2 (29.6)	94.4 (34.7)	104.1 (40.1)	105.9 (41.1)	104.6 (40.3)	100.2 (37.9)	89.5 (31.9)	76.8 (24.9)	66.1 (18.9)	86.8 (30.4)
Daily mean °F (°C)	54.2 (12.3)	56.4 (13.6)	62.4 (16.9)	69.3 (20.7)	78.0 (25.6)	87.4 (30.8)	92.4 (33.6)	91.5 (33.1)	85.8 (29.9)	74.3 (23.5)	62.2 (16.8)	53.1 (11.7)	72.3 (22.4)
Mean daily minimum °F (°C)	41.0 (5.0)	42.7 (5.9)	47.6 (8.7)	53.3 (11.8)	61.6 (16.4)	70.7 (21.5)	78.9 (26.1)	78.4 (25.8)	71.4 (21.9)	59.1 (15.1)	47.6 (8.7)	40.1 (4.5)	57.7 (14.3)
Mean minimum °F (°C)	28.0 (−2.2)	30.4 (−0.9)	36.0 (2.2)	42.1 (5.6)	51.3 (10.7)	61.7 (16.5)	71.1 (21.7)	70.4 (21.3)	59.7 (15.4)	45.8 (7.7)	35.6 (2.0)	28.3 (−2.1)	25.5 (−3.6)
Record low °F (°C)	20 (−7)	20 (−7)	30 (−1)	35 (2)	46 (8)	57 (14)	63 (17)	65 (18)	50 (10)	35 (2)	27 (−3)	24 (−4)	20 (−7)
Average precipitation inches (mm)	1.36 (35)	1.46 (37)	1.31 (33)	0.36 (9.1)	0.16 (4.1)	0.05 (1.3)	1.18 (30)	1.29 (33)	1.13 (29)	0.56 (14)	0.79 (20)	1.11 (28)	10.76 (273.5)
Average precipitation days (≥ 0.01 in)	4.1	3.7	2.6	1.5	1.1	0.7	4.8	5.2	3.3	2.4	2.3	4.6	36.3
Source 1: NOAA
Source 2: National Weather Service (mean maxima/minima 2006–2020)

Climate data for Mesa
Month	Jan	Feb	Mar	Apr	May	Jun	Jul	Aug	Sep	Oct	Nov	Dec	Year
Mean daily daylight hours	10.0	11.0	12.0	13.0	14.0	14.5	14.0	13.5	12.5	11.5	10.5	10.0	12.2
Source: Weather Atlas

== Demographics ==
Historical population
Census	Pop.	Note	%±
1900	722		—
1910	1,692		134.3%
1920	3,036		79.4%
1930	3,711		22.2%
1940	7,224		94.7%
1950	16,790		132.4%
1960	33,772		101.1%
1970	63,049		86.7%
1980	152,453		141.8%
1990	288,091		89.0%
2000	396,375		37.6%
2010	439,041		10.8%
2020	504,258		14.9%
2025 (est.)	513,656	▲	1.9%
U.S. Decennial Census; 2010–2020

Mesa city, Arizona – racial and ethnic composition Note: the US Census treats Hispanic/Latino as an ethnic category. This table excludes Latinos from the racial categories and assigns them to a separate category. Hispanics/Latinos may be of any race.
Race / Ethnicity (NH = Non-Hispanic)	2020	2010	2000	1990	1980
White alone (NH)	59.6% (300,502)	64.3% (282,505)	73.2% (290,180)	84.9% (244,577)	88.1% (134,317)
Black alone (NH)	3.9% (18,819)	3.2% (14,101)	2.4% (9,377)	1.8% (5,146)	1.2% (1,834)
American Indian alone (NH)	1.9% (9,754)	1.9% (8,359)	1.4% (5,454)	0.9% (2,621)	0.6% (961)
Asian alone (NH)	2.5% (12,725)	1.9% (8,174)	1.5% (5,755)	1.4% (4,140)	0.8% (1,290)
Pacific Islander alone (NH)	0.4% (1,892)	0.4% (1,532)	0.2% (874)		
Other race alone (NH)	0.5% (2,250)	0.1% (555)	0.1% (402)	0.1% (250)	0.1% (161)
Multiracial (NH)	3.9% (19,826)	1.8% (8,062)	1.5% (6,052)	—	—
Hispanic/Latino (any race)	27.3% (137,490)	26.4% (115,753)	19.8% (78,281)	10.9% (31,357)	9.1% (13,890)

=== 2010 census ===
As of the census of 2010, there were 439,041 people, 146,643 households, and 99,863 families residing in the city. The population density was 3,171.3 inhabitants per square mile (1,224.4/km^{2}). There were 175,701 housing units at an average density of 1,405.7 per square mile (542.7/km^{2}).

The racial make-up of the city was 81.6% White, 2.4% Black or African American, 2.2% Native American, 2.0% Asian, 0.1% Pacific Islander, 9.3% from other races, and 1.3% from two or more races. 24.0% of the population were Hispanic or Latino of any race.

There were 146,643 households, out of which 33.4% had children under the age of 18 living with them, 52.7% were married couples living together, 10.6% had a female householder with no husband present, and 31.9% were non-families. 24.2% of all households were made up of individuals, and 9.1% had someone living alone who was 65 years of age or older. The average household size was 2.68 and the average family size was 3.20.

The age distribution was 27.3% under 18, 11.2% from 18 to 24, 29.7% from 25 to 44, 18.4% from 45 to 64, and 13.3% who were 65 or older. The median age was 32 years. For every 100 females, there were 98.2 males. For every 100 females age 18 and over, there were 95.6 males.

The median income for a household in the city was $42,817, and the median income for a family was $49,232. Males had a median income of $35,960 versus $27,005 for females. The per capita income for the city was $19,601. About 6.2% of families and 8.9% of the population were below the poverty line, including 10.7% of those under age 18 and 7.1% of those age 65 or over.

== Government ==
The Mesa City Charter of 1967 established a council-manager government consisting of a mayor and six councilmembers who appoint a city manager, city clerk, city attorney, auditor, and magistrates. The city manager administers and staffs various departments. The council can also appoint citizens to advisory boards, commissions, and committees.

In May 1998 voters approved Proposition 100, which created six geographical council districts. Councilmembers are elected to represent these districts for four year terms. The mayor is elected to represent the city at large and also has a four-year term. Both councilmembers and mayors cannot serve more than two consecutive terms. A partial term does not count towards these two consecutive terms; for instance, Mayor John Giles served a partial term from 2014 to 2016 then served two consecutive terms from 2016 to 2024.

=== Political climate ===
In a 2014 study, academic researchers from MIT and UCLA analyzed over a decade's worth of public opinion surveys. They determined that Mesa was the "most conservative American city of more than 250,000 residents". In 2017, the Pew Research Center also determined that Mesa was the most conservative city in the United States.

== Economy ==
=== Top employers ===
According to the city's 2022 Comprehensive Annual Financial Report, the top employers in the city are:

#	Employer	Employees	Percentage of Total City Employment
1	Mesa Public Schools	7,726	4.35%
2	Banner Health	6,826	3.84%
3	The Boeing Company	3,945	2.22%
4	City of Mesa	3,579	2.02%
5	Walmart	3,269	1.84%
6	Fry's Food and Drug	1,371	0.77%
7	DriveTime Automotive Group	1,367	0.77%
8	The Home Depot	1,309	0.74%
9	Maricopa County Community College	1,215	0.68%
10	Gilbert Public Schools	1,004	0.57%

== Cultural attractions ==
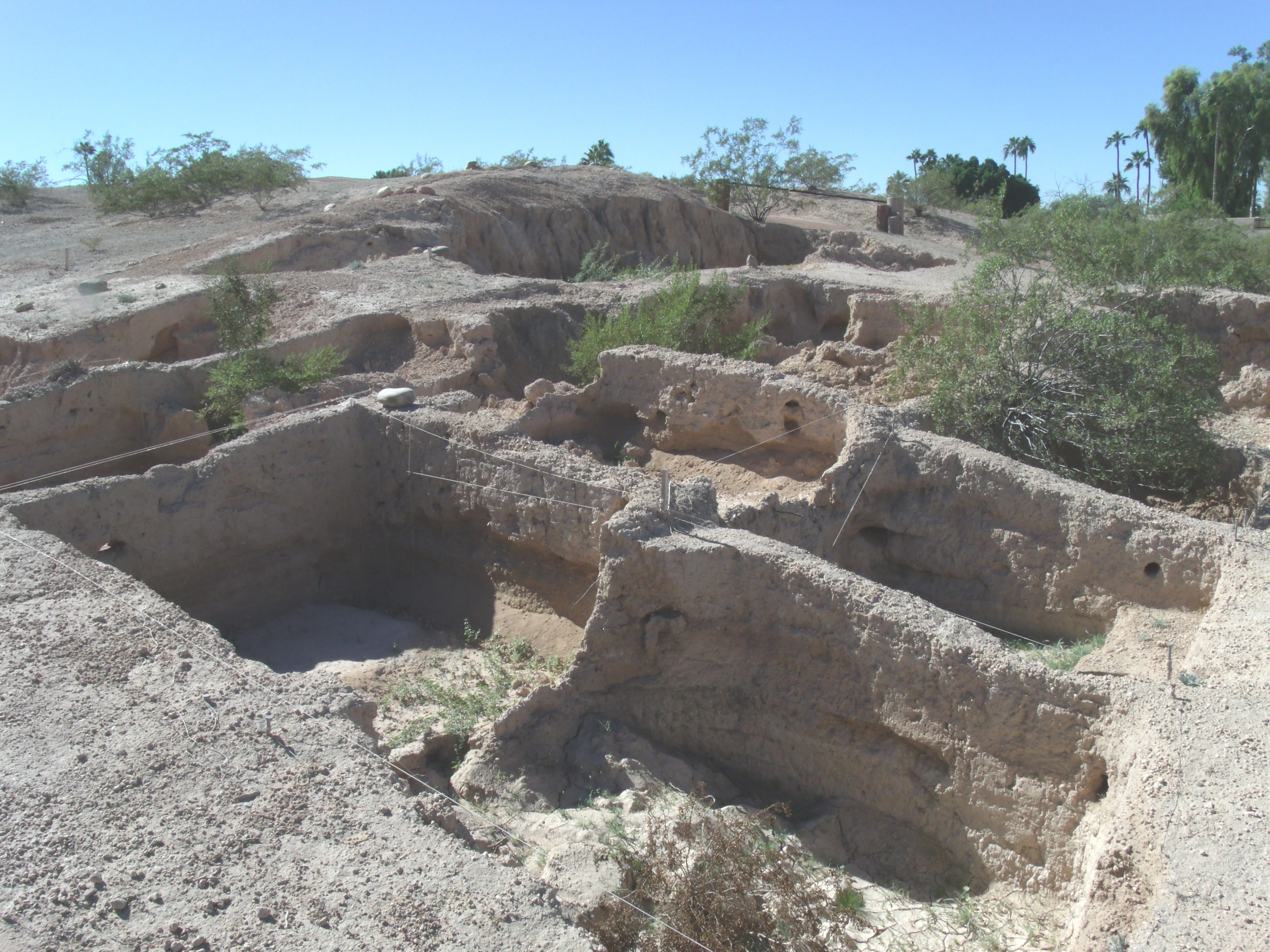
Mesa Grande Ruins

- Hohokam Stadium, home of the Athletics and former home of the Chicago Cubs during the Cactus League
- Sloan Park, the Cactus League spring training home of the Chicago Cubs
- Mesa Arts Center
- Mesa Amphitheater
- Museums
  - I.d.e.a. Museum
  - CAF Airbase Arizona, located at Falcon Field
  - Mesa Contemporary Arts Museum, Mesa Arts Center
  - Mesa Historical Museum
  - Arizona Museum of Natural History
- Archeological sites
  - Mesa Grande Ruins
  - Park of the Canals
- Public libraries
  - Main Library
  - Dobson Ranch Branch
  - Mesa Express Library
  - Red Mountain Branch
- Water parks
  - Golfland Sunsplash waterpark on U.S. 60
- The only highrise in Mesa is the Bank of America (formerly Western Savings) building near Fiesta Mall.
- Organ Stop Pizza, containing the world's largest Wurlitzer organ
- Arizona Athletic Grounds a 320-acre sports and recreation complex

=== Historic properties in Mesa ===
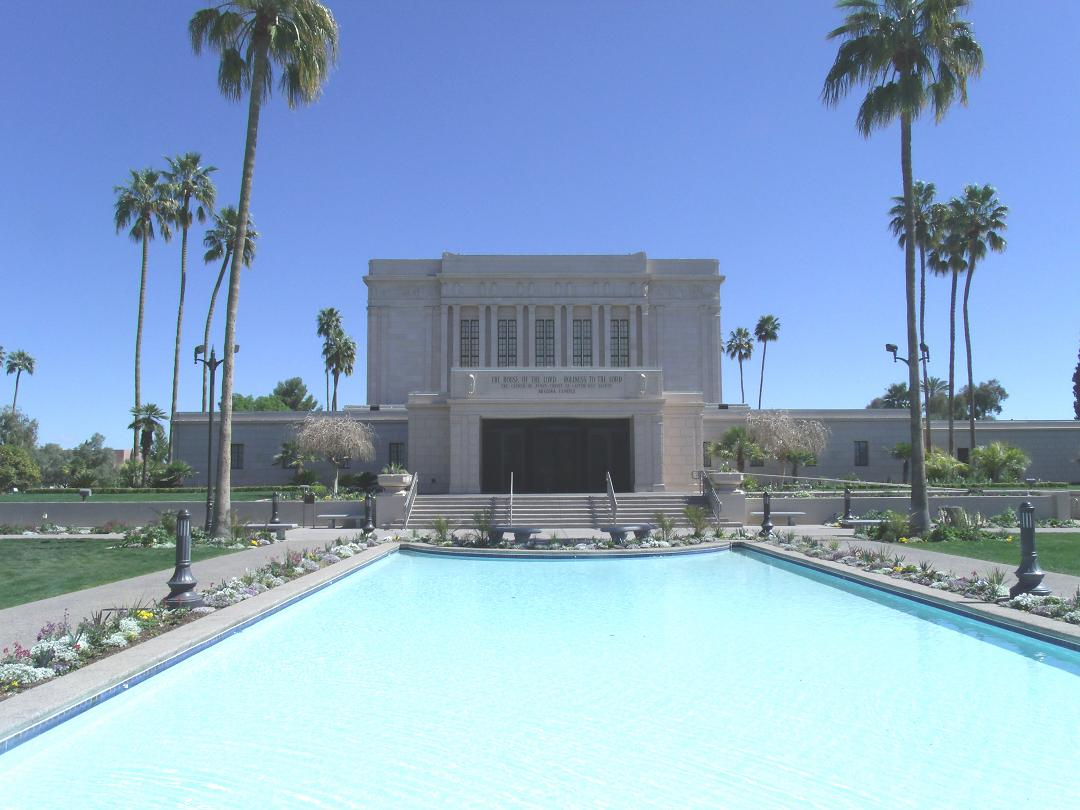
The Mesa Arizona Temple, the namesake of the NRHP's Historic Mesa Temple District

Numerous properties in the city are considered to be historical and have been included either in the National Register of Historic Places or the listings of the Mesa Historic Properties.

== Parks and recreation ==
Mesa has over 2,280 acres of parkland in the city limits. Its largest is Red Mountain Park which spans 1,146 acres. It includes a lake, playgrounds, a basketball court and a cement volleyball court.

=== Golf ===
Mesa is home to numerous championship golf courses, including the original course in town, Mesa Country Club. This course was founded in the late 1940s by the original leaders of the town.

=== West Mesa ===
The abandoned Fiesta Mall is located in West Mesa and owned by Westcor. Its anchors were Sears and Best Buy. It is located near several shopping centers, Mesa's Bank of America, and other retail stores, banks, and restaurants. Though deserted, a refurbishment and expansion of the mall has been planned.

Mesa Riverview is an outdoor destination retail center in the northwestern corner of the city, near Loop 202 and Dobson Road. The center includes 1,300,000 square feet (120,000 m^{2}) of retail space.

=== East Mesa ===
Located in East Mesa is Superstition Springs Business Park. It includes the Superstition Springs Center, a shopping mall owned by Macerich. It features an outdoor amphitheatre and fountain which convert to a stage. Anchor stores at the mall are Dillard's and JCPenney. Mission Community Church, previously known as Superstition Springs Community Church, was initially named after this business park.

== Education ==
Almost all of the city of Mesa is served by public schools operated by Mesa Public Schools; however, the southern portion is served by Gilbert Public Schools, the Higley Unified School District and the Queen Creek Unified School District, and a small western portion is served by the Tempe Elementary School District and the Tempe Union High School District.

Pilgrim Lutheran School is a Christian Pre-K-8 school of the Wisconsin Evangelical Lutheran Synod in Mesa.

More than 40,000 students are enrolled in more than 10 colleges and universities located in Mesa. Mesa is home to Mesa Community College, the largest of the Maricopa Community Colleges, which enrolls over 24,000 full and part-time students, and Chandler–Gilbert Community College. The Polytechnic campus of Arizona State University lies in southeast Mesa. This satellite campus enrolls over 6,000 undergraduate and graduate students in scientific and engineering fields. A. T. Still University operates an Osteopathic Medical School in Mesa.

Private for-profit institutions include Arizona College, Carrington College, DeVry University, Pima Medical Institute, and CAE Global Academy Phoenix. Arizona State University opened the Media and Immersive eXperience Center in the ASU at Mesa City Center complex in 2022, offering programs from the Herberger Institute for Design and Arts including a film school with media production facilities and a theater.

After launching a higher education initiative in 2012, Mesa became home to branch campuses of five private, liberal arts institutions: Albright College, Westminster College, Benedictine University, Upper Iowa University and Wilkes University. Albright College and Westminster College are no longer in the city, and Wilkes University has moved entirely online.

== Transportation ==
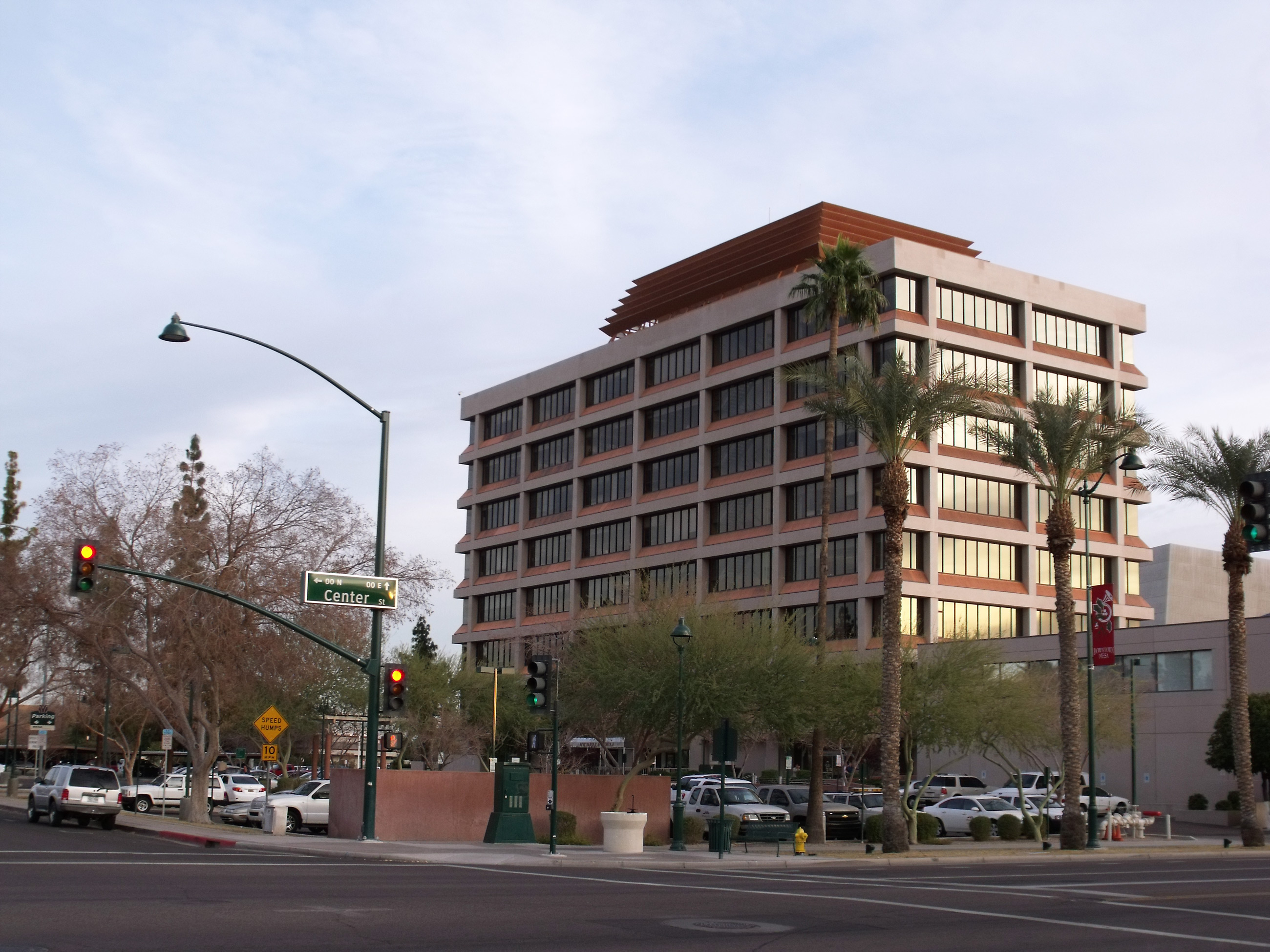
Mesa City Hall in downtown Mesa

Several area freeways serve the Mesa area, such as U.S. Route 60, locally known as the Superstition Freeway, which runs between Apache Junction and Phoenix. It is also served by SR 87 and bypass loops Loop 101, which skirts the western city limits as the Price Freeway, and Loop 202, which bypasses the city on the north and east. The main east–west arterial road in Mesa is Main Street (former US 60/70/80/89), serving Downtown Mesa. The primary north–south arterials include Country Club Drive, Gilbert Road, and Power Road.

Public transportation in Mesa is provided by Valley Metro via bus and light rail (Valley Metro Rail). The light rail section in Mesa spans about four miles from Sycamore/Main St. in the west of the city, through downtown to Gilbert/Main St. Until July 2008, Mesa was the largest U.S. city with no public transit service on Sundays. The city has Sunday service available on Routes 40-Apache/Main, 45-Broadway, 61-Southern, 96-Dobson, 108-Elliot, 112-Country Club/Arizona, 156-Chandler/Williams Field, and 184-Power. Up until the final years of Southern Pacific passenger railroad service, the Sunset Limited passenger train used to make stops in Mesa.

Air service in the city is provided by two airports. Falcon Field, located in the northeastern part of the area, was established as a training field for British RAF pilots during World War II and was transferred to the city at the end of the war. Falcon Field has 605 aircraft based there. Boeing builds the AH-64 Apache attack helicopter at a facility adjoining Falcon Field. Phoenix-Mesa Gateway Airport is located in the far southeastern area of the city and provides alternate but limited air service when compared to Sky Harbor International Airport. Phoenix-Mesa Gateway was formerly Williams Gateway Airport, and before that, Williams Air Force Base, which closed in 1993. Williams Gateway was announced as a new Focus City for Allegiant Air. Service started October 25, 2007.

== Healthcare ==
The public hospital system, Valleywise Health (formerly Maricopa Integrated Health System), operates Valleywise Community Health Center – Mesa and Valleywise Behavioral Health Center – Mesa.

== Notable people ==
- Jim Adkins, vocalist and lead guitarist of Jimmy Eat World
- Beau Allred, professional baseball pitcher
- Janice Merrill Allred, author
- Helen Andelin, author
- Tyson Apostol, reality television star
- John Beck, professional football player
- Art Bisch, race car driver
- Mike Brown, professional basketball coach
- Marcus Brunson, professional sprinter
- Dustinn Craig (White Mountain Apache/Diné), filmmaker and skateboarder
- Bruce Crandall, Medal of Honor pilot, 1st Cavalry Veteran of Ia Drang November 14, 1965
- Jonathan Dean, ambassador, representative to the Mutual and Balanced Force Reductions
- Jagger Eaton, professional skateboarder, youngest X Games competitor, and Olympian
- Julie Ertz, world champion soccer player
- Kody Funderburk, professional baseball player for the Minnesota Twins
- Austin Gibbs, musician
- George Nicholas Goodman, pharmacist and former mayor of Mesa
- Max Hall, professional football player
- Mickey Hatcher, professional baseball player
- Carl Hayden, Arizona senator, and its first representative in the House; died in Mesa in 1972
- Todd Heap, professional football player
- Jamar Hunt, professional football player
- Autumn Hurlbert, actress
- Misty Hyman, Olympic gold medalist in swimming
- Troy Kotsur, Academy Award-winning deaf actor
- Rudy Lavik, college basketball coach
- Mike Lee, U.S. senator for Utah
- Albie Lopez, professional baseball player
- Brad Mills, professional baseball pitcher
- Ernesto Miranda, conviction overturned by the Supreme Court of the United States in Miranda v. Arizona creating the Miranda warning, buried in the City of Mesa Cemetery
- Carolyn Morris, professional baseball player (A.A.G.P.B.L.)
- Buck Owens, singer, member of the Country Music Hall of Fame
- Rudy Owens, professional baseball player
- John Jacob Rhodes, politician, House Minority Leader of the U.S. House of Representatives
- John Jacob Rhodes III, politician, former member of the U.S. House of Representatives
- Larry Schweikart, author
- Jake Shears, lead male singer for the pop band Scissor Sisters
- Vai Sikahema, professional football player, General Authority the Church of Jesus Christ of Latter-day Saints
- Trevor Spangenberg, soccer player
- Lynn Toler, judge for Divorce Court
- Kelly Townsend, Arizona state representative, Legislative District 16 (including parts of East Mesa)
- Don Taylor Udall, state legislator and judge
- Tara VanFlower, singer, songwriter of Lycia
- Brooke White, singer-songwriter and fifth place finalist on the seventh season of American Idol
- Danny White, professional football player, Arizona Athlete of the Century (20th)
- Wilford "Whizzer" White, professional football player
- Vance Wilson, former New York Mets catcher and current coach for the Kansas City Royals
- Roger L. Worsley, educator, formerly with Mesa High School and Mesa Community College

== Sister cities ==
Mesa has five sister cities, as designated by Sister Cities International:

- Burnaby, British Columbia, Canada
- Caraz, Ancash, Peru
- Guaymas, Sonora, Mexico
- Kaiping, Guangdong, China
- Upper Hutt, Wellington, New Zealand

== See also ==
- The Church of Jesus Christ of Latter-day Saints in Arizona
- City of Mesa Cemetery
- Life Teen
- Mesa Distance Learning Program
- Shooting of Daniel Shaver
- Tri-City Pavilions
