= Pennsylvania Mock Trial Competition =

The Pennsylvania Mock Trial Competition is a high school Mock Trial competition in Pennsylvania sponsored by the Pennsylvania Bar Association Young Lawyers Division. The winning school of the state finals advances to the National High School Mock Trial Championship. The Pennsylvania Mock Trial Competition first began in 1984. The case material is usually released early in November, within the first two weeks. Typically, 250 to 300 teams compete each year, making it one of the largest state competitions in the country. The Statewide Championship is held each year in late March at the Dauphin County Courthouse in Harrisburg, Pennsylvania and consists of the top 12 to 16 teams in the state. As a result of the COVID-19 Pandemic, the 2020 Statewide Championship was cancelled and the entire 2021 and 2022 competition seasons were held virtually.

== Trial format ==
=== Opening statements ===
A trial starts with a 5-minute opening statement by the Plaintiff/Prosecution (depending on whether the case is civil or criminal, respectively), which is immediately followed by a 5-minute opening statement by the defense.

=== Witness testimony ===
After opening statements, the plaintiff/prosecution calls its first witness. The plaintiff/prosecution conducts a direct examination of the witness, and then the defense conducts a cross-examination of the same witness. After cross-examination, the plaintiff/prosecution has the opportunity to conduct a redirect examination of the witness. If they do, the defense is given the chance to recross the witness. After either all four types of exams have been conducted or one party abstains from doing redirect or recross respectively, the witness steps down from the stand. This process is then repeated for two more plaintiff/prosecution witnesses. With the conclusion of testimony from the third plaintiff witness, the plaintiff rests. The defense then calls three witnesses in the same manner described above for the plaintiff/prosecution.

Each team has 30 minutes for witness testimony, including all direct, cross, redirect, and recross examinations conducted by counsel of that team. (The clock does stop, however, for a variety of reasons, including, but not limited to, objections and parts of the process for entering exhibits.)

=== Closing arguments ===
Once the third defense witness has finished giving testimony, the defense gives their closing argument. Like opening statements, closing arguments are limited to 5 minutes apiece. After the defense closes, the plaintiff/prosecution gives its closing statement. This is a deviation from standard courtroom procedure, in which the plaintiff/prosecution closes first, followed by the defense, after which the plaintiff/prosecution may offer a rebuttal. In Mock Trial, this deviation allows each team to have the opportunity to speak first, one for opening statements and one for closing arguments. Barring any disputes being raised, the second closing argument marks the conclusion of the trial, and the jury is dismissed to tally points.

=== Scoring and winner ===
Each member of the jury scores each part of the trial based on specific scoring categories, such as the flow of a direct examination or the effectiveness of a cross-examination. Each opening statement or closing argument is worth a maximum of 10 points. Each direct or cross-examination is also worth, at most, 10 points. Each witness can earn a maximum of 10 points independent of any other points from the direct examination. There is one team evaluation category scored at the end of the trial, valued at a maximum of 10 points. Therefore, each team can earn up to 120 points during the trial.

On any juror's ballot, the team with more points is the winner of that scoresheet. Each juror indicates which team he/she would choose to win if the points of the scoresheet after any penalties are assessed, adds up to a tie. Each scoresheet is worth one vote. Whichever team receives more votes is declared the winner of the trial. If there is an even number of jurors and they have a split decision, the team with total points on all of the scoresheets is the winner.

== Past cases ==
Year	Name	Subject of Case
1997	Marshall v. Priestley College	Civil Liability
1998	The Commonwealth of Pennsylvania v. Walker	Conspiracy and Delivery of a Controlled Substance
1999	Smith v. Lorcin	Negligence
2000	The Commonwealth of Pennsylvania v. Krupp	Voluntary Manslaughter
2001	Gorey v. Bushing	Civil Liability
2002	The Commonwealth of Pennsylvania v. McGrath	Arson
2003	Day v. Knight	Negligence
2004	The Commonwealth of Pennsylvania v. Max Ability	Theft
2005	Gallo v. Urbanski	Civil Liability (and First Amendment Rights)
2006	The Commonwealth of Pennsylvania v. Olson	Third-Degree Murder
2007	Anderson v. Williams	Cyberstalking
2008	The Commonwealth of Pennsylvania v. Sinclair	Kidnapping
2009	Hansbra v. Plane's Park & Polish, LLC	Negligence
2010	The Commonwealth of Pennsylvania v. Legan Arabach	Third-Degree Murder
2011	The Estate of Simone Langston v. Dr. Lefu Harrison	Competency to Consent
2012	The Wisawe Chapter of Friends of Bog Turtles v. ZenoPharma, Inc.	Critical Habitat Determination
2013	The Commonwealth of Pennsylvania v. Tatum Zillias	Third-Degree Murder
2014	The Estate of Jordan Simon v. Ruffed Grouse High School	Wrongful Death
2015	The Commonwealth of Pennsylvania v. Harper Marmalard	First-Degree Murder
2016	Lilienthal Insurance, Inc. v. Natural Habitat Preserve	Insurance Indemnification
2017	The Commonwealth of Pennsylvania v. Taylor Edsel	Arson
2018	Silva Morel v. Tiger Tail Technologies	Adverse Employment Action
2019	The Commonwealth of Pennsylvania v. Rae Shafer, M.D.	Drug Delivery Resulting in Death
2020	Addison Babbage v. Ruffed Grouse High School	Negligence
2021	Estate of George Romero v. Ashley Williams	Wrongful Death
2022	The Commonwealth of Pennsylvania v. Edi Arcaro	First-Degree Murder
2023	Estate of Alejandro Desafios v. Storm Chase LLC	Gross Negligence
2024	The Commonwealth of Pennsylvania v. Addison Booker	First-Degree Murder and Conspiracy to Commit Murder
2025	The Commonwealth of Pennsylvania v. Connie MacLeod	Burglary and Grand Larceny
2026	Bo Bridger, an Incapacitated Person, by Jamie Bridger, Guardian v. Dr. Colter’s Family Medicine, LLP	Negligence
2027	The Commonwealth of Pennsylvanyia v. Tatum Fey	First-Degree Murder and Attempted Murder

== State Finals Results ==
Year	Winner	Place at Nationals	Runner-up
1987	Central Cambria High School		
1988	Bensalem High School	4	Bishop Carrol High School
1989	Bensalem High School		
1990	Quigley Catholic High School		Delone Catholic High School
1991	Scranton Preparatory High School	5	Kiski Area High School
1992	Norristown Area High School		J. P. McCaskey High School
1993	North Pocono High School	26	Bensalem High School
1994	Quigley Catholic High School	9	North Pocono High School
1995	Quigley Catholic High School	20	North Pocono High School
1996	Quigley Catholic High School	10	North Allegheny High School
1997	Overbrook High School		Seton LaSalle High School
1998	Punxsutawney Area High School	30	George Washington Carver High School of Engineering & Science
1999	Julia R. Masterman High School	15	Quigley Catholic High School
2000	Quigley Catholic High School	21	Mount Saint Joseph Academy
2001	Greensburg-Salem High School	18	Devon Preparatory High School
2002	Quigley Catholic High School	2	Gateway High School
2003	Gateway High School	22	Quigley Catholic High School
2004	Overbrook High School	32	Oliver High School
2005	Greensburg-Salem High School	12	Scranton Preparatory High School
2006	Greensburg-Salem High School	4	Julia R. Masterman High School
2007	Greensburg-Salem High School	14	Scranton Preparatory High School
2008	Overbrook High School	15	Greensburg-Salem High School
2009	Central High School (Blair Co.)	10	Overbrook High School
2010	Scranton Preparatory High School	10	B. Reed Henderson High School
2011	Wyoming Seminary High School	6	St. Joseph's Preparatory School
2012	Scranton Preparatory High School	10	J.P. McCaskey High School
2013	Quigley Catholic High School	16	Greensburg-Salem High School
2014	Altoona Area High School	22	Roman Catholic High School
2015	Quigley Catholic High School	13	Roman Catholic High School
2016	Quigley Catholic High School	18	Wyoming Seminary High School
2017	Greensburg-Salem High School	30	Roman Catholic High School
2018	Wyoming Seminary High School	11	Penn-Trafford High School
2019	Holy Cross High School	9	Germantown Friends School
2020	Cancelled due to the ongoing COVID-19 Pandemic		
2021	Abington Heights High School	24	Nazareth Area High School
2022	Abington Heights High School	15	St. Joseph's Preparatory School
2023	Roman Catholic High School	19	Cumberland Valley High School
2024	Abington Heights High School	1	Spring Grove Area High School
2025	Central High School (Phila. Co.)	20	Lower Merion High School
2026	Roman Catholic High School	8	Nazareth Area High School

== Schools with multiple state finals appearances ==
Appearances	Team	Wins	Losses
11	Quigley Catholic High School	9	2
7	Greensburg-Salem High School	5	2
5	Scranton Preparatory High School	3	2
5	Roman Catholic High School	2	3
4	Overbrook High School	3	1
3	Abington Heights High School	3	0
3	Wyoming Seminary High School	2	1
3	Bensalem High School	2	1
3	North Pocono High School	1	2
2	Gateway High School	1	1
2	Julia R. Masterman High School	1	1
2	St. Joseph's Preparatory School	0	2
2	J. P. McCaskey High School	0	2
2	Nazareth Area High School	0	2
