= QCHS =

QCHS may refer to:

- Queen Creek High School, a public secondary school in Queen Creek, Arizona
- Quigley Catholic High School, a defunct high school in Baden, Pennsylvania
