= Rittenhouse Elementary School =

Museum in Queen Creek, Maricopa County, Arizona, US

- Rittenhouse Elementary School (San Tan Historical Society Museum)
- U.S. National Register of Historic Places
- Arizona Register of Historic Places
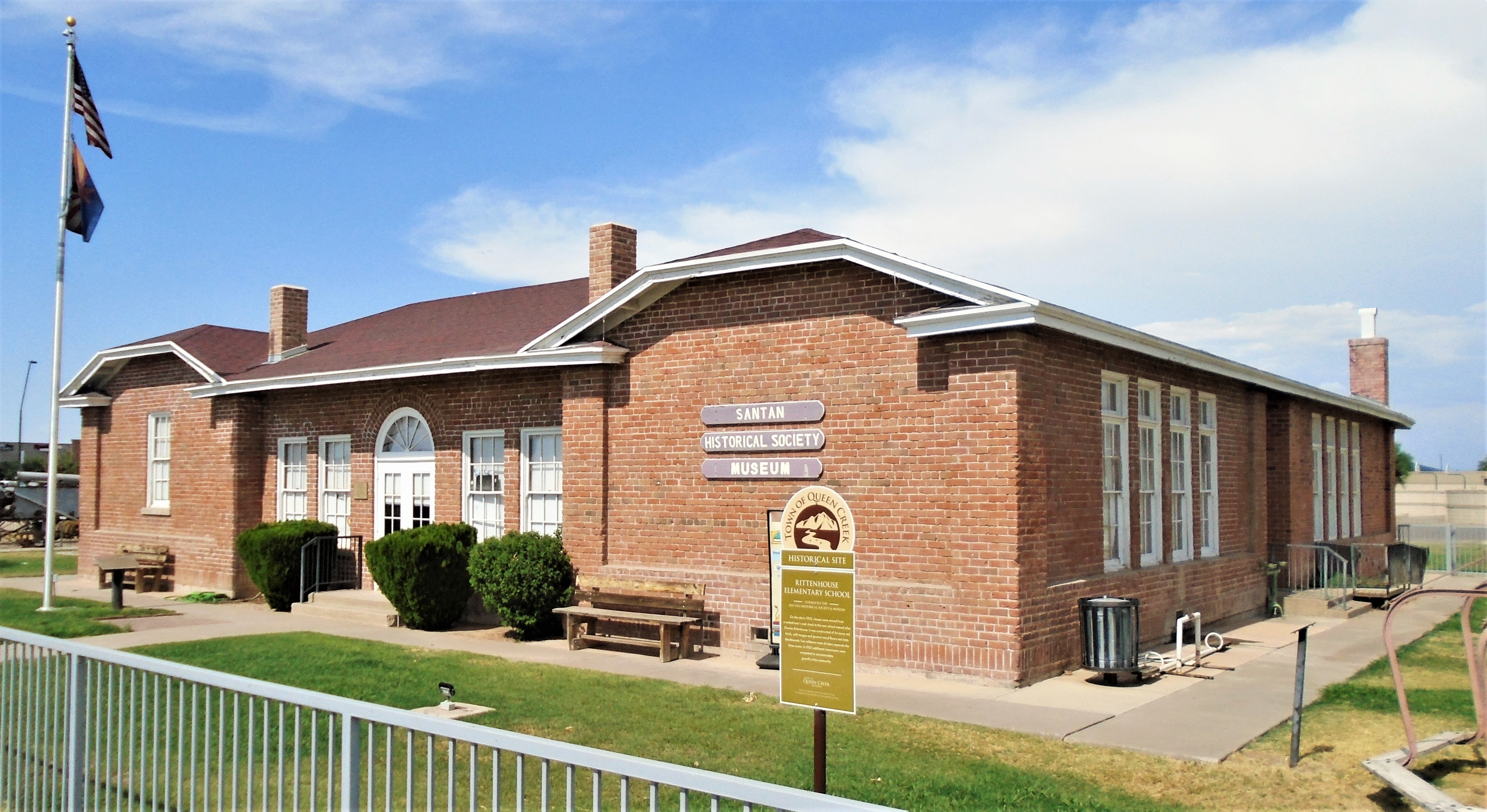
- (2021)

- Location within Arizona Location within the United States
- Location: 200425 S. Ellsworth Rd., Queen Creek, Arizona
- Built: 1924-1925
- Architectural style: Spanish Colonial Revival
- Restored: beginning 2002
- Restored by: San Tan Historical Society
- Website: www.santanhistorical.org
- NRHP reference No.: 98000053

Significant dates
- Added to NRHP: February 5, 1998
- Designated ARHP: 1990

The Rittenhouse Elementary School, now the San Tan Historical Society Museum, is a well-preserved historic school located at 20425 South Ellsworth Road at the intersection with East Queen Creek Road in Queen Creek, Arizona. It was built from 1924 to 1925 in the Spanish Colonial Revival style, opened for classes in 1926, and closed in 1982, after which it was used for storage by the Queen Creek Unified School District.

In 1990, the building was placed on the Arizona Register of Historical Places. On June 21, 1994, the historical society signed an agreement with the school district, which allowed them to oversee the building's restoration and start a historical museum. The society immediately began the National Register of Historic Places (NRHP) nomination process for the building, while simultaneously raising funds for its restoration. This application was approved, and the building was listed in 1998.

== History ==
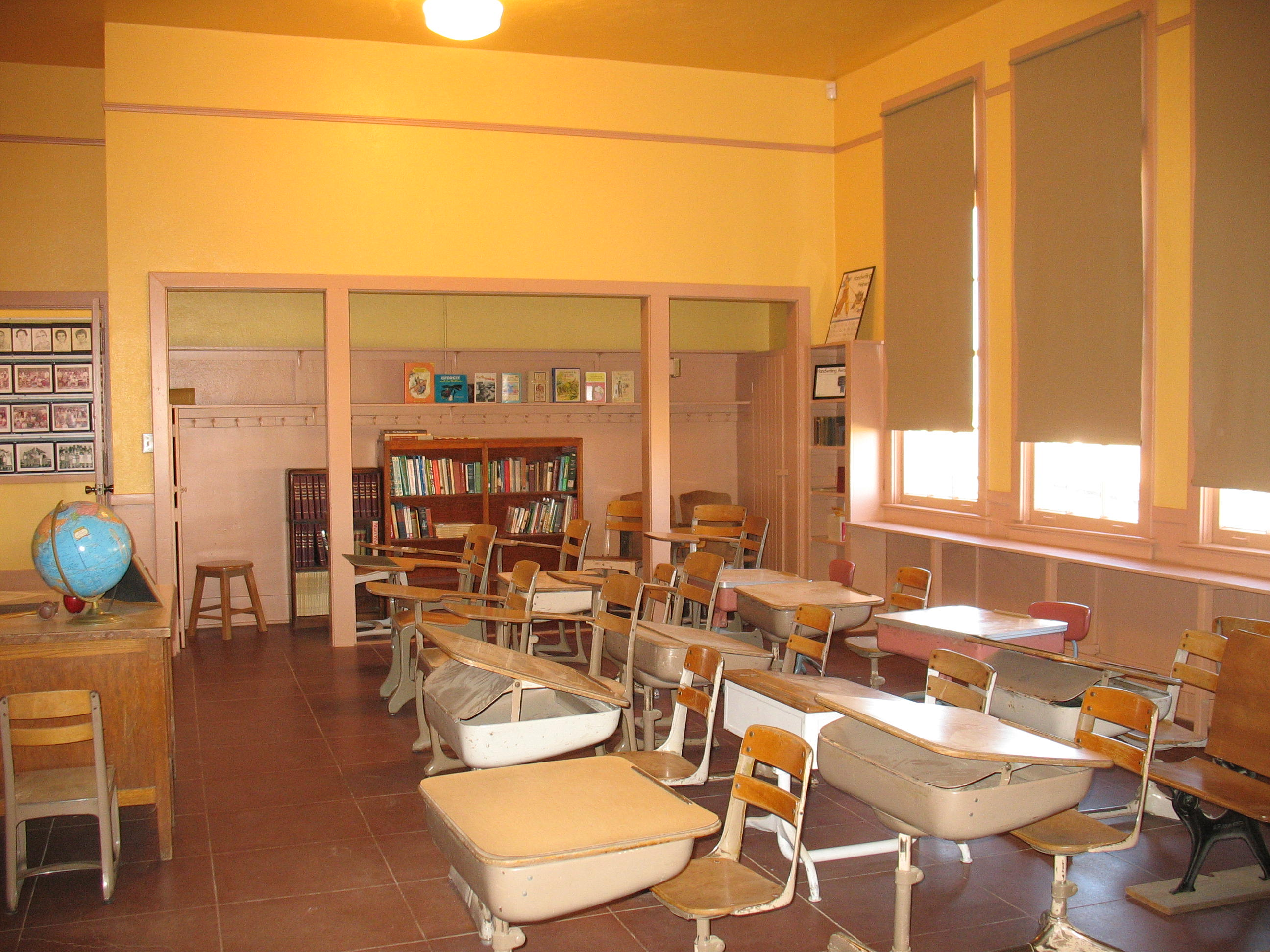
Classroom at Rittenhouse Elementary School

From 1920 to 1922, the first classes in the Rittenhouse/Queen Creek area were held in a small board-and-batten building that had previously been used as a cook shack by employees of G. R. "Gid" Duncan. Duncan was a partner of land developer Charles Rittenhouse, after whom the school was named. Duncan allowed the use of the building and land for the school. In early 1923, school officials acquired the use of a wooden church building, constructed circa 1921, which served as the community school until 1925.

With increasing development and population growth in the 1920s, area school officials realized that a permanent building was needed. In 1924, construction began on the new structure, a three-room, U-shaped red brick building. Although completed in 1925, the first classes in the new school were not held until 1926.

Initially only classes for English-speaking students were held in the new Rittenhouse Elementary School. In the meantime, the wooden church building continued to be used as a school for children of Mexican descent, where they were taught English in preparation for entering the main classes. The Mexican-American children's school schedule was different than that of the other children, who didn't attend school until after the cotton harvest was complete, usually sometime in February. Sometimes as many as 60 students were taught in a single room.

In 1947, the residents changed the name of the community from Rittenhouse to Queen Creek, but the school retained its original name.

In 1948, school district officials realized that population growth in the area necessitated an expansion of capacity. In February 1948, officials authorized a bond issue for construction of a new building. Completed in 1952, the new school (name it) operated simultaneously with the older campus until its closure in 1982.

== Historical significance ==
The Rittenhouse Elementary School building was nominated to the NRHP under criterion A, for its association "with events that have made a significant contribution to the broad patterns of history."

More specifically, Rittenhouse is significant as an example of the broad pattern of centralizing rural education in Arizona prior to World War II. The building also retains its integrity of historical setting and appearance, both on the interior and exterior. The Rittenhouse Elementary School is also the only extant historical school building in Queen Creek.

=== Historical context ===
In the early twentieth century, increased population, better transportation, concentrated development, and the desire for improved educational facilities contributed to the centralization of rural Arizona schools and the construction of the Rittenhouse Elementary School. Centralization of rural schools was emphasized on a national level through the 1930s, as evidenced by the 1935 report by the U.S. Commissioner of Education stressing the need to reorganize the school system. To address this need, Rittenhouse officials and the local school district decided that, although other schools existed in nearby communities, it was more efficient and economical to create a new school within the students' community rather than transport them to existing schools in distant communities. This pattern of rural school centralization was carried out throughout Arizona through 1940, and mirrored efforts in other rural communities throughout the United States in the first half of the twentieth century.

=== Structural context ===
The interior of the building maintains a high degree of integrity with most of the original fabric intact. Most interior modifications have been cosmetic rather than affecting the physical structure. Apart from reconstructing the stage, no major repair or restoration has been necessary.

Several well-preserved interior structural elements contribute to the unique and historical character of the building. The original wood-trimmed alcoves — present in all four classrooms — contain coat hooks, cubby holes, and a storage closets. The original slate blackboards are intact, and text from the last day of classes in 1982 has been preserved. The floors in the original portion of the building are stained maple tongue-and-groove, and the floors in the 1930s-era classrooms are colored concrete. All of the original doors are intact, but much of the historic door furniture was replaced over the years. The plumbing fixtures within the boys' restroom may be original, while the fixtures within the girls' restroom are not.

== Architecture ==
Notable features of the building include transom windows and tongue-and-groove maple floors. The interior includes recessed roll-down doors that can be retracted or engaged to change the room configuration, a small wooden stage, and slate chalkboards in the classrooms. Until completion of indoor restrooms in 1937, pupils and school staff used an outhouse located behind the school.

The single-story Rittenhouse Elementary School was built in the Spanish Colonial Revival style. The building was built on a concrete foundation with a crawl space beneath the building; the brick walls rest directly on the wooden floor. Because the floor is raised, three sets of original concrete steps (with three steps each) provide access to the building at the main and two side entryways. Sometime after 2000, wheelchair ramps were added to both side entrances.

The large windows in the classrooms are in the "six-over-six" style, with operable transoms above. The wooden front entry doors are original, and also surmounted by a semi-circular transom window (UK = fanlight). Brick pilasters are located at the corners of the building, and serve to accentuate the eave returns above. The building contains several brick chimneys with corbelling at the top. Character-defining elements include a wood-trimmed alcove containing coat hooks, cubby holes, and a storage closet. The well-preserved original slate chalkboards are still intact.

A unique feature within the auditorium space is the two overhead roll-up doors, which remain intact. These doors allow the central auditorium space to triple in size by connecting to the adjacent classrooms. The stage was accessed from the classroom hallway by a narrow door, approximately 16 by 48 inches (41 cm × 122 cm) in size and elevated 24 inches (61 cm) off of the floor. While the original stage door exists, the stage in the museum today is a reconstruction, the original having been removed years ago to allow home economics classes. The tile work in both restrooms is original, as are the boys' lockers.

The floors in the original portion of the building are stained maple tongue and groove, while the floors in the later classroom additions are colored concrete with a 2 by 2 feet (0.61 m × 0.61 m) square score pattern. Aside from the two side entrances, all the original doors are intact, but much of the historic door furniture has been replaced over the years. The interior walls are plastered and painted, and painted wood trim is present throughout the building.

=== Historical modifications ===
In 1936–1937, the school district took advantage of federal Public Works Administration funds to add two classrooms, hallways, and restrooms. Heat for the rooms was provided by a boiler system, which replaced the wood-burning stoves used in the original classrooms. The intact boiler room is located in a small subfloor area underneath the boys' restroom. The rooms were eventually equipped with oil heaters, and eventually gas heaters hung from the ceilings.

The 1936-1937 classroom additions match the original building both in style and materials, and do not detract from the historical integrity of the building. During the modern era (post-1946), the open space between the classroom wings was filled in to create shower rooms, which were accessed through the existing restrooms as well as from the building's exterior. This infill is not visible from the street view of the building, and does not detract from the overall historical feeling and appearance of the building. The stage was dismantled sometime during the modern period (post-1946) to allow for more classroom space.

Additional changes occurred to the building in the mid-1950s, when a combination shower and locker room was added to the rear, or east side, of the building. By 1955, the Rittenhouse Elementary School, which was now called "Old Main," was the centerpiece of the community of Queen Creek. Flooding in 1966 damaged the wooden floor; the flooring near the main entry is still warped as a result.

=== Restoration ===
In 2002, the San Tan Historical Society took over the Rittenhouse Elementary School, and began the long process of restoring the building. Although structurally sound, more than 70 years of cosmetic alterations had to be undone in order to restore the building to its original appearance. Numerous layers of paint were removed to expose the original red brick exterior. The paint removal revealed hundreds of graffiti etched into the bricks by former students; this graffiti provides an invaluable historical record of the school.

Modern acoustic tile was removed from the interior ceiling to reveal the original plastered ceiling, which was restored and painted to match the original interior colors. The stage was reconstructed in the early 2000s. The wooden floor is undergoing research and analysis for restoration by a local historical architectural firm. Repointing of the nearly 90-year-old brick mortar is being conducted by a local historical preservation expert.

== San Tan Historical Museum ==
The Rittenhouse Elementary School/San Tan Historical Society Museum continues to serve as an important focal point for the community of Queen Creek. The history of the school and the community are the focus of the museum. The school grounds display some of the original playground equipment. Antique farm equipment, which pays homage to the agricultural history of Queen Creek, is also displayed around the building's exterior. Inside the museum are permanent and changing exhibits reflecting the history of the school and the community, a small lending library focusing on the history of Queen Creek and the surrounding area, and numerous historical photographs of the school and its students.
