= Kevin Popović =

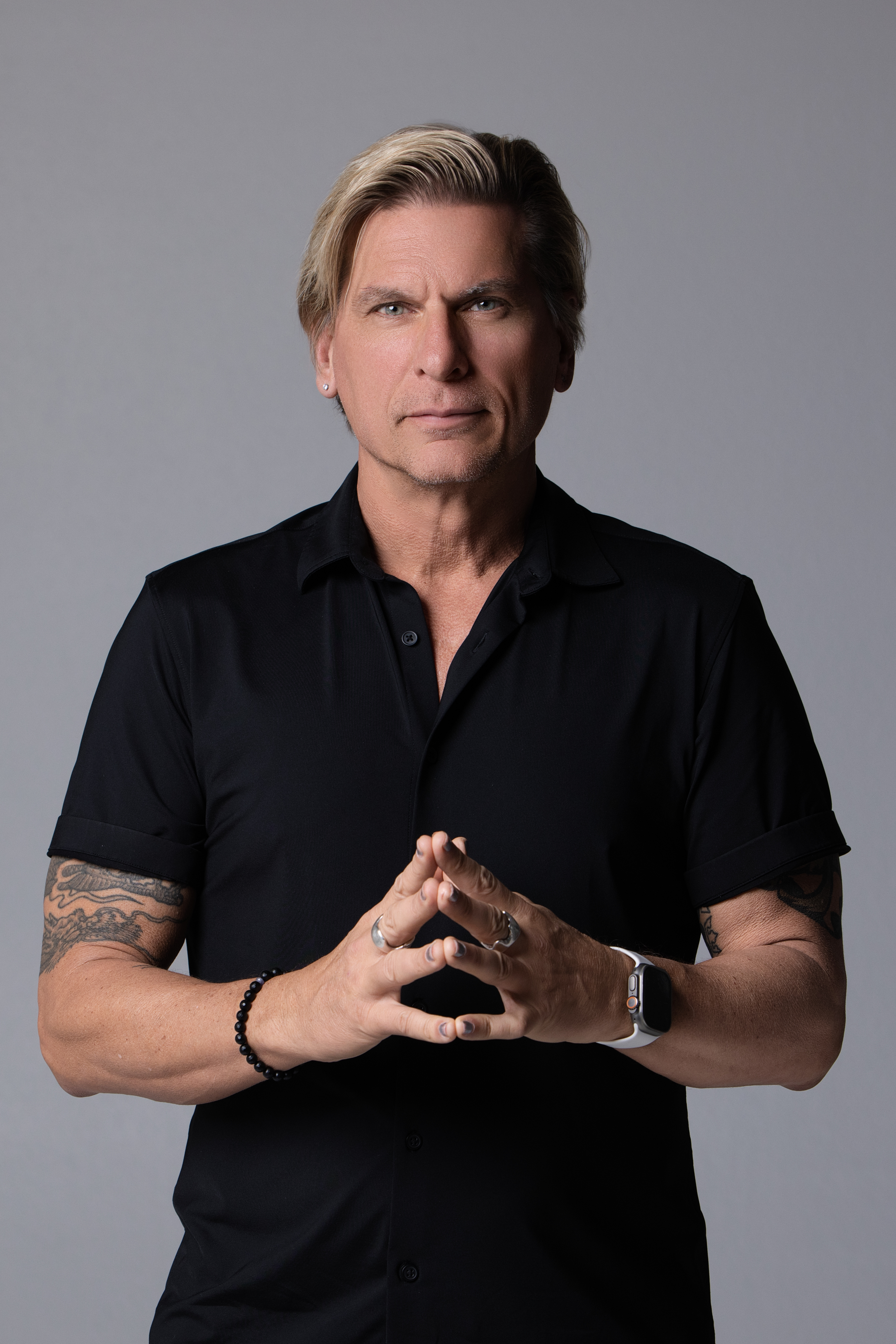
- Born: July 4, 1964 (age 62); Pittsburgh, Pennsylvania, US
- Education: Duquesne University (B.S. in Communications and Psychology, M.A. in Multimedia Technology, Doctoral studies in Instructional Technologies)
- Occupations: Author, educator, entrepreneur, communications strategist
- Years active: 1990–present
- Website: kevinpopovic.com

Kevin Popović (born July 4, 1964) is an American author, teacher, and entrepreneur. He is the founder and CEO of Ideahaus and Market Ready Index, a predictive analytics platform for optimizing integrated marketing communications. Popović also served as the inaugural Director of ZIP Idea Lab, part of the Zahn Innovation Platform, and Zahn Chair of Creativity and Innovation at San Diego State University. He has held academic roles at Duquesne University, San Diego State University, and University of California San Diego.

== Early life and education ==
Popović was born in Pittsburgh and graduated from Quigley Catholic High School in 1982. Popović graduated from Pittsburgh's Duquesne University with a Bachelor of Arts in Communications and Psychology.

== Career ==
After graduating, Popović established the creative communications agency Ideahaus. In 2015 he launched the marketing-analytics platform Market Ready Index, which scores corporate communications against sector benchmarks. He founded The Idea Guy, delivering programs, workshops and training to corporate, non-profitand higher-education clients.

Popović joined the faculty of SDSU's Fowler College of Business and years later became the inaugural director of the university's ZIP Idea Lab. He was also part of the UC San Diego Design Lab SPUR undergraduate-research initiative.

Popović's public presentations include a 2017 TEDxSDSU talk titled "How Creativity Can Change the World, One Bad Drawing at a Time", and a keynote on artificial intelligence and innovation for the Gulf Coast Business Council's State of the Coast Symposium in 2025. Popović's work has earned recognition from the San Diego Business Journal, where he was a finalist for the Top Tech Awards in 2020 and for CEO of the Year in 2025. In 2015, he was listed among the 15 Most Influential Educators in Digital Marketing.

In 2025, Popović became part of the LEADING/DATALIS Project, a collaborative initiative focused on advancing professional education.

== Bibliography ==
=== Books ===
- Popović, Kevin (2013). 20YEARS Communications: 20 Leaders, 20 Questions, 100’s of Lessons. Transmedia Books. ISBN 978-0-9895550-4-3.
- Popović, Kevin (2014). A View from the Top: The Evolution of Marketing and the Customer Journey. Incite Summit West (e-book).
- Popović, Kevin; Vanshur, Ryan (2016). Creating Engagement in the Classroom: Understanding the Challenges of the Modern Learning Environment. Amazon Digital Services (Kindle ed.).
- Popović, Kevin (2016). Satellite Marketing: Using Social Media to Create Engagement. Taylor & Francis. ISBN 978-1-4822-5614-2.

=== Selected journal articles ===
- Popović, K.; Smith, D. C.; Hellebusch, S. J. (2013). "Attitudes on the use of social media in healthcare communications." Journal of Communication in Healthcare. 6 (1): 22–28. doi:10.1179/1753807612Y.0000000029
- Popović, K.; Smith, C. (2010). "Tweeting @DoctorWelby: Practical examples of social media in healthcare.” Journal of Communication in Healthcare. 3 (2): 138–151. doi:10.1179/175380710X12813488575925
