= Higley, Arizona =

- Unincorporated community
- Location of Higley in Maricopa County, shown within corporate limits of Gilbert
- Coordinates: 33°18′26″N 111°43′13″W
- Country: United States
- State: Arizona
- County: Maricopa
- Time zone: UTC-7 (Mountain (MST))

Higley was an unincorporated community in Maricopa County, Arizona, United States. Higley's ZIP code was 85236 until 2007, when the U.S. Postal Service decided to abolish it for physical addresses, the 85236 ZIP code, however, remains in use for P.O. Box addresses at the Higley post office, located on Ray Road. As of 2010, almost all of Higley has been annexed into Gilbert or the neighboring cities of Mesa and Queen Creek. All that officially remains of Higley as an independent community is the school district, Higley Unified School District, however, some remaining commercial buildings in and around the original townsite are still standing and operate as small businesses.

== Geography ==
Higley was located at 33°18′26″N 111°43′13″W (33.30729, -111.720314), in the vicinity of Higley Rd. and Williams Field Rd. The original townsite was on the southwest corner.

== History ==
Higley was named after one of the community's first landowners, Stephen Weaver Higley, and originated as a plot of 40 acres (160,000 m^{2}) purchased in 1905–1906 and platted in 1928.
