= Jacob Berry =

American baseball player (born 2001)

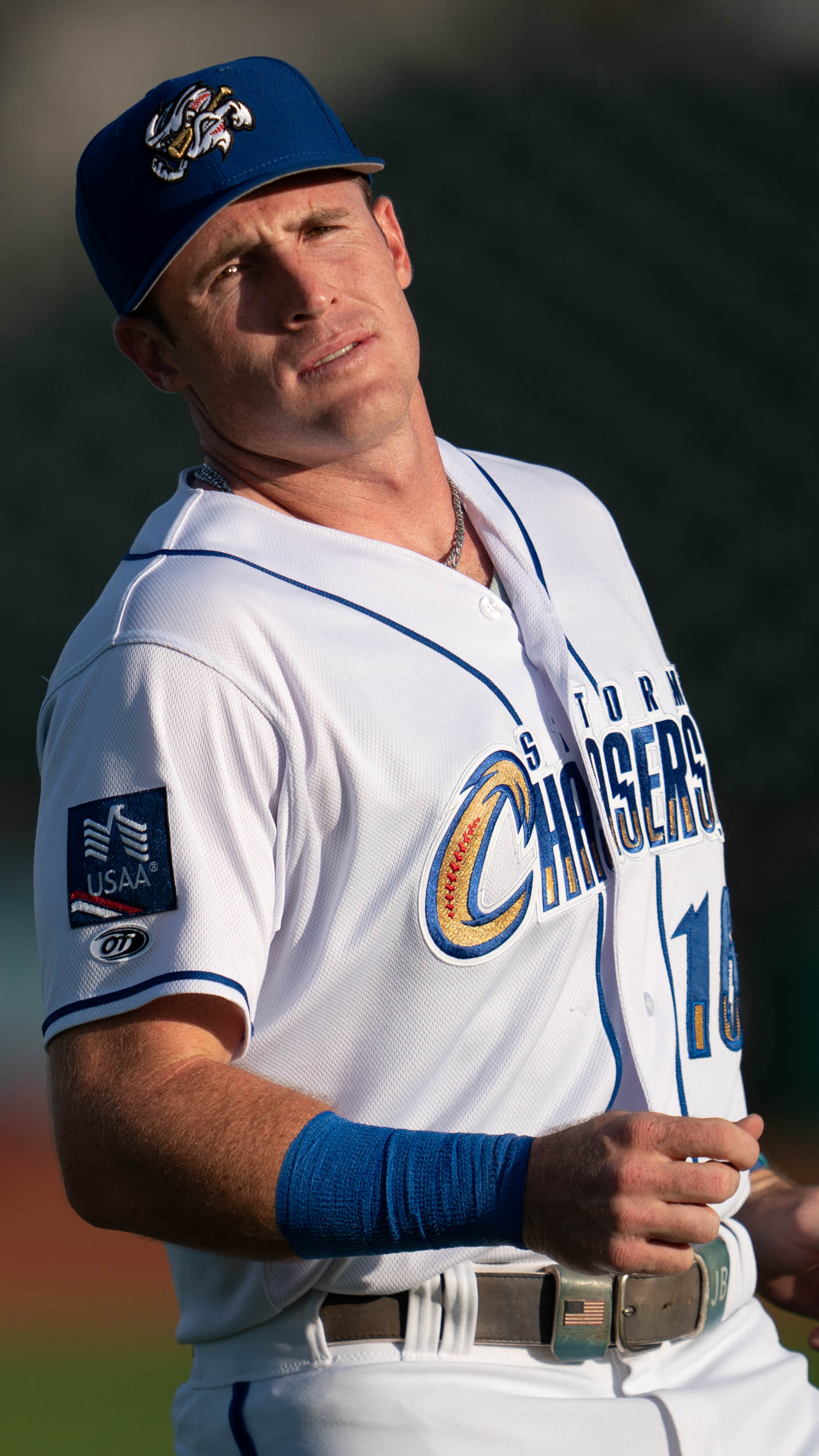
- Berry with the Omaha Storm Chasers in 2026

Kansas City Royals
- Third baseman / Right fielder
- Born: May 5, 2001 (age 25); Cortez, Arizona, U.S.
- Bats: Switch Throws: Right

Jacob Berry (born May 5, 2001) is an American professional baseball third baseman and right fielder in the Kansas City Royals organization. He played college baseball for Louisiana State University and the University of Arizona and was selected by the Miami Marlins in the first round of the 2022 Major League Baseball draft.

== Amateur career ==
Berry attended Queen Creek High School in Queen Creek, Arizona. After graduating in 2020, he enrolled at the University of Arizona to play college baseball for the Arizona Wildcats. In 2021, his freshman year, he appeared in 63 games (making 62 starts), slashing .352/.439/.676 with 17 home runs, 70 runs batted in (RBI), 19 doubles, and 54 runs scored, earning multiple All-American honors. He spent a majority of the season as a designated hitter but also played nine games at third base. He was also named to the Pac-12 All Conference Team. He played with the USA Baseball Collegiate National Team that summer.

Following the end of the 2021 season, Arizona head coach Jay Johnson announced he would be leaving the team to become the head coach for the LSU Tigers. After the announcement, Berry entered the transfer portal before announcing shortly after that he would be transferring to LSU. Berry entered the 2022 season as a top prospect for the upcoming draft. He began starting in right field (alongside spending some time at third base) for the Tigers. He missed a brief period during the season after breaking his finger. Over 53 games, he batted .370 with 15 home runs and 48 RBI and was named an All-American. Following the season's end, he traveled to San Diego where he participated in the Draft Combine.

== Professional career ==
=== Miami Marlins ===
The Miami Marlins selected Berry in the first round with the sixth overall selection of the 2022 Major League Baseball draft. He signed with the team for $6 million. He made his professional debut in late July with the Rookie-level Florida Complex League Marlins. After four games, he was promoted to the Jupiter Hammerheads of the Single-A Florida State League. Over 37 games between the two teams, he batted .248 with three home runs and 26 RBI.

Berry was assigned to the Beloit Sky Carp of the High-A Midwest League to open the 2023 season. In late July, he was promoted to the Pensacola Blue Wahoos of the Double-A Southern League. Over 107 games between the two teams, he hit .233 with nine home runs and 59 RBI. He was selected to play in the Arizona Fall League with the Peoria Javelinas after the season. Berry was assigned to Pensacola to open the 2024 season and was promoted to the Jacksonville Jumbo Shrimp of the Triple-A International League in late August. Over 129 games between Pensacola and Jacksonville, Berry batted .239 with 11 home runs, 54 RBI, and 14 stolen bases.

Berry was assigned to Jacksonville for the 2025 season. He ended his 2025 season with a walk-off two-run home run in the ninth inning to help the Jumbo Shrimp win the Triple-A National Championship Game. He was named the Most Valuable Player of the game. Over 123 games for the season, Berry batted .246 with eight home runs, 54 RBI, and 27 stolen bases.

Berry returned to Jacksonville to open the 2026 season. In 72 appearances for the Jumbo Shrimp, he slashed .251/.372/.362 with four home runs, 34 RBI, and 18 stolen bases.

=== Kansas City Royals ===
On August 5, 2026, Berry was traded to the Kansas City Royals for cash considerations. He was assigned to the Triple-A Omaha Storm Chasers. Across 29 games with Omaha, Berry batted .250 with eight home runs and 17 RBI.

== Personal life ==
Berry's father, Perry, was drafted by the Houston Astros in 1990 and played in the minor leagues for four years. He has two sisters, Jade and Jenae, and one brother, Jet. Both of his sisters play college softball, Jade at Stanford and Jenae at Arizona.
