= Thomas J. Quigley =

American priest

Thomas J. Quigley (1905 – 1960) was an American priest and educator. He was the Superintendent of Schools in the Roman Catholic Diocese of Pittsburgh, Pennsylvania from 1939 - 1955 and the namesake of Quigley Catholic High School.

Quigley was recognized as a leader among local clergy and educators, including John B. McDowell, then Superintendent of Diocesan Schools, who described him at the dedication of Quigley Catholic in April 1968 as an "extraordinary priest [who] served the diocese, its schools, and the general community as a spiritual leader and an accomplished educator".

He was involved in the Catholic literary revival as a member of the Gallery of Living Catholic Authors.
