= Williams Field High School =

- 2076 South Higley Road; Gilbert, Arizona

Information
- Type: Public
- Established: 2007
- Sister school: Higley High School
- School district: Higley Unified School District
- Principal: John Dolan
- Teaching staff: 99.65 (FTE)
- Grades: 9-12
- Enrollment: 2,195 (2023-2024)
- Student to teacher ratio: 22.03
- Color
- Mascot: Black Hawk
- Rival: Campo Verde High School, Queen Creek High School, Higley High School
- National ranking: 1. 1944
- Website: williamsfield.husd.org
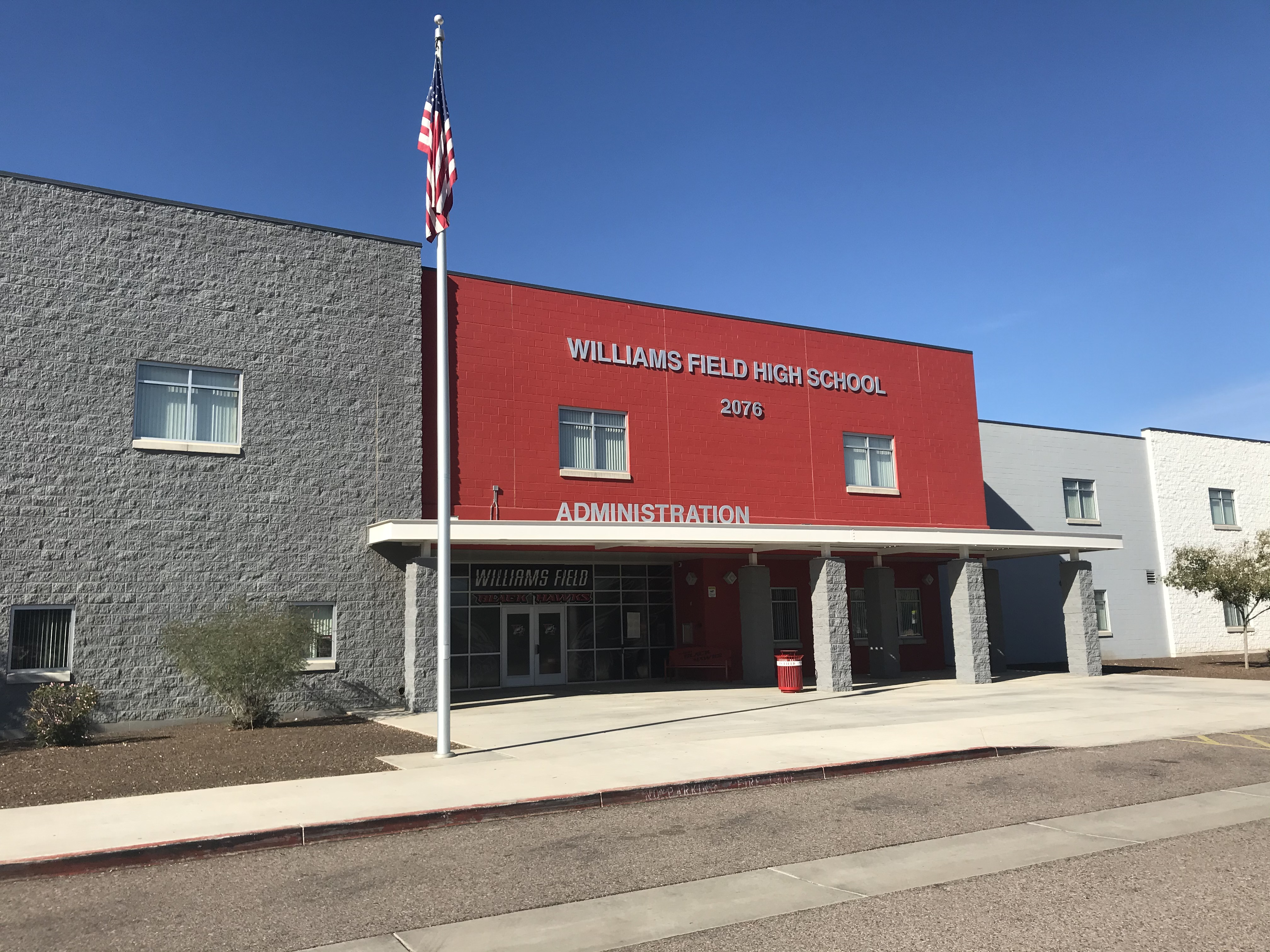
- Williams Field high school administrative building.

Williams Field High School (WFHS) is a high school in Gilbert, Arizona. It is the second high school formed by the Higley Unified School District, and opened in August 2007. Its first students graduated in 2010. The school is named after Williams Air Force Base (which went by the name Williams Field between 1942 and 1948; a local major road also bears the name Williams Field). The school is located near Higley Traditional Academy and the Lyons Gate community.

== History ==
The Higley Unified School District, in the ten years preceding the opening of Williams Field, had undergone a dramatic transformation. What once was a one-school elementary district that sent its high schoolers to Gilbert had morphed into a school district with its own high school and multiple elementary schools. The growth did not stop, and on March 8, 2006, the district broke ground on a 56-acre lot for a new high school. The district eventually opened the 227,800-square-foot (21,160 m^{2}) campus to its first students as the 2007 school year started. The school is built on the same site plan and with the same exterior as Peoria's Liberty High School, which opened the year before.

The original mascot was to be the Pirates, but preference for the Black Hawks trumped the initial decision.

== Marching band and color guard ==
=== Marching band ===
November 2010 The Williams Field Black Hawk Regiment marching band took 1st place in the ABODA State Marching Band Division III Championships. They were also awarded music and visual performance captions.

In 2012, The Williams Field Black Hawk Regiment took 3rd place in the 2012 ABODA State Marching Band Championships. They also received First place in every percussion and color guard/auxiliary caption over the course of the season.

November 16, 2013, The Williams Field Black Hawk Regiment took 1st place in the ABODA State Marching Band Division III Championships, and were awarded the General Effect, Percussion, Auxiliary, and Visual Performance Captions.

Fall 2014 Williams Field Black Hawk Regiment entered ABODA Division II.

November 12, 2016, The Williams Field Black Hawk Regiment took 1st place in the ABODA State Marching Band Division II Championships. They were also awarded Percussion, Auxiliary, General Effect, and Music Captions.

Fall 2017, The Williams Field Black Hawk Regiment entered ABODA Division I.

=== Winter Guard ===
The Williams Field Winter Guard, a color guard in their first winter season after the opening of the school in 2007, won first place in the Scholastic Regional A division in 2008, at the Winter Guard Arizona (WGAZ) Championships, held in Phoenix, Arizona.

In 2012, the Winter Guard took first place again in Scholastic Regional A at the 2012 WGAZ Championships.

In 2014, the Winter Guard took first place in Scholastic AA Local at the 2014 WGAZ Championships scoring 76.22.

In 2015, the Winter Guard took third place in Scholastic A National at the 2015 WGAZ Championships

=== Winter drumline ===
In 2011, the Williams Field Drumline (known at the time as the Williams Field Percussion Project), took home first place in an independent division

In 2012, the Williams Field Drumline took 3rd place in the 2012 WGAZ State Championship.

In 2013, the Williams Field Drumline took 5th place in the 2013 WGAZ State Championship.

In 2014, the Williams Field Drumline took 2nd place in the 2014 WGAZ State Championship scoring 89.60.

In 2015, the Williams Field Drumline took 3rd place in the 2015 WGAZ State Championship.

== Football ==
In 2010, the varsity football team finished runner-up in the 4A Division II state championship, losing in a major upset to 13th-seed Thunderbird High School.

In 2014, Williams Field finished runner-up once again, yet this time losing in the Division III state championship to 1st-seed Saguaro High School.

In 2016, Williams Field had an undefeated season, going 14-0—claiming the 5A state championship trophy, winning 14–6 against 5th-seed Centennial (Peoria).

In 2019, Williams Field finished the season 12-2 claiming the 5A state championship trophy yet once again. This time defeating city rival Campo Verde 19–0 with the game being played at Sun Devil Stadium.

== Clubs ==
- Thespians Troupe #7430
- Black Hawk Buzz (TV Broadcasting)
- Gaming Club
- Smash Hawks (Competitive Super Smash Bros. Team, separated from Gaming Club)
- Ping Pong Club
- Student Council
- Sports Medicine club
- Christian Athletes Fellowship
- Color Guard
- Key Club
- Pi (Math Club)
- Programming Club
- Chinese Club (Mandarin language)
- Book Club
- Fashion Club
- BioTech Club
- Go Green Club
- Bowling Club
- Best Buddies
- Robotics Club
- National Honor Society
- National English Honor Society

== Notable alumni ==
Kyler Kasper- Wide receiver at University of Oregon

Blake Blossom- Adult Film Actress

== Citations ==
33°18′46″N 111°43′20″W
