= Queen Creek High School =

High school in Maricopa County, Arizona

Coordinates: 33.247261°N 111.605515°W

Location
- 22149 E. Ocotillo Rd. Queen Creek, Arizona 85142

Information
- Type: Public high school
- Motto: "High Achievement in a Safe and Caring Environment"
- Established: 1986
- School district: Queen Creek Unified School District
- Principal: Scott Lovely
- Staff: 138
- Grades: 9–12
- Enrollment: 2,132 (2023–2024)
- Student to teacher ratio: 21.98
- Colors: Purple and gold
- Mascot: Bulldogs
- Website: qchs.qcusd.org

Queen Creek High School is a public secondary school located in Queen Creek, Arizona.

== History ==
The Queen Creek school district did not open a high school until 1986, when it became a unified school district; previously, the school district bused high school students to other schools far from town. In 1988, the school graduated its first class of 22 seniors, attending classes in a 12-room school building. By the fall of 1988, Queen Creek High had 387 students. Two years later, its principal retired in an uproar over the alteration of the low grades of 50 students. The fast-growing school, housed in a former elementary school with additional portable classroom buildings, was approved in 1999 to move to a new site at Signal Butte and Ocotillo Road. The new school opened in 2002 and allowed Queen Creek's middle school to absorb the former high school site.

In November 2012, their football team won the Division III state championship with an undefeated 14–0 season.

The Queen Creek Unified School District opened a second high school, Eastmark High School, in 2019, with the northern portion of the district being zoned into the new school.

== Notable alumni ==
- Jacob Berry, baseball player
- Kody Funderburk, baseball player
- Tait Reynolds, college football player
