= Al Wesbecher =

American football player and coach (1892–1966)

Profile
- Positions: Center, tackle

Personal information
- Born: November 3, 1892; Greensburg, Pennsylvania, U.S.
- Died: March 27, 1966 (aged 73); Greensburg, Pennsylvania, U.S.
- Listed height: 5 ft 10 in (1.78 m)
- Listed weight: 190 lb (86 kg)

Career information
- High school: Greensburg
- College: Washington and Jefferson

Career history

Playing
- Massillon Tigers (1916–1917); Cleveland Tigers (1920)

Coaching
- Alfred (1920–1922) Head coach

Operations
- Greensburg HS (PA) (?–1955) Athletic director
- Stats at Pro Football Reference

Aloysius Augustus "Buzz" Wesbecher (November 3, 1892 – March 27, 1966) was an American football player and coach. He played professionally for the Cleveland Tigers of the American Professional Football Association, later renamed the National Football League (NFL). Prior to that, he played for the Massillon Tigers in the "Ohio League", which was direct predecessor to the NFL. Wesbecher played at the college football for the Washington & Jefferson Presidents.

Wesbecher was born on November 3, 1892. In 1920, he was hired as the athletic director at Alfred University in Alfred, New York. There Wesbecher served as the head coach of the Alfred Saxons football team from 1920 to 1922, compiling a record of 11–10–4. He was also the head basketball coach at Alfred for three seasons, from 1920 to 1923, tallying a mark of 5–25. Wesbecher coached football at Greensburg High School in Greensburg, Pennsylvania, from which he graduated in 1912, and Youngwood High School in Westmoreland County, Pennsylvania. He was also the athletic director at Greensburg High School before his resignation in 1955. Wesbecher died on March 27, 1966, at Westmoreland Hospital in Greensburg.

== Head coaching record ==
=== College football ===
Year	Team	Overall	Conference	Standing	Bowl/playoffs
Alfred Saxons (Independent) (1920–1922)
1920	Alfred	4–3			
1921	Alfred	3–3–2			
1922	Alfred	4–4–2			
Alfred:		11–10–4			
Total:		11–10–4			
