= Higley Unified School District =

School district in Gilbert, Arizona

Higley Unified School District #60

Address
- 2935 S. Recker Rd. Gilbert, Arizona, 85295; United States
- Coordinates: 33.297223°N 111.703025°W

District information
- Type: Public
- Motto: Preparing learners for limitless opportunities.
- Grades: PK-12
- Established: 1909; 117 years ago
- Deputy superintendent(s): Sherry Richards
- Schools: 16
- Budget: about $50 million
- NCES District ID: 0403780

Students and staff
- Students: 13,500

Other information
- Website: www.husd.org

The Higley Unified School District #60 or HUSD #60, is a school district in Gilbert, Arizona. The school district serves 12,600 students across 15 schools in portions of Gilbert, Mesa and Queen Creek. It was originally established to serve the community of Higley, but Gilbert annexed most of the Higley community. It is one of Arizona's fastest growing school districts. Continued modest growth is expected despite the downturn in the economy during the 2000s. In August 2013, the district opened two new middle schools and all other elementary schools that hosted grades K-8 went down to K-6.

== About HUSD ==
Higley Unified School District is a district in the state of Arizona. It operates 2 preschools, 9 elementary schools, 2 middle schools, 2 high schools and one virtual academy.

Higley is an open-enrolment district, which permits parents to choose a school, regardless of the individual school boundaries. The district also allows un-housed children to register for school.

The District has two administrative sites. The primary administration building is located north of Higley High School and the district's transportation center is located south of Williams Field High School.

All high schools and middle schools utilize a resource officer to help protect the school environment from disruptions and crimes.

=== Curriculum ===
All preschool classes are split into 2 classes per day, depending on the school and the time the classes start. Higley offers full day kindergarten classes at its schools. Higley's comprehensive curriculum is aligned with the Arizona Academic Standards and the new Common Core Standards. The District primarily focuses on the core standards, which are Reading, Writing, Math, Science, and Social Studies. Higley also offers free full day kindergarten classes, technological instructions, library media services, K-8 Art, Music, and Physical Education, Character Education, and Before and After School Enrichment Programs. In Middle School, Higley offers choir, band, strings, applied technology, Spanish, and many skills for success. Along with its academic programs, Higley provides students athletic programs to encourage children to be actively fit while focusing on academics. The Middle Schools also offer early development childhood (preschool) services. Higley Unified School often tries new academic programs and standards not yet passed or effective in the state to allow students to get used to the new curriculum and align it in the future.

== History ==
The Higley district was incorporated in 1909 with a territory far larger than its current size, with most of the district land transferred to other Valley school districts over the years. For instance, the Queen Creek Unified School District was carved out of the Higley district in 1947. Higley Elementary School was the only school in the district for the next 53 years. The district's high school students attended Gilbert Public Schools' high schools. As the Valley expanded, Larry Likes, then-superintendent of the district, guided it through an era of suburban expansion engulfing local farmland. The growth of the 1990s and 2000s caught up to the district's 24-square-mile (62 km^{2}) service area. In 1999, the district legally unified; in 2000, it opened Coronado Elementary School, its first new school in decades; in 2001, Higley High School opened its doors; four years later, Gateway Pointe Elementary School debuted, then a year later, Cortina Elementary School opened; another year later, further growth induced the opening of Williams Field High School. In the spring of 2008, Higley became the first district in Arizona to receive K-12 accreditation by the AdvancED/North Central Accreditation Team. Graduating Higley seniors were offered $2.7 million in academic and athletic scholarships.

In early 2011, Higley had more than 10,000 students in the district.

The district opened two middle schools (Cooley Middle School and Sossaman Middle School) to better prepare 7th and 8th grade students for high school and to alleviate projected capacity issues at its elementary schools.

=== District Website ===
The Higley Unified School District website is https://www.husd.org/.

Users can access the latest news, events, information pertaining to schools, enrolment, career opportunities, and more.

=== Statistics and Demographics (2024-2025) ===
- Student Enrolment: 13,500
- Employees: 1,600
- Graduation Rate: 96%
- Rated A by the Arizona Department of Education

=== Higley Center for the Performing Arts ===
The District built the HCPA and opened in spring of 2006. The HCPA has a large concert hall, seating 1,235 people and a little theatre, able to sit 186 people. Over 500 productions are yearly shown in the building. It is located adjacent to the Higley High School, and schools throughout the district use it to show major assemblies or guest speakers.

=== Transportation ===
Transportation of students from the various schools throughout the district is provided by the District's transportation crew. They currently have 63 School Buses and 53 Support Vehicles. The district mandates that all students taking a field trip must be approved by parents. The district also provides transportation for students to and from school. Any student who lives within one mile from the school they go to, although, does not have transportation, and will have to transport themselves to and from school. To better balance all the school bus use to transport students to and from school, the district changed the school bell times to help align the high schools, middle schools, and elementary schools so as to not cause traffic.

== Schools ==
=== Preschools ===
Preschools	Mascot	Address	Director (2025-2026)	Assistant Director (2025-2026)	Established
Cooley Early Childhood Development Center (Home)	Cougars	1100 S. Recker Rd. Gilbert, AZ, 85296	Amy Kochis	Marsha Hofstetter	2013
Sossaman Early Childhood Development Center (Home)	Spartans	18655 E. Jacaranda Blvd. Queen Creek, AZ, 85142	Amy Kochis	Marsha Hofstetter	2013

=== Elementary schools (grades K-6) ===
Elementary Schools	Mascot	Address	Principal (2025-2026)	Assistant Principal (2025-2026)	Established
Bridges Elementary (Home)	Bobcats	5205 S. Soboba St., Gilbert, AZ	Jeff Beickel	Elizabeth Melter	2016
Centennial Elementary (Home)	Cardinals	3507 S. Ranch House Pkwy, Gilbert, AZ 85297	Amanda Day	Eric Rogers	2009
Chaparral Elementary (Home)	Sharks	338 E. Frye Rd. Gilbert, AZ 85295	Kristine Hanson	Terry Peper	2007
Coronado Elementary (Home)	Coyotes	4333 S. De Anza Blvd. Gilbert, AZ 85297	Brian Griggs	Alice Sortini	2000
Cortina Elementary (Home)	Tigers	19680 S. 188th St. Queen Creek, AZ 85242	Kelly Papke	Chrissy DeBono	2006
Gateway Pointe Elementary (Home)	Gators	2069 S. De La Torre Dr. Gilbert, AZ 85295	Kaity Harris	Angie Walker	2005
Higley Traditional Academy (Home)	Hawks	3391 E. Vest Ave. Gilbert, AZ 85295	Caryn Bacon	Mandy Bachali	1909
Power Ranch (Home)	Panthers	351 S. Ranch House Pkwy. Gilbert, AZ 85297	Michelle McNabb	Nicole McCullough	2003
San Tan (Home)	Scorpions	3443 E. Calistoga Dr. Gilbert, AZ 85297	Ray Mercado	Lyndsey Reeves	2001

=== Middle schools (grades 7-8) ===
Middle Schools	Mascot	Address	Principal (2025-2026)	Assistant Principal (2025-2026)	Established
Cooley Middle School (Home)	Cougars	1100 S. Recker Rd. Gilbert, AZ, 85296	Chad Cantrell	Shana Lacerenza	2013
Sossaman Middle School (Home)	Spartans	18655 E. Jacaranda Blvd. Queen Creek, AZ, 85142	Bruce Potts	Brandon Keeling	2013

=== High schools (grades 9-12) ===
High Schools	Mascot	Address	Principal (2025-2026)	Assistant Principals (2025-2026)	Established
Higley High School (Home)	Knights	4068 E. Pecos Rd. Gilbert, AZ 85295	Brian Banach	Aaron Dille, Monique Brandau, Pamela Simmons, Sean Casey	2001
Williams Field High School (Home)	Black Hawks	2076 S. Higley Rd. Gilbert, AZ 85295	John Dolan	Darrell Stangle, Heather Wallace, Michael O'Neal, Brent Brandenburg	2007

== Awards ==
- Rated A by the Arizona Department of Education (2023)
- Certificate of Excellence in Financial Reporting by the Association of School Business Officials International (2023)
- Certificate of Achievement for Excellence in Financial Reporting by the Government Finance Officers of the United States (2023)

== See also ==
- Chandler Unified School District
- Queen Creek Unified School District
- Gilbert Public Schools
