= Higley High School =

School in Gilbert, Arizona

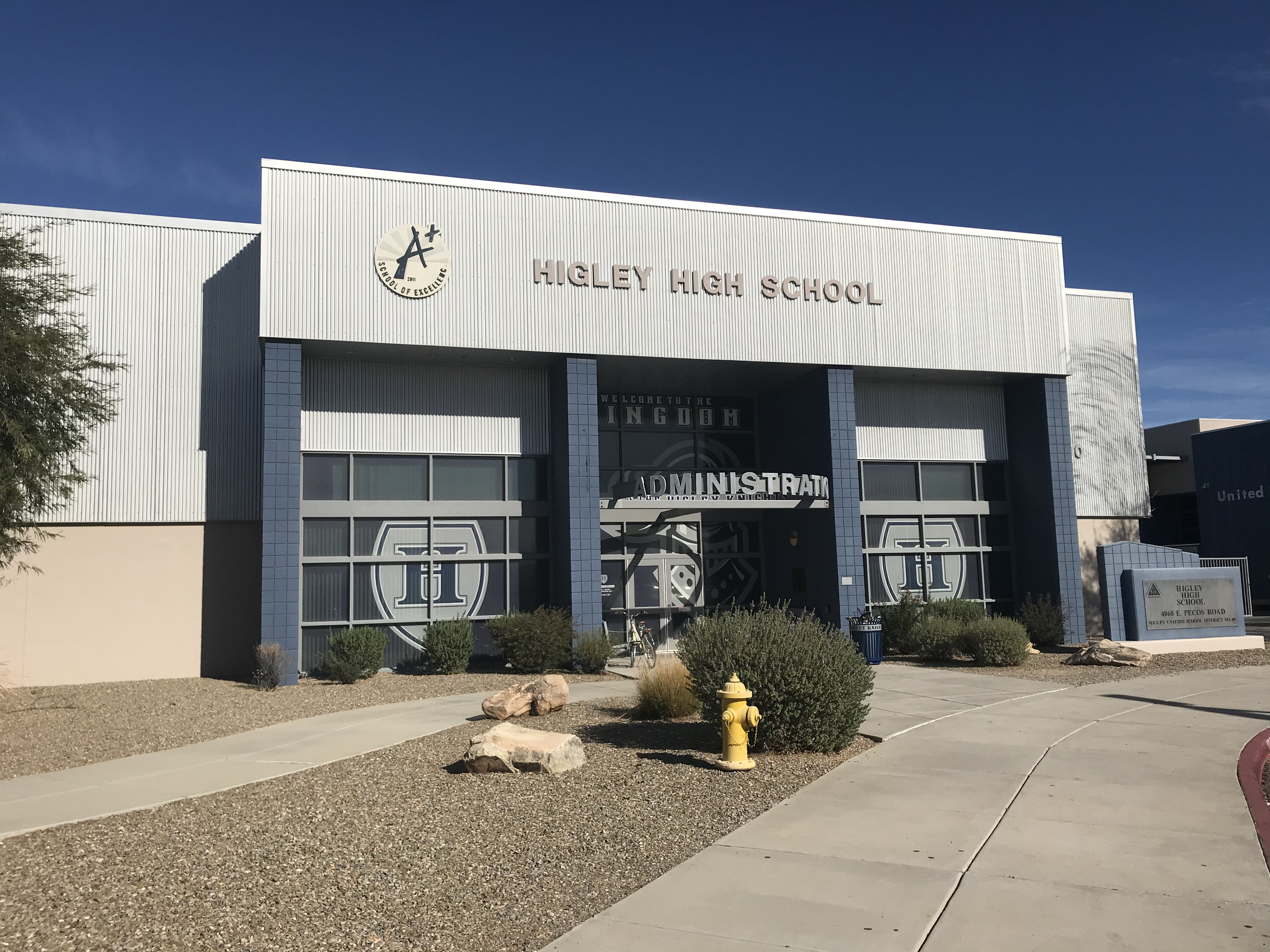
- Higley high school administrative building.

Location
- 4068 East Pecos Road; Gilbert, Arizona 85295; United States; 33°17′37″N 111°42′7″W

Information
- School type: Public high school
- Motto: "United in excellence and honor"
- Established: 2001
- School district: Higley Unified School District
- Principal: Brian Banach
- Teaching staff: 104.45 (FTE)
- Grades: 9–12
- Enrollment: 2,163 (2023–2024)
- Student to teacher ratio: 20.71
- Colors: Navy blue, silver, white
- Mascot: Knights
- Website: higleyhigh.husd.org

Higley High School is a high school in Gilbert, Arizona, United States. It is one of two high schools run by the Higley Unified School District.

On December 9, 2022, Higley's varsity football team defeated Cactus 41-21 to capture the 5A state championship, their first in school history.

On May 11, 2018, Higley's varsity boys volleyball team defeated American Leadership Academy – Queen Creek 3–2 to capture the 5A state title.

== Notable alumni ==
- Quinn Bailey, Denver Broncos offensive tackle
- Keaton Jones, 2024 Summer Olympics swimmer in men's 200m backstroke
- Coleman Owen, Indianapolis Colts wide receiver
- MyKayla Skinner, former artistic gymnast, 2020 Olympic vault silver medalist; alternate for the 2016 Olympic team
