= Gallery of Living Catholic Authors =

Catholic literary society

- Formation: 1932; 94 years ago
- Founder: Sister Mary Joseph Scherer
- Headquarters: Webster Groves, Missouri, United States
- Members: 775 (1954)

The Gallery of Living Catholic Authors was a Catholic literary society founded in 1932 by American nun and archivist Sister Mary Joseph Scherer (1883–1967). As part of the Catholic literary revival movement, it sought to promote interest in contemporaneous Catholic literature.

At the time of its founding, Sister Mary Joseph was an educator at Webster College in Webster Groves, Missouri, United States, near St. Louis.

Initially a modest effort to promote Catholic literature on Webster's campus, Sister Mary Joseph would soon expand the society by inviting hundreds of prominent Catholic writers, poets, and clergy from around the world. In 1936, the Gallery's board sought to select 40 Gallery members to form an academy of the greatest living Catholic authors, a nod to the membership of les immortels of the Académie Française. By that year, membership had grown to 200, rising to 775 by 1954. Sister Mary Joseph commissioned architect Ralph Adams Cram to design a library to store its extensive archives, although this was never built.

In 1945, Sister Mary Joseph billed the Gallery as "the Catholic literary center of the world".

Despite Mary Joseph's ambitions, by the early 1960s, the Gallery was in decline. After Sister Mary Joseph's resignation in 1960 and death in 1967, the Gallery quickly faded into relative obscurity. As of 2025, its collections are maintained by the Georgetown University Library.

== List of members ==
- Hilaire Belloc
- G.K. Chesterton
- Claude McKay
- Christopher Dawson
- Clare Boothe Luce
- Thomas Merton
- François Mauriac
- Maria von Trapp
- Fulton Sheen
- Bruce Marshall
- Jacques Maritain
- Ronald Knox
- Graham Greene
- Thomas J. Quigley
