= Roman Catholic High School =

Catholic school in Philadelphia, Pennsylvania, United States

The Roman Catholic High School of Philadelphia
- Roman Catholic High School's logo

Location
- 301 North Broad Street; Philadelphia, Pennsylvania 19107; United States; 39°57′30″N 75°9′43″W

Information
- Type: Private, catholic, college preparatory
- Motto: Latin: Fides et Scientia (Faith and Knowledge)
- Religious affiliation: Catholic Church
- Established: 1890
- Founder: Thomas E. Cahill
- Oversight: Roman Catholic Archdiocese of Philadelphia
- NCES School ID: 01187493
- President: John A. Prendergast
- Faculty: 40.0 (on an FTE basis)
- Grades: 9–12
- Gender: All-male
- Enrollment: 813 (2019–2020)
- Student to teacher ratio: 20.3
- Campus type: Urban
- Colors: Purple & Gold
- Song: The Purple and Gold
- Athletics conference: Philadelphia Catholic League
- Nickname: The Cahillites
- Accreditation: MSA
- Publication: Roamings (literary magazine)
- Newspaper: The Roman Empire
- Yearbook: Purple and Gold
- Tuition: $10,425
- Website: www.romancatholichs.com

The Roman Catholic High School of Philadelphia is a four-year private, Catholic high school for boys in Philadelphia. Thomas E. Cahill founded it in 1890 as the nation's first free Catholic high school. The school is located at the intersection of Broad and Vine streets in Center City Philadelphia, and is managed by the Archdiocese of Philadelphia.

== History ==
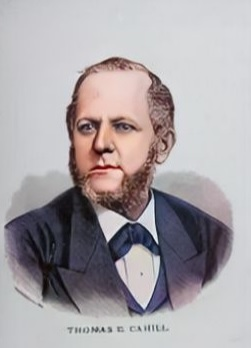
Thomas E. Cahill, an 18th century Philadelphia merchant, whose philanthropy established the school

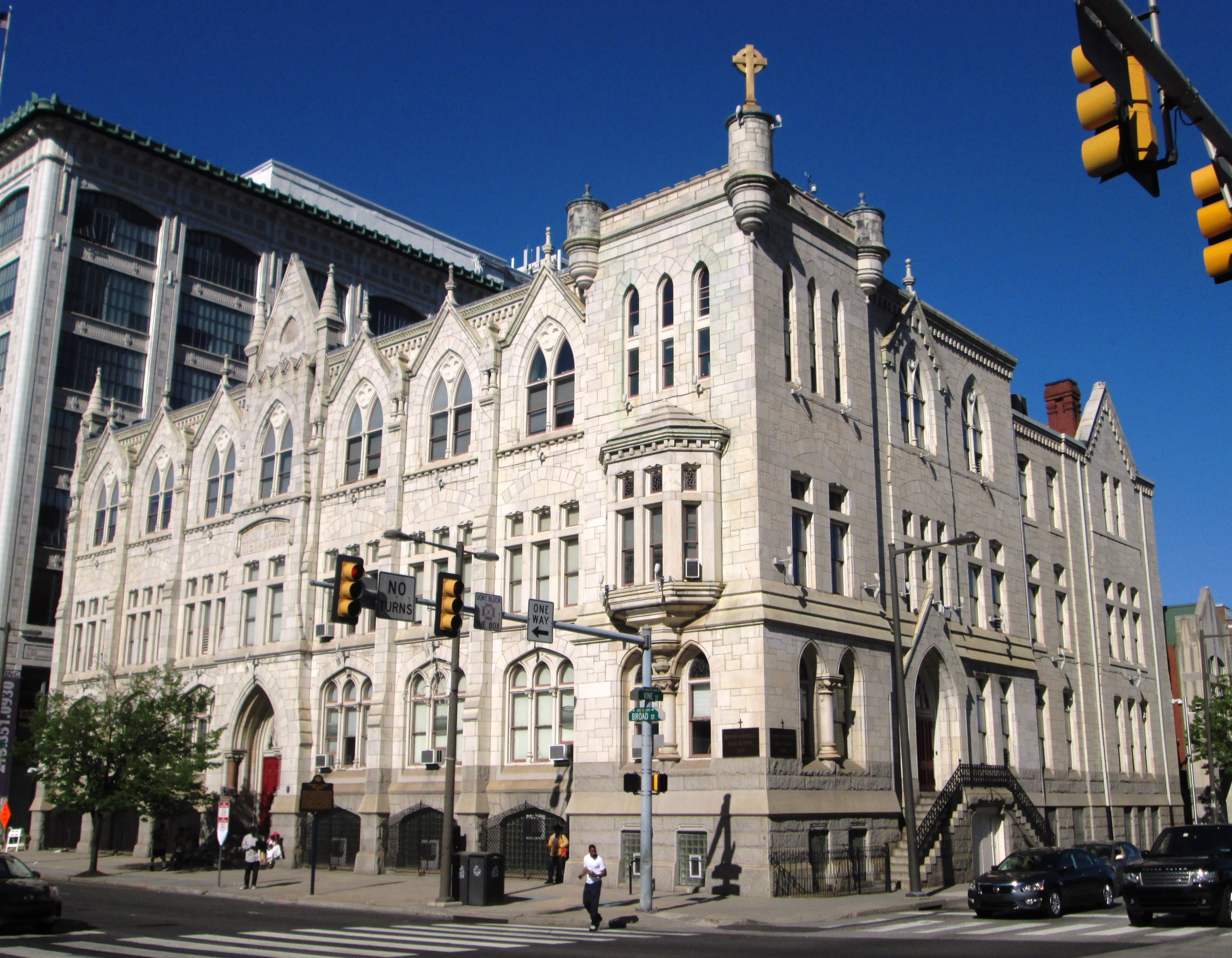
The school in 2013

Roman Catholic High School was founded with funding provided by the estate of Thomas E. Cahill, a 19th-century Philadelphia merchant. Cahill had envisioned the need to create a school that offered a free Catholic education for boys past their grammar school years. Cahill died before seeing that vision come to life. However, those wishes were followed and guided by a written will and his wife, Sophia Cahill. Roman Catholic opened its doors in 1890 and offered free education to boys. Due to increased staff and facilities costs, free admission to the school ended in the 1960s.

=== Founder ===
Thomas E. Cahill, born May 27, 1828, was the son of Thomas Cahill, a native of County Louth in Ireland, colloquially known as 'the Wee County', who came to America in 1817, and of Maria Elliott, daughter of one of the oldest colonial families of Delaware. His father was a railroad contractor who suffered heavy reverses in his business. His mother died at the age of 36. Thomas left school to do his share in supporting a large family. At 17, he opened a small store in Philadelphia, located between Pine and Spruce Streets on 26th at a wharf on the Schuylkill River.

Successful from the start, he embarked in the wood, coal, and ice business with the proceeds of his first venture. He later organized the Cold Spring Ice and Coal Company. In 1854, he became the first president. In 1869, he effected a consolidation of the large ice firms of the city, incorporating under the name of the famous brand Knickerbocker Ice Company.

=== 19th century ===
Roman Catholic High School was dedicated on September 6, 1890, in a ceremony conducted by Archbishop Ryan of Philadelphia. His dedication speech compared education in public schools, lacking the Christian recognition of the soul and the importance of teaching that subject at this new catholic high school in the education of young men. A class numbering 105 boys was selected for entrance into the new high school. Later, only 26 students survived economic hardships and became members of the first graduating class in 1894. Compared with the number who began as first-year students, the percentage of graduates was slightly less than 25%. In 1928, one-half of those who started received diplomas. Over the 95 years since its opening, 16,228 students have graduated from Roman Catholic High.

=== 20th century ===
In 1985, the Archdiocese slated the school for closing due to lower enrollment. However, the school's alumni association, with the blessing of Philadelphia's John Cardinal Krol, embarked on a campaign to save the school. Roman's Alumni Association, which had existed for over 70 years, came together to raise funds and increase enrollment. The rector of the school even applied to have the building itself designated a historic landmark, which was approved. The historic landmark designation means the building at the corner of Broad and Vine Streets can never legally be torn down. Also, its exterior must always stay the same, though it does not have to remain a school.

Before 1986, students who attended Roman were from "feeder parishes"; Roman served as the school for the boys from the Center City, Chinatown, East Falls, Fairmount, Manayunk, North Philadelphia, and Roxborough regions of Philadelphia.

Roman enrolls boys from almost every Philadelphia neighborhood, including The Near and Far Northeast, West Philadelphia, Fishtown, Port Richmond, Mayfair, South Philly, Fox Chase, Roxborough, South Jersey, and outlying suburbs.

Roman Catholic High School was built to hold about 750-800 students. Due to high demand, the school is over capacity, with approximately 1,100 students. The school holds an entrance test to select its students every October, November, and December. Of the 600 or 700 students who apply, roughly 300 to 350 are accepted. Students who do well on these tests may also receive scholarships ranging from a few hundred dollars to as much as $4000 a year. Usually, about 40 students receive scholarships.

Like other high schools, Roman has a tracking system: that is, the first track (also called the honors track), the second track, and the third track. Roman, however, is unique in that it tracks its honors class into three classes. While students in the honors classes learn the same material at the same pace, having students of the same level together creates a better learning environment.

=== 21st century ===
Beginning with the 2012–2013 school year, Roman announced the implementation of a 1:1 iPad initiative for incoming first-year students. Given the ever-changing landscape of education, students require different tools and strategies. The initiative allows students and teachers to individualize and familiarize instruction. Students work on essential 21st-century skill sets needed to meet state and national standards.

==== Sexual abuse scandal ====
In July 2011, Philadelphia magazine published an article by Robert Huber regarding the 2011 grand jury report, which documented new charges of child sexual abuse by priests active in the Archdiocese of Philadelphia. The article included the story of Joe, a 59-year-old who spoke of his abuse at the hands of Father McGuigan, in 1966, when a ninth grader at Roman Catholic High School.

== Historical marker ==
The historical marker for Roman Catholic High School erected at Broad and Vine Streets in Philadelphia

Dedicated: Tuesday, September 29, 2009. Location: E side of N Broad St., between Vine & Pearl, Philadelphia, by the Historical Commission as referenced on the List of Pennsylvania state historical markers. Marker Text: Thomas E. Cahill "Entrepreneur and philanthropist who bequeathed the bulk of his estate to establish Roman Catholic High School for Boys, the first free Catholic high school in the US. Founded here in 1890, the school initiated a diocesan high school system that became a model throughout the nation. Coming from a poor immigrant family, Cahill sought to provide young men from similar backgrounds with the secondary education denied him."

== Campus ==
The campus consists of four structures, two on Vine Street and two on Wood Street.

=== Main building (Broad and Vine Streets) ===
Located on the northeast corner intersection of Broad and Vine Streets.

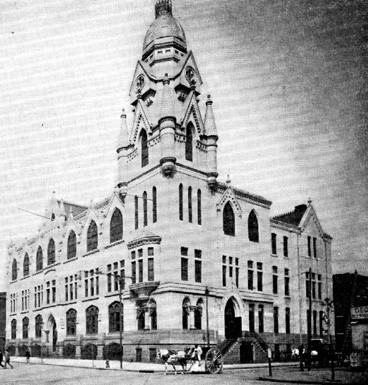
Roman Catholic High School for Boys in 1908

Dedicated on September 6, 1890, the school's original main building established the main entrance on the frontage of North Broad Street. The building's length was 140 feet, extending eastward on Vine Street for 115 feet, bordered on the north by the very narrow Pearl Street and bounded eastward by a ten-foot-wide alley commonly known as Watts Street, which was rededicated to the school. The land was formerly a Railroad Depot, moved just north to Cahowhill Street. The exterior is a three-story building of Victorian Gothic design, faced with "Lee, Massachusetts" marble (the same as selected for Philadelphia City Hall), placed on a granite base (quarried from Conshohocken, Pennsylvania) and sited to impact majestically at the intersection by prominent architect Edwin Forrest Durang. The building has two ornamental stone façades along Vine and Broad Streets, joined at a square-corner tower, and two brick façades at the rear. The building originally had a 150-foot marble tower topped with copper at the corner of Broad and Vine, which was destroyed by fire in 1959 and was not replaced.

Initially, there were 20 classrooms, each designed to accommodate between 24 and 42 pupils. The building contained offices, a library suite, mechanical arts workshops, and, on the third floor, a hall with a seating capacity of 700, a gymnasium, and studios with natural lighting for drawing and modeling. External fire towers provided access to lavatory facilities, but no provision was made for a lunchroom. The tower, not entirely ornamental, was fitted with instruments for astronomy classes.

Historically Certified in 1986 by the Historical Commission, it is classified as Gothic Revival architecture and consistent with some important Catholic churches and institutions in the City.

=== Renaissance Hall-Main building addition (Vine Street) ===
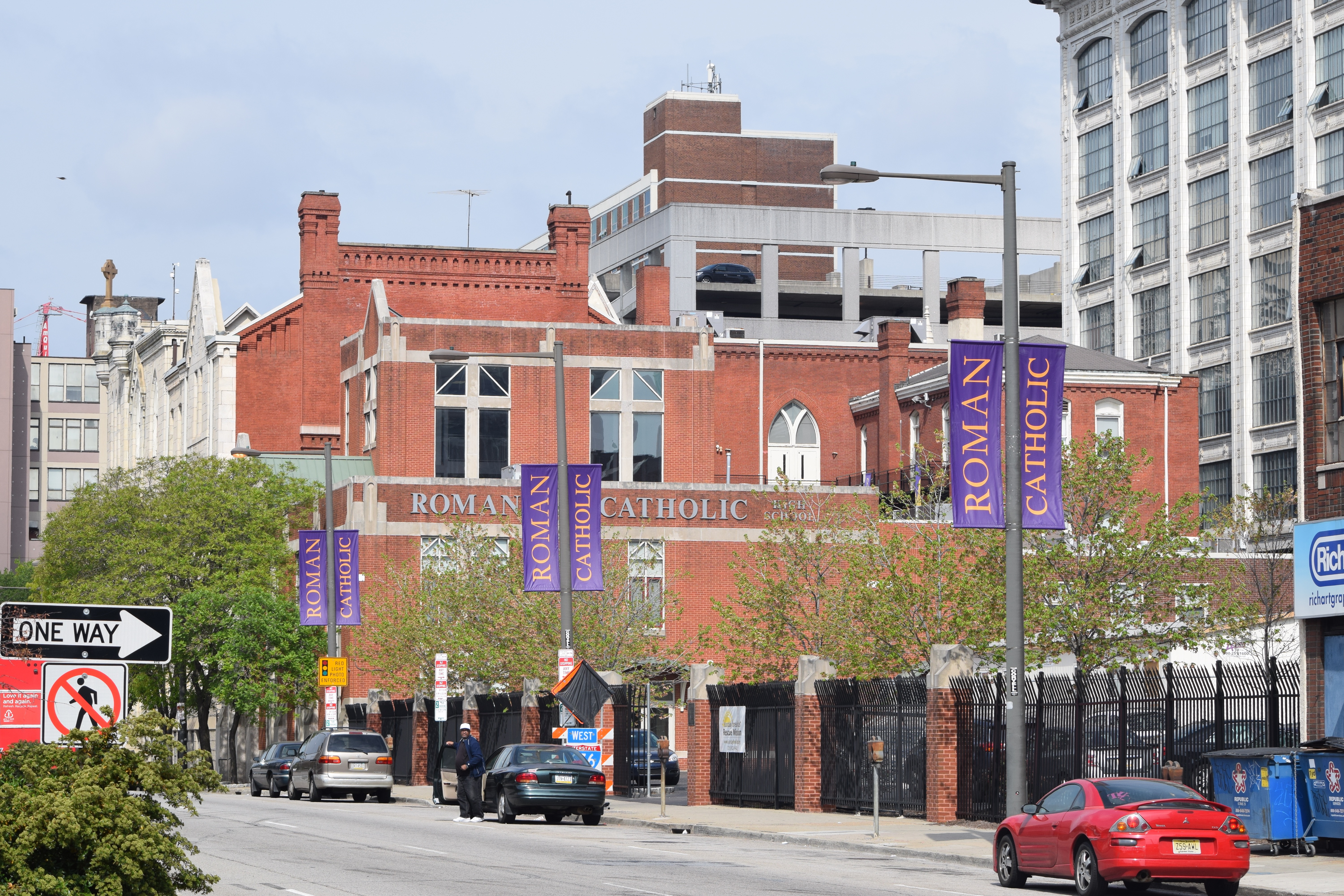
View east side of Roman Catholic High School. Roman's 1953 and 1997 additions are visible in the foreground, showing the contrast between the red brick façades and the marble façade of the original 1890 building.

In 1953, the original three-story building received an additional two-story wing along the east side. It connected and integrated the exterior brick façade into the interior. The space was utilized for physics and biology labs, and the cafeteria. In 1996, the school received permission from the Archdiocese to build a $3.5 million expansion, which was funded by many alumni, friends, and foundations who recognized the historical importance of sustaining a Catholic high school presence in Center City. This wing, dedicated as Renaissance Hall, housed an expanded cafeteria, a new discipline office, one classroom, and an information center that housed the library, computer lab, and television studio (named after broadcaster and alumnus John Facenda). Also during this project, the labs in the 1954 wing were completely gutted and remodeled with new technology, furniture, and equipment. The Library and Information Center was renovated in the summer of 2013, upgrading computers, copiers, printers, and furniture, and was named in honor of John and Mary McShain.

=== Annex Building (Wood Street) ===
In 2006, the school opened an additional building acquired from the City, which had historical significance related to the City's Medical Examiner. The 13th Street Annex was dedicated to James McSherry, an alumnus and benefactor of the school. This new facility housed a sports training center, creative art studio, a multi-purpose room, and the alum association offices.

=== Arts Building-Howard Center for the Arts (Wood Street) ===
As part of "A Vision of Promise" on May 30, 2017, the school held a groundbreaking ceremony for an additional building, with anticipated completion in 2018. The initial stage is the construction of a 40,000-square foot building. The arts center is named for Barry and Elayne Howard, longtime supporters and benefactors of the school. This new expanded academic facility is located about a block away at 1212 Wood Street. It includes band rooms, instrument storage space, a computer-aided design lab, a digital photography studio, a piano lab, a small theater, and an expansion for art programs. More additions to the school are planned in the Vision of Promise.

The School held an unveiling ceremony at the Howard Center on Jan. 26 2023 in the Arts Center’s Black Box Theater and renamed the theater after award-winning playwright Charles Fuller Jr. The theater's new name was suggested by a student and adopted by the Board to be "The Charles H. Fuller Jr., '56 Theater". Fuller is an alumnus of the Roman Catholic Class of 1956 and died in October 2022.

== Extracurricular activities ==
=== Athletics ===
Roman Catholic has been prominent in the Philadelphia Catholic League in basketball since the league's inception, winning 34 championship games since 1920. In 2015, 2016, and 2018, Catholic High won the Philadelphia Catholic League Title (PCL), Philadelphia City Title (District XII), and Pennsylvania Boys Class AAAA (Large School) State Championship.

Roman has also succeeded in football. In the 2006 playoffs, Roman finished with a strong 9–3 record while losing to La Salle in the second round of the Catholic League playoffs. In 2007, Roman defeated Northeast Catholic and Father Judge en route to winning the Catholic League Championship, 10–9 over St. Joseph's Prep. This was Roman's best record ever at 12–2. This marks the team's second Red Division championship since the new Catholic League format began in 1999 and ended in 2007.

Roman Catholic H.S. also has a rivalry with the public high school, Roxborough High. This rivalry has led to an annual Thanksgiving Day football game, a game that Roman Catholic has beaten Roxborough in for decades.

Boys Catholic High School is home to one of the most successful crews in North America, practicing for over ten months a year. Roman's crew team sculls (using two oars per man while rowing) rather than sweeps (using one oar per man while rowing). Recently, it contributed a Lightweight Four to the Philadelphia Catholic League Rowing championships, finishing second in 2005 to Monsignor Bonner High School by six-tenths of a second. Roman's major sculling rivals are The Haverford School, Conestoga High School, and Malvern Preparatory School. In 2003 and 2005, two Roman students represented the United States at the Junior World Championships in Athens, Greece, & Brandenburg, Germany. In 2006, 2010, 2012, and 2016, the team won the Philadelphia Catholic League Championship.

The school's golf team has enjoyed many years of success as one of the league's top teams.

The school's ice hockey team started in 1993. Since then, they have won 4 championships: 2000, 2002, 2010, and 2013.

The school's baseball team has won two Catholic League Championships: in 1978 and 1992. The 1992 team had the best record in school history, finishing the season 15-1 (27-1 overall, losing only the final regular-season game) after beating Bishop Kenrick in the Catholic League Championship game.

=== Mock Trial - School Competition ===
Mock Trial is a competitive club activity at the High School that simulates courtroom proceedings and allows students to assume the roles of attorneys and witnesses. The team argues a case problem provided by the Pennsylvania Bar Association and competes against teams from across the state. Roman Catholic students have a winning championship record and have won the state's Pennsylvania Mock Trial Competition in 2023.

== Notable alumni ==
=== Sports ===
==== 1890–1950 ====
- John "Rube" Cashman, head men's basketball coach for Villanova from 1926 to 1929
- Frank Schell (1899), Gold Medal American rower who competed in the 1904 Summer Olympics
- Charles McIlvaine (honorary diploma awarded 2014), member and gold-medallist of the 1928 U.S. Olympic rowing team
- Matt Guokas Sr. (1934), played for the Philadelphia Warriors 1947 championship team; father of Matt Guokas Jr.
- Tom Conley (1928), football and basketball coach; captain of the 1930 Notre Dame Fighting Irish football team; pall-bearer for Knute Rockne
- Art McNally (1943), former Director of Officiating for the National Football League (NFL) (1968–90), NFL Hall of Fame

==== 1951–1990 ====
- Bob Schafer (1951), Villanova University player, NBA player
- Jim Katcavage (1952), 13-year NFL player with the New York Giants and three-time Pro Bowl participant
- William "Speedy" Morris (1960), famed Roman Catholic High School and La Salle University basketball coach
- Michael Bantom (1969), member of the 1972 Olympic Basketball team, NBA player, and later NBA executive
- Dallas Comegys (1983), DePaul University, an NBA basketball player

==== 1991–present ====
- Marvin Harrison (1991), NFL Hall of Fame Wide Receiver
- Marc Jackson (1993), Temple University and NBA basketball player
- Lari Ketner (1995), University of Massachusetts Amherst and NBA basketball player
- Rasual Butler (1998), Selected by the Miami Heat with the 53rd pick of the 2002 NBA draft
- Eddie Griffin (2000), NCAA All-American at Seton Hall University, drafted by the Houston Rockets in the first round of the 2001 NBA draft
- Scott Paxson (2001), former Penn State all-conference defensive tackle
- Glenn Ochal (2004), US Olympian; 2012 Bronze medalist (4-man crew); 2016 member (8-man crew)
- Brad Wanamaker (2007), NBA and Euroleague player
- Maalik Wayns (2009), NBA basketball player
- Will Fuller (2013), NFL player
- Tony Carr (2016), basketball player in the Israeli Premier Basketball League
- Lamar Stevens (2016), NBA basketball player
- Seth Lundy, (2019), NBA basketball player
- Jalen Duren (2022; transferred), NBA basketball player

=== Government ===
- James P. McGranery (1913), United States Attorney General under U.S. president Harry S. Truman
- Daniel J. Terra (1927), the United States' first and only Ambassador at Large for Cultural Affairs
- Albert F. Sabo (1938), judge who presided over the Mumia Abu-Jamal murder case.
- Raymond F. Lederer (1957), Pennsylvania House of Representatives 1974–1977 United States House of Representatives (1977 to 1981)
- Charles Hammock, Member of the Pennsylvania House of Representatives
- Eugene F. McGill, Member of the Pennsylvania House of Representatives (1995 to 2006)

=== Religion ===
- Peter Keenan Guilday (1901), monsignor, Catholic Church historian in the U.S.
- John J. Bonner (1908), monsignor, Educator, Superintendent of Schools Archdiocese of Philadelphia (1926-1945), Founder of the Philadelphia Catholic League
- Joseph A. Pepe (1960), former bishop of the Diocese of Las Vegas
- Michael Joseph Bransfield, former bishop of the Diocese of Wheeling-Charleston, permanently excluded from engaging in any form of public ministry in the Catholic Church
- Daniel E. Thomas (1977), current bishop of the Diocese of Toledo

=== Entertainment ===
- Joseph I. Breen (1906), public relations agent and film censor
- John Facenda (1931), radio and television broadcaster from the 1930s through the early 1980s
- Charles Fuller (1955), African American playwright and screenwriter, won the 1982 Pulitzer Prize for A Soldier's Play, a story about racism in the military
- Larry Neal (1956), scholar of African American theater, professor at Yale University, and playwright who was a leader of the Black Arts Movement

== Rectors and Presidents ==
- Msgr. Nevin F. Fisher (1890–1902)
- Msgr. Hugh T. Henry (1902–1919)
- Msgr. William P. McNally (1919–1933)
- Rev. Leo D. Burns (1933–1938)
- Rev. John A. Cartin (1938–1952)
- Msgr. James T. Dolan (1952–1966)
- Msgr. Charles V. Gallen (1966–1975)
- Rev. Edward Cahill (1975–1981)
- Rev. Richard J. McLoughlin (1981–1990)
- Msgr. Francis W. Beach `67 (1990–1997)
- Rev. Paul C. Brandt (1997–2006)
- Rev. Joseph W. Bongard `77 (2006–2010)
- Rev. John B. Flanagan (2010–2014)
- Rev. Joseph W. Bongard `77 (2014–2023)
- Mr. John A. Prendergast `08 (2024–Present)
