= Catholic literary revival =

Literary movement in France and England

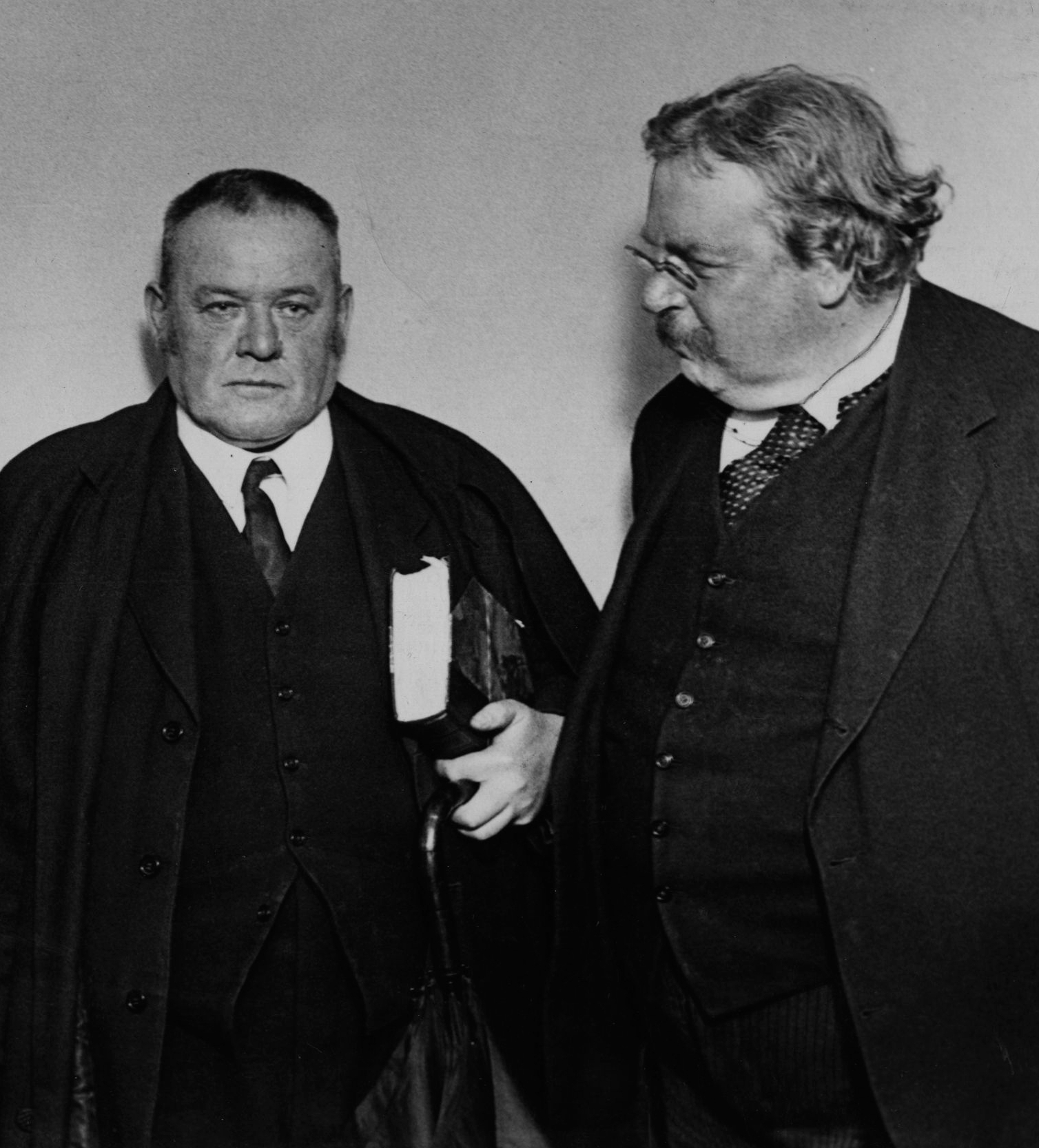
Hilaire Belloc and G. K. Chesterton

The Catholic literary revival is a term that has been applied to a movement towards explicit Catholic allegiance and themes among leading literary figures in France and England, roughly in the century from 1860 to 1960. This often involved conversion to Catholicism or a conversion-like return to the Catholic Church. The phenomenon is sometimes extended to the United States.

== France ==
French authors sometimes grouped in a Catholic literary revival include Léon Bloy, Joris-Karl Huysmans, Charles Péguy, Paul Claudel, Georges Bernanos and François Mauriac, as well as the philosophers Jacques Maritain and Gabriel Marcel.

== England ==
The main figures who have been seen as constituting a revival of a leading Catholic presence in national literary life in England include John Henry Newman, Gerard Manley Hopkins, Hilaire Belloc, G. K. Chesterton, Alfred Noyes, Robert Hugh Benson, Ronald Knox, Muriel Spark, Graham Greene, and Evelyn Waugh. Of these, Belloc was the only writer raised a Catholic; the others were adult converts.

J. R. R. Tolkien, although a convinced Catholic, "is not generally perceived to be one of the key protagonists of the Catholic literary revival". In his writing, his own Catholic convictions and his use of Catholic themes are far less explicit than was the case for the other writers mentioned. There is, however, a growing tendency to look at Tolkien within the English Catholic literary tradition of his time.

Although distinct, a movement towards explicit religious loyalty and themes in Anglican and Anglo-Catholic writers such as George MacDonald, T. S. Eliot, C. S. Lewis and Dorothy L. Sayers is sometimes linked to the Catholic literary revival as a broader phenomenon.

== United States ==
Due to the influence of Catholic literature from England in the United States, the concept of "Catholic revival" is sometimes extended to include American authors such as Dorothy Day, Thomas Merton, William Thomas Walsh, Warren Carroll, Fulton Sheen, Walker Percy, J. F. Powers and Flannery O'Connor. One of the early leaders of the revival in the United States was the editor and publisher Francis X. Talbot.

At least two Catholic literary societies were founded in the United States in the early 1930s. The Gallery of Living Catholic Authors was founded in 1932 to promote contemporaneous Catholic literature, and counted such figures as Jacques Maritain, Hilaire Belloc, Claude McKay and G.K. Chesterton among its members. It was active until the 1960s. The Catholic Poetry Society was founded in 1931 to further a tradition of Catholic poetry. They published Spirit: A Magazine of Poetry.
