= Queen Creek Unified School District =

School district in Maricopa County, Arizona

Coordinates: 33.233672°N 111.646955°W

Address
- 20217 East Chandler Heights Road Queen Creek, Arizona, 85142; United States

District information
- Type: Public
- Grades: PreK–12
- NCES District ID: 0406810

Students and staff
- Students: 10,269
- Teachers: 499.33 (FTE)
- Staff: 535.01 (FTE)
- Student–teacher ratio: 20.57

Other information
- Website: www.qcusd.org

Queen Creek Unified School District (QCUSD) is a school district in Maricopa County, Arizona, that serves most of the town of Queen Creek and a portion of the city of Mesa. It was formed in 1947 from land once part of the Higley Unified School District (at the time, neither district was unified; Queen Creek High School would not open until 1967).

== High schools ==
High Schools	Mascot	Address	Principal (2024-2025)	Established
Queen Creek High School (Home)	Bulldogs	22149 E Ocotillo Rd, Queen Creek, AZ 85142	Scott Lovely	1967
Eastmark High School (Home)	Firebirds	9560 East Ray Road Mesa, Arizona 85212 United States	Christopher Webb	2019
Crimson High School (Home)	Rattlers	21942 E Riggs Rd, Queen Creek, AZ 85142, United States	Elyse Torbert	2022

== Middle Schools ==
Middle Schools	Mascot	Address	Principal (2024-2025)	Established
Queen Creek Junior High (Home)	Wildcats	20435 S Ellsworth Rd, Queen Creek, AZ 85242	Beverly Nichols	
Newell Barney Junior High (Home)	Buccaneers	24937 S Sossaman Rd, Queen Creek, AZ 85142	Kevin Aikins	2008
Eastmark Junior High (Home)	Firebirds	9560 East Ray Road Mesa, Arizona 85212	Christopher Webb	2019
Crimson Junior High (Home)	Rattlers	21942 E Riggs Rd, Queen Creek, AZ 85142, United States	Elyse Torbert	2022

== Elementary schools ==
- Frances Brandon-Pickett
- Desert Mountain
- Jack Barnes
- Queen Creek
- Mountain Trail Academy
- Faith Mather Sossaman
- Gateway Polytechnic Academy
- Silver Valley
- Schnepf
- Katherine Mecham Barney

== See also ==
- Chandler Unified School District
- Higley Unified School District
