= Greensburg-Salem School District =

School district in Pennsylvania

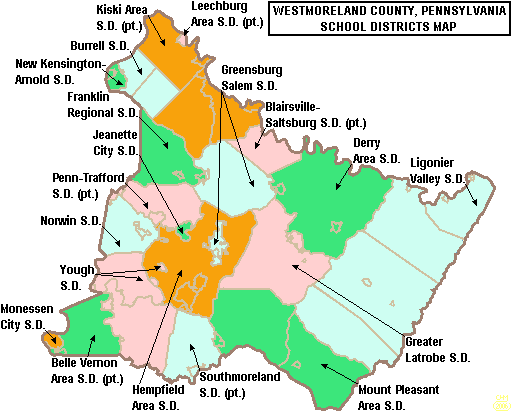

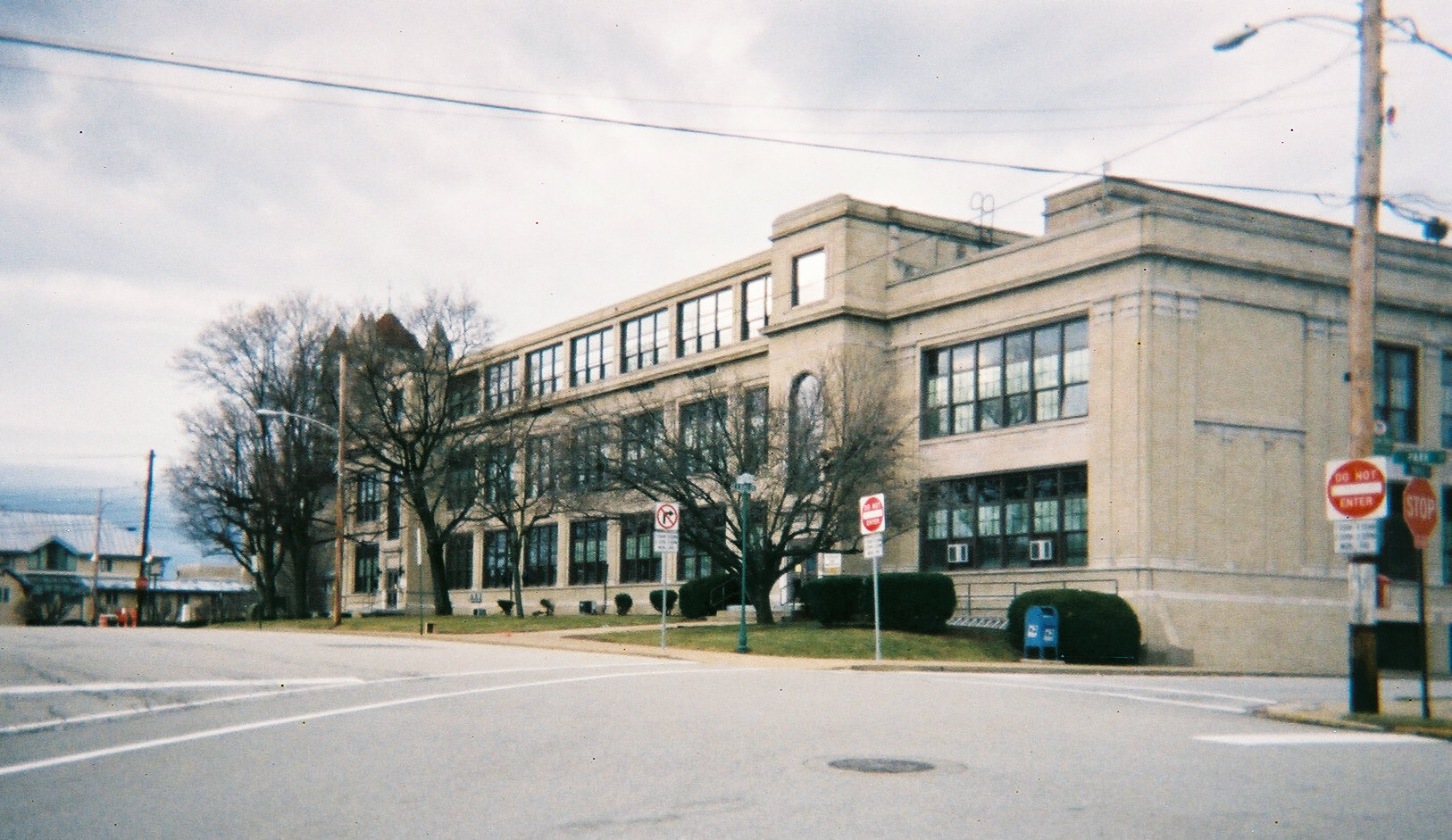
- Greensburg-Salem Middle School

Address
- 1 Academy Hill Place Greensburg, Westmoreland, Pennsylvania, 15601-1839; United States
- Coordinates: 40.306270°N 79.545560°W

District information
- Type: Public
- Motto: Effort Creates Ability
- Grades: KG–12
- Superintendent: Ken Bissell
- Business administrator: Joan Wehner
- School board: Greensburg Salem School Board
- Chair of the board: Jeff Metrosky
- Governing agency: Pennsylvania Department of Education
- Schools: 5
- Budget: $46 million
- NCES District ID: 4210920
- District ID: PA-107653203

Students and staff
- Students: 2,612
- Teachers: 183.00 (on an FTE basis)
- Staff: 86.00 (on an FTE basis)
- Student–teacher ratio: 14.27:1
- Athletic conference: PIAA, WPIAL
- District mascot: Golden Lion
- Colors: Gold, Brown, and White

Other information
- State test: PSSA
- Schedule: M–F except state holidays
- Website: www.greensburgsalem.org

The Greensburg-Salem School District is a public school district in Westmoreland County, Pennsylvania. The City of Greensburg as well as South Greensburg Boro, Southwest Greensburg Boro, and Salem Township are within district boundaries.

The district is starting to add in more STEAM education.

== Schools ==
There are three K–5 elementary schools, the 6–8 Greensburg-Salem Middle School and the 9–12 Greensburg-Salem High School.

=== Elementary schools ===
Amos K. Hutchinson Elementary School
810 Welty Street
Greensburg, Pennsylvania 15601

James H. Metzger Elementary School
140 C.C. Hall Drive
New Alexandria, Pennsylvania 15670

Robert F. Nicely Elementary School
55 McLaughlin Drive
Greensburg, Pennsylvania 15601

=== Middle school ===
Greensburg Salem Middle School
301 North Main Street
Greensburg, Pennsylvania 15601

=== High school ===
Greensburg-Salem High School
65 Mennel Drive
Greensburg, Pennsylvania 15601
