= Greensburg Salem High School =

Greensburg-Salem High School

Location
- 65 Mennel Dr; Greensburg, Westmoreland, Pennsylvania 15601-1344; United States
- Coordinates: 40.3264°N 79.5413°W

Information
- Type: Public high school
- Motto: It's a Great Day to be a Golden Lion/ Children First- Engagement Always/ Effort Creates Ability
- Status: Currently operational
- School board: Greensburg Salem School Board
- School district: Greensburg-Salem School District
- NCES District ID: 4210920
- Oversight: Pennsylvania Department of Education
- Superintendent: Ken Bissell
- CEEB code: 391575
- NCES School ID: 421092004373
- President: Ronald Mellinger, Jr.
- Principal: Adam Jones
- Teaching staff: 58.50 (FTE)
- Grades: 9–12
- Enrollment: 784 (2024–2025)
  - Grade 9: 207
  - Grade 10: 288
  - Grade 11: 195
  - Grade 12: 194
- Student to teacher ratio: 13.40
- Campus type: Suburban
- Student Union/Association: Student Council Association
- Colors: Gold, Brown, and White
- Athletics conference: PIAA, WPIAL
- Nickname: Golden Lions
- USNWR ranking: 11,118
- Newspaper: Lions Den
- Feeder schools: Greensburg-Salem Middle School
- Website: gshs.greensburgsalem.org

The Greensburg-Salem High School (GSHS) is a public high school which is located in Greensburg, Pennsylvania, in the United States.

Greensburg-Salem High School is the only high school in the Greensburg-Salem School District, which is situated thirty-five miles east-southeast of Pittsburgh in the center of Westmoreland County. It covers an area of fifty-one square miles that includes urban, suburban, and rural populations.

For 2022, U.S. News & World Report ranked GSHS 11,118th best of 17,843 U.S. public high schools, 435th best of 718 Pennsylvania public high schools, and 78th best among 132 Pittsburgh-area public high schools.

== Curriculum ==
GSHS students who wish to choose a vocational or technical program may attend Central Westmoreland Career and Technology Center in New Stanton.

== Extracurricular activities ==
=== Athletics ===
In addition to academics, Greensburg-Salem fields several sports teams.

==== Boys ====
- Baseball – Class AAA
- Basketball – Class AAA
- Bowling – Class AAAA
- Cross Country – Class AAA
- Ice hockey – Class AA
- Football – Class AAAA
- Golf – Class AAAA (WPIAL Champions 1943, 1997)
- Soccer – Class AA
- Swimming and Diving – Class AA
- Tennis – Class AA
- Track and Field – Class AAA
- Wrestling – Class AAA

==== Girls ====
- Basketball – Class AAA
- Bowling – Class AAAA
- Cross Country – Class AAA
- Field Hockey – Class AA
- Lacrosse – Class AAAA
- Soccer – Class AAA
- Softball – Class AAA (WPIAL Champions 2013)
- Swimming and Diving – Class AA
- Tennis – Class AAA
- Track and Field – Class AAA
- Volleyball – Class AA (WPIAL & PIAA Champions 1998)

== Notable alumni ==
- Carroll Baker - American actor
- Greg Jones – American collegiate wrestling champion
- Brennan Marion – American football coach and player
- Robert Mitinger – American football player
- Jess Quatse – collegiate All-American (American football), professional football player and coach
- Al Wesbecher – American football player, collegiate football coach
- Wayne Wolff – American football player

== See also ==
Official website
