= Eastmark High School =

High school in Mesa, Arizona

Location
- 9560 East Ray Road; Mesa, Arizona 85212; United States; 33.323802°N 111.627518°W

Information
- Type: Public high school
- Opened: July 24, 2019
- School district: Queen Creek Unified School District
- Principal: Chris Webb
- Teaching staff: 91.60 (FTE)
- Grades: 7–12
- Enrollment: 1,887 (2023-2024)
- Student to teacher ratio: 20.60
- Colors: Teal and copper
- Mascot: Firebirds
- Website: ehs.qcusd.org

Eastmark High School is a junior high and high school in Mesa, Arizona, the second public high school operated by the Queen Creek Unified School District. It is located in the Eastmark master-planned community on the site of the former Mesa General Motors proving grounds. Its cross streets are Ray Road between Ellsworth Road and Signal Butte Road.

== History ==
In November 2017, voters in the Queen Creek Unified School District approved a $63 million bond package, as well as the repurposing of a 2014 bond, to allow the district to build a new high school and two new elementary schools, after a $95 million proposal had been defeated in 2016. The new schools, in the northern part of the district, would alleviate lengthy commutes. In August 2018, the district voted to name the school Eastmark High School, after the community in which it is located. Ground was broken on the high school on March 29, 2018, and the first day of classes for 800 students in grades 7 through 10 was July 31, 2019.

The school, currently with 154,000 square feet (14,300 m^{2}) of space, is planned to allow the construction of two further phases to bring its capacity from 1,350 to 2,800; the future phases would add a performing arts center, auxiliary gym, additional classrooms and an auditorium.

== Curriculum ==
Eastmark is organized into four "Career Plan Academies", which allow students to specialize in STEM, medical and social health, business and marketing, and fine arts; each academy has its own setting and environment within the campus.

== Athletics ==
2022 football 3A Arizona State Champions
