= Queen Creek, Arizona =

Town in Maricopa and Pinal counties in Arizona, United States

- Town
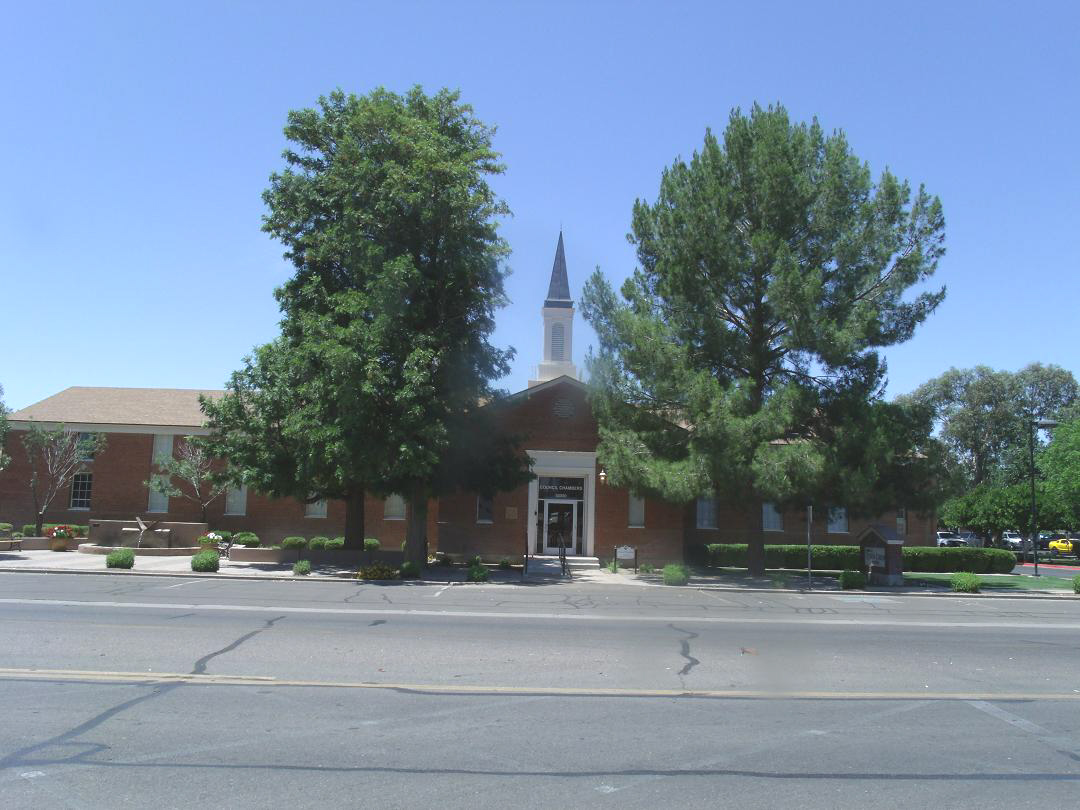
- Queen Creek Town Hall

- Flag Seal

- Location in Maricopa and Pinal counties
- Coordinates: 33°14′55″N 111°38′03″W
- Country: United States
- State: Arizona
- Counties: Maricopa, Pinal
- Incorporated: September 5, 1989

Government
  - Mayor: Julia Wheatley

Area
  - Total: 42.130 sq mi (109.116 km^{2})
  - Land: 42.102 sq mi (109.043 km^{2})
  - Water: 0.028 sq mi (0.073 km^{2})
- Elevation: 1,417 ft (432 m)

Population (2020)
  - Total: 59,519
  - Estimate (2025): 87,006
  - Rank: US: 483th AZ: 16th
  - Density: 1,688/sq mi (651.6/km^{2})
- Time zone: UTC–7 (Mountain (MST) (no DST))
- ZIP Codes: 85140, 85142, 85143, 85144
- Area code: 480
- FIPS code: 04-58150
- GNIS feature ID: 2412518
- Sales tax: 8.55%
- Website: www.queencreekaz.gov

Queen Creek is a town in the state of Arizona, United States, mostly in Maricopa County but partly in Pinal County. The population was 59,519 at the 2020 census, and is 83,700 as of 2024.

Queen Creek is a suburb of Phoenix, located in the far southeast of the Phoenix Metropolitan Area – known locally as the Valley of the Sun – which the United States Office of Management and Budget designates as the Phoenix–Mesa–Chandler Metropolitan Statistical Area (MSA). As such, it is also part of the Arizona Sun Corridor megaregion.

== History ==
Based on the post office form on file at the National Archives, Queen Creek was originally known as Rittenhouse, after C. H. Rittenhouse, the community having grown out of a railroad stop he constructed after forming the Queen Creek Farms Company in 1919 and needed a shipping point for his produce. This became a flag stop used for transportation into Phoenix.

The eponymous creek after which the city is named once flowed through Queen Canyon and was originally called Picket Post Creek, before being named for the Silver Queen Mine. The creek is typically more of a dry arroyo.

The town incorporated on September 5, 1989.

== Geography ==
The town of Queen Creek is primarily within Maricopa County, but the town limits extended into Pinal County on the eastern and southern borders when they annexed the Ironwood Crossing neighborhood in 2018.

The city of Mesa borders Queen Creek to the north, and the city of Apache Junction lies to the northeast. To the east is the town of San Tan Valley in Pinal County, while on the southeast is the planning area of the town of Florence. South of Queen Creek is the 10,200-acre (4,100 ha) San Tan Mountain Regional Park, and on the west is the town of Gilbert.

According to the United States Census Bureau, the town of Queen Creek has a total area of 42.130 square miles (109.12 km^{2}), of which 0.028 square miles (0.07 km^{2}), or 0.07%, are water.

== Climate ==
Typical of the Sonoran Desert, Queen Creek has a hot desert climate (Köppen: BWh), characterized by long, extremely hot summers and mild winters. The region is one of the sunniest on Earth, receiving over 3,800 hours of bright sunshine annually. While precipitation is sparse, it follows a bimodal pattern. The primary rainy season is the North American Monsoon, which occurs from July to mid-September, bringing moisture from the south that results in dramatic thunderstorms. A secondary, gentler rainy season occurs during the winter from Pacific frontal systems. This two-season rainfall pattern makes the Sonoran Desert the most biodiverse desert in the world, supporting a richer ecology than drier, single-season rainfall climates like the Mojave Desert.

The official weather observation station is located at the nearby Phoenix-Mesa Gateway Airport. The all-time record high temperature is 119 °F (48 °C), recorded on two separate occasions, while the all-time record low is 15 °F (−9 °C). This record low was set during the "Great Freeze of 1963," a historic arctic outbreak that devastated the agricultural industry across the Southwest. Specifically citrus was hit the hardest. Citrus groves took years to recover. Summers are defined by persistent and extreme heat; on average, temperatures reach or exceed 100 °F (38 °C) on 103 days per year, with 11 of those days reaching 110 °F (43 °C) or more. In contrast, while light frosts can occur, a hard freeze where temperatures drop to 28 °F (−2 °C) or below is rare, happening only every couple of years on average.

The following table contains the monthly climate normals and record extremes for Queen Creek.

Climate data for Queen Creek, Arizona (Phoenix-Mesa Gateway Airport), 1991–2020 normals, extremes 1948–present
Month	Jan	Feb	Mar	Apr	May	Jun	Jul	Aug	Sep	Oct	Nov	Dec	Year
Record high °F (°C)	88 (31)	92 (33)	99 (37)	106 (41)	114 (46)	119 (48)	119 (48)	116 (47)	113 (45)	107 (42)	94 (34)	83 (28)	119 (48)
Mean maximum °F (°C)	75 (24)	79 (26)	88 (31)	97 (36)	105 (41)	113 (45)	114 (46)	112 (44)	107 (42)	99 (37)	85 (29)	74 (23)	115 (46)
Mean daily maximum °F (°C)	66.5 (19.2)	69.6 (20.9)	76.9 (24.9)	84.8 (29.3)	93.9 (34.4)	103.1 (39.5)	104.9 (40.5)	103.5 (39.7)	98.5 (36.9)	87.0 (30.6)	74.7 (23.7)	65.4 (18.6)	85.7 (29.8)
Daily mean °F (°C)	54.2 (12.3)	57.0 (13.9)	63.3 (17.4)	70.1 (21.2)	79.1 (26.2)	87.8 (31.0)	92.2 (33.4)	91.1 (32.8)	85.8 (29.9)	73.5 (23.1)	61.6 (16.4)	53.3 (11.8)	72.4 (22.4)
Mean daily minimum °F (°C)	41.9 (5.5)	44.4 (6.9)	49.6 (9.8)	55.5 (13.1)	64.2 (17.9)	72.4 (22.4)	79.5 (26.4)	78.7 (25.9)	73.0 (22.8)	60.0 (15.6)	48.5 (9.2)	41.2 (5.1)	59.1 (15.1)
Mean minimum °F (°C)	31 (−1)	34 (1)	39 (4)	45 (7)	53 (12)	63 (17)	72 (22)	71 (22)	63 (17)	48 (9)	36 (2)	30 (−1)	28 (−2)
Record low °F (°C)	15 (−9)	22 (−6)	26 (−3)	32 (0)	37 (3)	49 (9)	58 (14)	55 (13)	42 (6)	30 (−1)	22 (−6)	19 (−7)	15 (−9)
Average precipitation inches (mm)	0.91 (23)	1.02 (26)	0.88 (22)	0.27 (6.9)	0.18 (4.6)	0.06 (1.5)	1.08 (27)	1.11 (28)	0.69 (18)	0.57 (14)	0.63 (16)	0.88 (22)	8.28 (210)
Average precipitation days (≥ 0.01 in)	3.9	3.7	2.9	1.4	1.1	0.4	3.7	4.1	2.5	2.1	2.2	3.5	31.5
Source 1: NOAA
Source 2: Western Regional Climate Center

== Demographics ==
Historical population
Census	Pop.	Note	%±
1980	1,378		—
1990	2,667		93.5%
2000	4,316		61.8%
2010	26,361		510.8%
2020	59,519		125.8%
2025 (est.)	89,770	▲	50.8%
U.S. Decennial Census; 2020 Census

=== Racial and ethnic composition ===
Queen Creek town, Arizona – Racial composition Note: the US Census treats Hispanic/Latino as an ethnic category. This table excludes Latinos from the racial categories and assigns them to a separate category. Hispanics/Latinos may be of any race.
Race (NH = Non-Hispanic)	2020	2010	2000	1990
White alone (NH)	72.6% (43,202)	74% (19,516)	67.7% (2,921)	67.8% (1,807)
Black alone (NH)	3.2% (1,875)	3.2% (841)	0.3% (14)	1% (27)
American Indian alone (NH)	0.6% (377)	0.5% (123)	0.5% (22)	0.8% (21)
Asian alone (NH)	2.4% (1,430)	2.7% (709)	0.3% (14)	0.7% (19)
Pacific Islander alone (NH)	0.2% (98)	0.1% (31)	0.1% (3)	
Other race alone (NH)	0.4% (250)	0.1% (30)	0% (1)	0.3% (9)
Multiracial (NH)	4.5% (2,651)	2.1% (545)	1.1% (47)	—
Hispanic/Latino (any race)	16.2% (9,636)	17.3% (4,566)	30% (1,294)	29.4% (784)

=== 2020 census ===
As of the 2020 census, there were 59,519 people in Queen Creek. The population density was 1,476.3 inhabitants per square mile (570.0/km^{2}). The median age was 35.8 years. 31.2% of residents were under the age of 18, 6.3% were under the age of 5, and 12.2% were 65 years of age or older. For every 100 females, there were 98.9 males, and for every 100 females age 18 and over, there were 95.4 males.

98.8% of residents lived in urban areas, while 1.2% lived in rural areas.

There were 17,965 households and 15,549 families in Queen Creek. Of the households, 48.2% had children under the age of 18 living in them. 73.2% were married-couple households, 8.4% were households with a male householder and no spouse or partner present, and 13.4% were households with a female householder and no spouse or partner present. 9.7% of all households were made up of individuals, and 4.4% had someone living alone who was 65 years of age or older.

There were 19,628 housing units, of which 8.5% were vacant. The homeowner vacancy rate was 2.4% and the rental vacancy rate was 6.0%.

=== 2010 census ===
As of the 2010 census, there were 26,361 people, 7,720 households, 6,557 families residing in the town. The population density was 940.1 inhabitants per square mile (363.0/km^{2}). There were 8,557 housing units at an average density of 49.6 per square mile (19.2/km^{2}). The racial makeup of the town was 83.6% White, 3.4% African American, 0.7% Native American, 2.8% Asian, 0.1% Pacific Islander, 5.8% from some other races and 3.6% from two or more races. Hispanic or Latino of any race were 17.3% of the population.

There were 7,720 households, out of which 50.7% had children under the age of 18 living with them, 75.9% were married couples living together, 7.2% had a female householder with no husband present, and 11.8% were non-families. 8.0% of all households were made up of individuals, and 2.8% had someone living alone who was 65 years of age or older. The average household size was 3.54 and the average family size was 3.77.

In the town, the population age spread was: 35.4% under the age of 18, 8.7% from 18 to 24, 30.1% from 25 to 44, 20.9% from 45 to 64, and 4.8% who were 65 years of age or older. The median age was 31 years. For every 100 females, there were 104.8 males. For every 100 females age 18 and over, there were 105.3 males.

The median income for a household in the town was $63,702, and the median income for a family was $65,679. Males had a median income of $45,000 versus $31,447 for females. The per capita income for the town was $21,592. About 6.0% of families and 9.2% of the population were below the poverty line, including 10.0% of those under age 18 and 6.5% of those age 65 or over.

== Education ==
The town of Queen Creek is served by six public school districts, as well as public charter schools and a private school.

The portion in Maricopa County is mostly in the Queen Creek Unified School District, with portions in the Higley Unified School District and the Chandler Unified School District.

The portion in Pinal County is divided between the Florence Unified School District, J. O. Combs Unified School District, and the Apache Junction Unified School District.

=== Elementary ===
- Auxier Elementary
- Cortina Elementary
- Desert Mountain Elementary
- Faith Mather Sossaman Elementary
- Frances Brandon-Pickett Elementary
- Jack Barnes Elementary
- Katherine Mecham Barney Elementary
- Queen Creek Elementary
- Schnepf Elementary

=== Junior/Senior High ===
- Sossaman Middle School
- Casteel High School
- Crismon High School
- Newell Barney College Prep
- Payne Junior High School
- Queen Creek High School
- Queen Creek Junior High School
- San Tan Foothills High School

=== Public Charter Schools ===
- American Leadership Academy
- Benjamin Franklin Charter School
- Eduprize School
- Heritage Academy-Gateway
- Legacy Traditional School-Queen Creek

=== Higher Education ===
- Communiversity at Queen Creek (Rio Salado College).

=== Former schools ===
The San Tan Historical Society Museum is located in the former Rittenhouse Elementary School building, which was a school from 1925 to 1982.

== Transportation ==
Queen Creek is a member of Valley Metro, but is not currently served by scheduled service. Valley Metro provides vanpools in Queen Creek.

== Notable people ==
- Mansel Carter, businessman and prospector
- Tony Huffman, racing driver
- Elio Mei, singer and songwriter
- Donovan Parisian, soccer player
- Brock Purdy, American football player
- Tait Reynolds, American football player
- GrammaCrackers, YouTuber

== Historic properties ==
There are various properties in the town of Queen Creek which are considered historical and have been included either in the National Register of Historic Places or listed as such by the San Tan Historical Society. The following are images of some of these properties with a short description.

Historical Structures in Queen Creek, Arizona
(NRHP = National Register of Historic Places)
(STHS = San Tan Historical Society.)
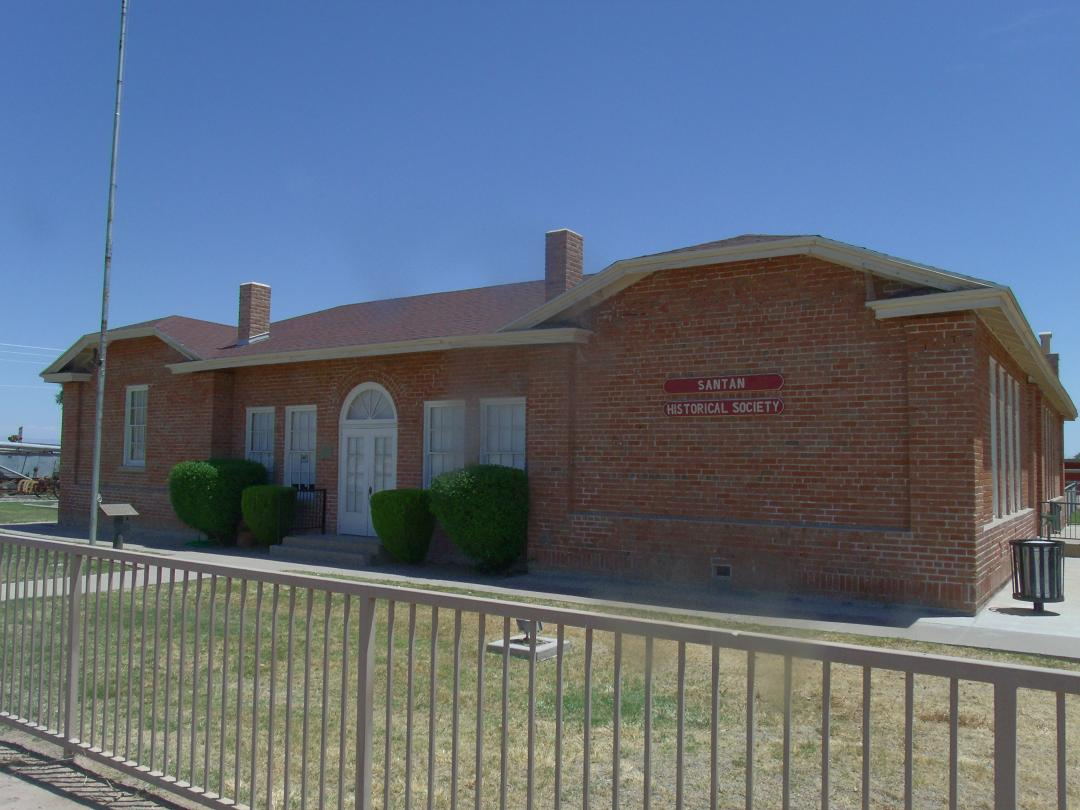
The Old Rittenhouse Elementary School, located on the S.E. corner of Ellsworth and Queen Creek Roads, was built in 1925. Used as a school through 1982, the building now houses the San Tan Historical Society. Listed in the National Register of Historic Places in 1998. Reference 98000053

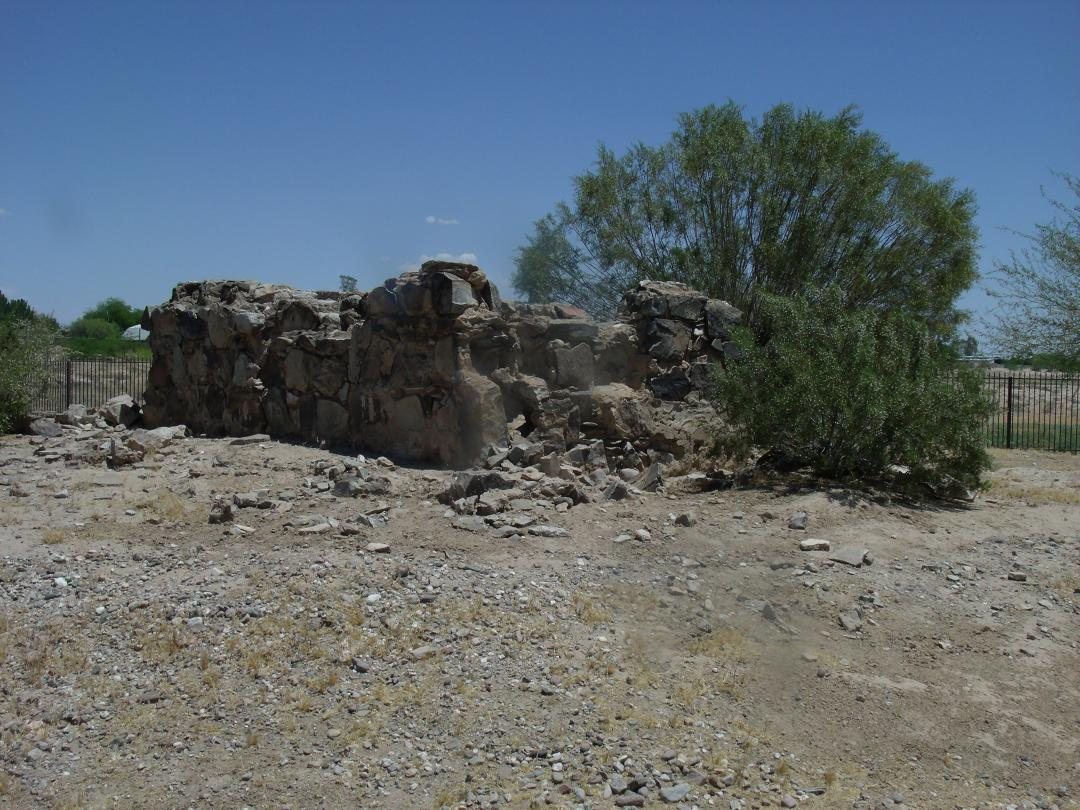
Ruins of the Desert Wells Stage Stop. Located just north of Chandler Heights Road on the east side of Sossaman Road, this site was a small spur stop for the Arizona Stage Company, founded in 1868. The stop provided water, shade, and protection for stages from Florence via Olberg and on to Mesa. Listed as historical by the San Tan Historical Society.

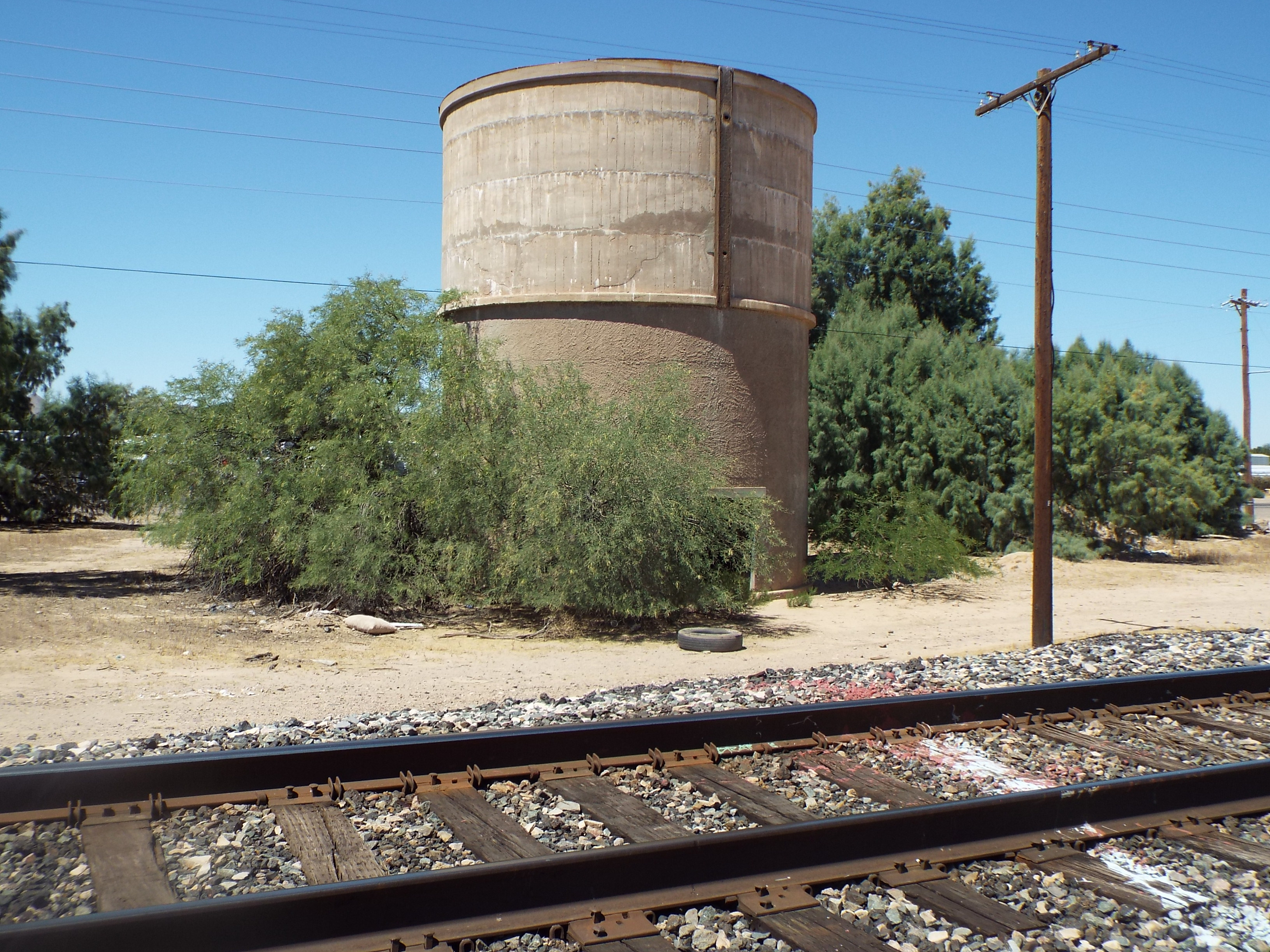
1900s Railroad Water Tank on Rittenhouse Road.

== See also ==
- List of historic properties in Queen Creek, Arizona
- Mansel Carter
- Pegasus Airpark
