= Quigley Catholic High School =

Private school in Baden, Pennsylvania, US

Location
- 200 Quigley Drive; Baden, Pennsylvania, (Beaver County) 15005; United States; 40°39′14″N 80°13′28″W

Information
- Type: Private, coeducational
- Religious affiliation: Roman Catholic
- Established: 1967
- Closed: 2020
- Grades: 9-12
- Colors: Burgundy & white
- Team name: Spartans
- Accreditation: Middle States Association of Colleges and Schools
- Newspaper: The Quigley Catholic Beacon
- Yearbook: Generations
- Website: www.quigleyspartans.com

Quigley Catholic High School was located in Baden, Pennsylvania. It was the only Roman Catholic high school in Beaver County, Pennsylvania. The school opened in 1967 and was named after Monsignor Thomas J. Quigley, and it closed at the end of the 2019-2020 school year.

== History ==
=== School history ===
In 1902, the Sisters of St. Joseph opened an academy for boys, and opened the Mt. Gallitzin High School for Girls in September 1913 at the suggestion of Bishop Hugh C. Boyle. The first class graduated in 1938, the centennial year of Baden Township. The school offered both academic and commercial courses. Once Quigley Catholic opened its doors in 1967 the school was forced to consolidate. At the time of the consolidation in 1967, the student enrollment was 245. There was one other school that consolidated to Quigley Catholic, St. Veronica's.

St. Veronica High School was opened in September 1924, under the supervision of Fr. John Martin, pastor, and the Sisters of St. Joseph who staffed the new parish high school. Seventeen students were in the first graduating class. Growth continued so quickly that within 15 years new space was desperately needed. Rev. James O’Connell and Rev. Paul Nee continued the education expansion at St. Veronica's. A building at 5th and Beaver Road was obtained through cooperation from the Ambridge School board in 1945. When a new school for elementary level students was built in 1959, the high school eventually moved back to its original home on Melrose Avenue. At the time of the consolidation in 1967 the enrollment of 243 included students from many other parishes besides St. Veronica.

In the mid-1960s the Superintendent of Schools for the Diocese of Pittsburgh was Auxiliary Bishop, Most Reverend John B. McDowell.

In 1966, under the supervision of Bishop McDowell, land was purchased from the Sisters of St. Joseph and ground was broken. Quigley Catholic High School first opened its doors to students in September 1967. The 440 students came to the new school while construction of the building was still being finished around them. The formal dedication and blessing of the building took place on April 28, 1968. The school opened under the leadership of Father Robert J. Reardon as Headmaster and with the guidance of Sister St. Bede Downey, CSJ, who continued to serve Quigley Catholic for many years until her death. Additional principals have been Rev. George Leech, John S. Hoehl, who was later convicted of sexual abuse, Sr. Anna Marie Gaglia, CSJ, Rev. Ronald R. Cellini, Rev. David C. Menegay, Dr. Madonna Helbling and Mrs. Rita McCormick. Growth and construction of one sort or another had been going on ever since. Quigley Catholic was the first and only regional Catholic high school in Beaver County.

=== About the namesake of Quigley ===
MONSIGNOR THOMAS J. QUIGLEY: 1905-1960 superintendent of schools for the Roman Catholic Diocese of Pittsburgh until his death in 1960

“…This new school has been named in honor of the late and beloved Monsignor Thomas J. Quigley, who was Superintendent of Schools from August 1939 to December 1955. This extraordinary priest served the diocese, its schools, and the general community as a spiritual leader and an accomplished educator from 1931 until his untimely death in 1960. No man gave so much to education or to the Church as did he. In every area of education he was outstanding. Readily recognized as a leader by public and non-public educators, this priest contributed, in an extraordinary way, to the development of education for all children and for all segments of our community. It is significant that the priests of Beaver County voted by an overwhelming majority to dedicate this school in his memory. In this way they hoped to memorialize and to express appreciation for a life spent in improving both the city of God and the city of humankind. Dedicated priest, scholarly educator, prolific writer, able administrator, but most of all a man committed to a cause – this was Monsignor Quigley. And while we honor his memory by naming this school after him, we do, in fact, honor this school by using his name and identifying it with all that is good in education and community life.” Auxiliary Bishop, Most Reverend John B. McDowell (then, Superintendent of Schools) April 1968 from the Dedication of Quigley Catholic High School.

== Academics ==
Quigley Catholic had been named as a Catholic High School of Excellence consistently and consecutively since the inception of the honor. This honor of distinction is earned by less than 5% of all Catholic high schools in the nation.

=== Speech and Debate and Mock Trial ===
Quigley Catholic High School was nationally recognized for its Forensics and Mock Trial teams.

==== Mock trial ====
The Mock Trial Team was coached by Tim Waxenfelter for 28 years and won nine Pennsylvania State Championships, making it the number one ranked team in the state. The Mock Trial team was national runner-up for the year 2002. The school most recently won the Beaver County Bar Association's Mock Trial competition in the year 2019, one year before closing its doors. The team consisted of 13 individuals, led by a senior captain and two sophomores attorneys.

== Controversy ==
(Fr.) John "Jack" S. Hoehl was school principal from 1971 to 1985. Hoehl was accused, by at least 7 men in 2001, of sexual abuse while they were students at Quigley Catholic High School during Hoehl's tenure as principal there. The lawsuits were dropped because the statute of limitations ran out. However, Hoehl was permanently banned from ministry in 1988 by then Bishop, Donald Wuerl, because Wuerl considered the accusations to be credible. On June 16, 2004, the Vatican severed all ties with Hoehl.

Hoehl went on to become a youth counselor in West Virginia. He was subsequently removed from this post by the West Virginia Board of Counselors because of the credible accusations of sexual abuse from former students at Quigley Catholic High School.
