= List of colleges and universities in Arizona =

This is a list of colleges and universities in Arizona. This list also includes other educational institutions providing higher education, meaning tertiary, quaternary, and, in some cases, post-secondary education.

== Active institutions ==
School	Location	Control	Carnegie Classification	Enrollment (Fall 2024)	Founded
Arizona State University	Tempe	Public	Doctoral University	152,812	1885
Northern Arizona University	Flagstaff	Public	Doctoral University	28,467	1899
University of Arizona	Tucson	Public	Doctoral University	56,365	1885
Grand Canyon University	Phoenix	Private (Not For Profit)	Doctoral University	113,257	1949
Arizona Christian University	Glendale	Private (Not For Profit)	Baccalaureate College	1,421	1960
Cummings Graduate Institute for Behavioral Health Studies	Phoenix	Private (Not For Profit)	Not classified		2015
Embry-Riddle Aeronautical University	Prescott	Private (Not For Profit)	Baccalaureate College	3,264	1978
Indigenous Bible College	Flagstaff	Private (Not For Profit)	Special Focus: Theological Studies	38	1958
International Baptist College and Seminary	Chandler	Private (Not For Profit)	Special Focus: Theological Studies	78	1981
Justice University	Chandler	Private (Not For Profit)	Not classified	124	2019
Midwestern University	Glendale	Private (Not For Profit)	Special Focus: Medical	3,738	1900
Ottawa University	Surprise	Private (Not For Profit)	Baccalaureate College	912	1865
Pathways College	Phoenix	Private (Not For Profit)	Special Focus: Business	196	2015
Prescott College	Prescott	Private (Not For Profit)	Master's University	867	1966
Sonoran University of Health Sciences	Tempe	Private (Not For Profit)	Special Focus: Other Health	516	1993
The School of Architecture	Scottsdale	Private (Not For Profit)	Special Focus: Other	8	1932
American InterContinental University System	Chandler	Private (For Profit)	Special Focus: Business	11,277	1970
Arizona College of Nursing	Glendale, Phoenix, Tempe, and Tucson	Private (For Profit)	Special Focus: Health Professions	3,396	1885
Arizona School of Acupuncture and Oriental Medicine	Tucson	Private (For Profit)	Special Focus: Other Health Professions	19	1995
Aspen University	Phoenix	Private (For Profit)	Special Focus: Nursing	3,511	1987
Brookline College	Phoenix, Tempe, and Tucson	Private (For Profit)	Special Focus: Health Professions	1,239	1972
Bryan University	Tempe	Private (For Profit)	Baccalaureate College	2,519	1940
Carrington College	Mesa, Phoenix, and Tucson	Private (For Profit)	Special Focus: Health Professions	2,125	1967
Chamberlain University	Phoenix	Private (For Profit)	Special Focus: Health Professions	693	1889
DeVry University	Phoenix	Private (For Profit)	Baccalaureate College	6	1931
Miller-Motte College - Arizona Automotive Institute	Glendale	Private (For Profit)	Special Focus: Business	689	1968
National Paralegal College (Crestpoint University)	Phoenix	Private (For Profit)	Baccalaureate College	446	2003
Pima Medical Institute	Mesa, Phoenix, and Tucson	Private (For Profit)	Special Focus: Applied and Career Studies	4,467	1972
Refrigeration School Inc	Phoenix	Private (For Profit)	Special Focus: Applied and Career Studies	1,417	1965
Sessions College for Professional Design	Tempe	Private (For Profit)	Special Focus: Art & Design	194	1997
Sonoran Desert Institute	Tempe	Private (For Profit)	Special Focus: Applied and Career Studies	5,437	2000
Southwest Institute of Healing Arts	Tempe	Private (For Profit)	Special Focus: Other Health Professions	534	1992
Universal Technical Institute	Avondale	Private (For Profit)	Special Focus: Technical	2,484	1965
University of Advancing Technology	Tempe	Private (For Profit)	Baccalaureate College	933	1983
University of Phoenix	Phoenix	Private (For Profit)	Doctoral University	111,248	1976

== Out-of-state institutions ==
- A.T. Still University, Phoenix
- Benedictine University, Mesa
- Park University, Gilbert
- Avila University, Goodyear

== Two-year institutions ==
- Arizona Western College, Yuma, San Luis, Quartzsite, Wellton, Somerton
- Central Arizona College, Coolidge, Casa Grande, Florence, Maricopa, Winkelman, Apache Junction, Queen Creek
- Cochise College, Douglas, Sierra Vista, Benson, Willcox, Fort Huachuca, Nogales
- Coconino Community College, Flagstaff, Williams, Page
- Eastern Arizona College, Thatcher
- Maricopa County Community College District
  - Chandler-Gilbert Community College, Chandler, Mesa, Sun Lakes
  - Estrella Mountain Community College, Avondale
  - GateWay Community College, Phoenix
  - Glendale Community College, Glendale
  - Mesa Community College, Mesa
  - Paradise Valley Community College, Phoenix
  - Phoenix College, Phoenix
  - Rio Salado Community College, distance learning community college, Tempe
  - Scottsdale Community College, Scottsdale
  - South Mountain Community College, Phoenix
- Mohave Community College, Kingman, Bullhead City, Lake Havasu City
- Northland Pioneer College, Snowflake, Show Low, Holbrook, Winslow
- Pima Community College, Tucson
- Yavapai College, Prescott, Sedona, Clarkdale, Chino Valley

== Tribal institutions ==
- Navajo Nation
  - Diné College, Tsaile
- Tohono O'odham Nation
  - Tohono O'odham Community College, Sells

== Defunct institutions ==
School	Location	Control	Carnegie Classification	Founded	Closed
Anthem Education Group	Glendale	Private (For Profit)	Doctoral University	1970	
Arizona Summit Law School	Phoenix	Private (For Profit)	Doctoral University	2005	2018
The Art Institute of Phoenix	Phoenix	Private (For Profit)	Masters University	1969	
The Art Institute of Tucson	Tucson	Private (For Profit)	Baccalaureate / Associates Colleges	1996	
Brown Mackie College	Phoenix	Private (For Profit)	Baccalaureate / Associates Colleges	1892	2017
Le Cordon Bleu College of Culinary Arts Scottsdale	Scottsdale	Private (For Profit)	Special-focus Institution	1986	2017
CollegeAmerica	Phoenix	Private (For Profit)	Baccalaureate / Associates Colleges	1964	
Collins College	Phoenix	Private (For Profit)	Associate's College	1978	2012
Phoenix Institute of Herbal Medicine & Acupuncture	Phoenix	Private (For Profit)	Special Focus: Other Health Professions	1996	2026
Phoenix Seminary	Phoenix	Private (Not For Profit)	Special Focus: Faith-based	1988	2026
Southwest University of Visual Arts	Tucson	Private (For Profit)	Baccalaureate / Associates Colleges	1983	2020

== See also ==
- List of college athletic programs in Arizona
- Arizona Board of Regents
- Higher education in the United States
- List of American institutions of higher education
- List of recognized higher education accreditation organizations
- List of colleges and universities
- List of colleges and universities by country
