= Hispanic-Serving Institution =

Type of education institution in the United States

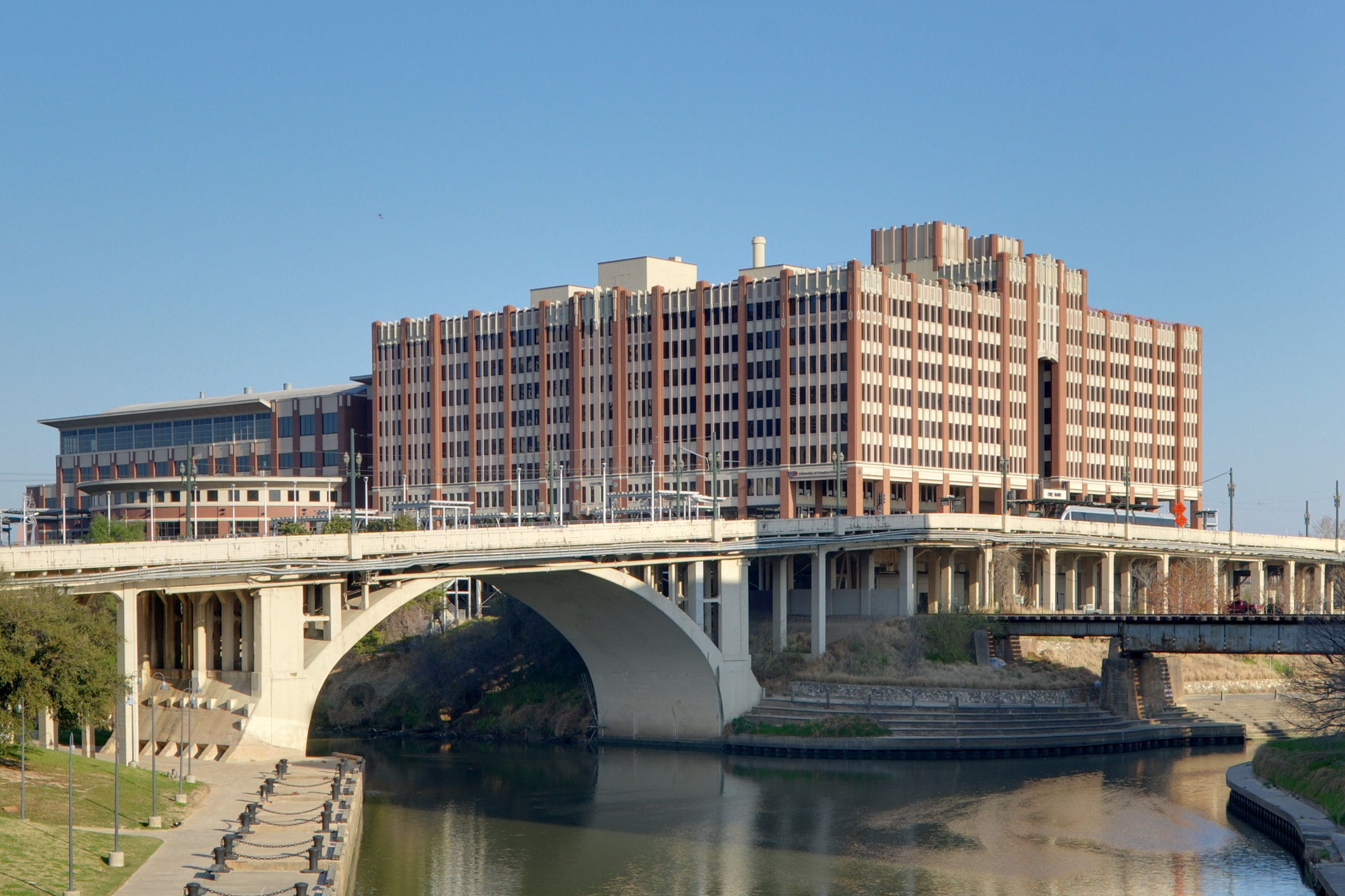
University of Houston–Downtown

A Hispanic-Serving Institution (HSI) is an accredited, degree-granting, public or private nonprofit institution of higher education in the United States that has at least 25% of Hispanic or Latinos undergraduate student enrollment, as defined by federal law.

In the 2021–22 academic year, 572 institutions met the federal criteria, up from 539 institutions in the 2018–19 academic year.

== Background ==
According to Title III of the Higher Education Act of 1965, in order for an HSI to receive federal funding it must satisfy the following criteria:

- Have a least 25 percent Hispanic or Latino undergraduate full-time equivalent student enrollment.
- Must be an eligible public or private non-profit institution of higher education
- Must offer at least two-year academic programs that lead to a degree
- Must be accredited by an agency or association recognized by the Department of Education
- Must have high enrollment of students in need

The Department of Education offers grants to institutions defined as HSIs which can be used for many academic purposes serving all ethnicities at the institution including faculty development, funds and administrative management, development and improvement of academic programs, endowment funds, curriculum development, scientific or laboratory equipment for teaching, renovation of instructional facilities, joint use of facilities, academic tutoring, counseling programs and student support services.

Any HSI can benefit from the assistance to increase the amount of Hispanic or Latino students in higher education, and the amount of Hispanic or Latino students graduating from a higher education institution. To be considered an HSI, universities have to meet certain criteria: 2-and 4-year colleges and universities had to have at least a 25% Hispanic or Latino enrollment total. This percentage was the minimum required by the Higher Education Act in 1992 (Laden, 2001). Because HSIs goals are to serve primarily Hispanic populations (Shehadeh & Termos, 2014), they are found in metropolitan areas with increasing Hispanic and Latino populations. Some of these areas include Los Angeles, San Antonio, Chicago, Philadelphia, Detroit, and Miami (Laden, 2001). Vigil discusses the increasing rates of Latinos in these areas due to the demand of unskilled temporary labor and for seemingly attainable housing opportunities. Although HSI's help Latino students in higher education, "HSI's do not have a declared, specific mission to serve Hispanics" (Laden, 2001).

Title V of the Act, introduced in 1998, is another funding stream specifically for HSIs to assist them in improving their higher educational provision.

== Hispanic Association of Colleges and Universities ==
In 1992, the Hispanic Association of Colleges and Universities led the effort to convince Congress to formally recognize campuses with high Hispanic enrollment as federally designated HSIs and to begin targeting federal appropriations to those campuses. Today, HACU represents nearly 470 colleges and universities committed to Hispanic higher education success in the U.S., Puerto Rico, Latin America, Spain and Portugal. Although HACU member institutions in the U.S. represent less than 13% of all higher education institutions nationwide, together they enroll more than two-thirds of all Hispanic college students. HACU is the only national educational association that represents Hispanic-Serving Institutions (HSIs).

== Funding ==
HSI federal funding grew in the early years (1998–2004) of Title V (the original and still linchpin HSI federal funding program), then leveled off from 2004-07 as the number of HSIs and Hispanic college students continued to grow. It increased dramatically in 2008 with the addition of the HSI STEM program, but since the Recession of 2009–10, it has actually declined while HSIs and Hispanic enrollments have increased even more rapidly.

One of the main challenges HSIs face as they address their critical role is persistent underfunding relative to other degree-granting institutions. According to 2016–17 IPEDS data, HSIs on average received $3,117 per student on average from all federal revenue sources, compared to $4,605 per student for all degree-granting institutions, just two-thirds the funding to educate a disproportionately low-income student population. The result is that HSIs only receive on average 68 cents for every federal dollar going to all other colleges and universities annually.

== Largest Hispanic university enrollments ==
2019–2020 total enrollment, 4-year schools
Program	Ranking
1	Miami Dade College
2	Dallas College
3	Florida International University
4	South Texas College
5	Lone Star College System
6	The University of Texas Rio Grande Valley
7	Grand Canyon University
8	Bakersfield College
9	San Jacinto Community College
10	Valencia College
11	The University of Texas at El Paso
12	Austin Community College District
13	University of Central Florida
14	Rio Hondo College
15	Santa Ana College
16	Broward College
17	California State University, Northridge
18	The University of Texas at San Antonio
19	California State University, Fullerton
20	Arizona State University Campus Immersion
21	California State University, Los Angeles
22	Western Governors University
23	California State University, Long Beach
24	Southern New Hampshire University
25	University of Houston
26	College of Southern Nevada
27	Texas A & M University College Station
28	Texas State University
29	The University of Texas at Arlington
30	Santa Monica College
31	University of Phoenix Arizona
32	California State University, San Bernardino
33	California State University, Fresno
34	California State Polytechnic University, Pomona
35	Modesto Junior College

While Hispanics study in colleges and universities throughout the country, some choose to attend federally-designated Hispanic-serving institutions, institutions that are accredited, degree-granting, public or private nonprofit institutions of higher education with 25 percent or more total undergraduate Hispanic full-time equivalent (FTE) student enrollment. There are over 600 institutions of higher education that have been designated as an HSI.

Universities with the largest Hispanic undergraduate enrollment (2013)

Rank	University	Hispanic enrollment	% of student body
1	Florida International University	24,105	67%
2	University of Texas at El Paso	15,459	81%
3	University of Texas Pan American	15,009	91%
4	University of Texas at San Antonio	11,932	47%
5	California State University at Northridge	11,774	38%
6	California State University at Fullerton	11,472	36%
7	Arizona State University	11,465	19%
8	California State University at Long Beach	10,836	35%
9	California State University at Los Angeles	10,392	58%
10	University of Central Florida	10,255	20%

Universities with the largest Hispanic graduate enrollment (2013)

Rank	University	Hispanic enrollment	% of student body
1	Nova Southeastern University	4,281	20%
2	Florida International University	3,612	42%
3	University of Southern California	2,358	11%
4	University of Texas Pan American	2,120	78%
5	University of Texas at El Paso	2,083	59%
6	CUNY Graduate Center	1,656	30%
7	University of New Mexico	1,608	26%
8	University of Texas at San Antonio	1,561	35%
9	University of Florida	1,483	9%
10	Arizona State University	1,400	10%

Hispanic student enrollment in university and college systems (2012–2013)

Rank	University system	Hispanic enrollment	% of student body
1	California Community College System	642,045	41%
2	California State University	149,137	33%
3	Florida College System	118,821	26%
4	University of Texas System	84,086	39%
5	State University System of Florida	79,931	24%
6	City University of New York	77,341	30%
7	State University of New York	43,514	9%
8	University of California	42,604	18%
9	Texas A&M University System	27,165	25%
10	Nevada System of Higher Education	21,467	21%
–	Ivy League	11,562	10%

== List of all institutions ==
Below are institutions of higher education designated as Hispanic-Serving Institutions in the United States based on 2024–25 data from the HACU (Hispanic Association of Colleges and Universities).

Arizona

- Arizona Christian University
- Arizona State University Campus Immersion
- Arizona Western College
- Central Arizona College
- Chandler–Gilbert Community College
- Cochise College
- Eastern Arizona College
- Estrella Mountain Community College
- GateWay Community College
- Glendale Community College
- Justice University
- Mesa Community College
- Mohave Community College
- Northern Arizona University
- Ottawa University-Surprise
- Paradise Valley Community College
- Phoenix College
- Pima Community College
- Rio Salado College
- Scottsdale Community College
- South Mountain Community College
- University of Arizona

Arkansas

- Cossatot Community College
- Northwest Arkansas Community College

California

- Allan Hancock College
- American River College
- Antelope Valley College
- Antioch University-Santa Barbara
- Azusa Pacific University
- Bakersfield College
- Barstow Community College
- Berkeley City College
- Bethesda University
- Butte College
- Cabrillo College
- California Baptist University
- California Lutheran University
- California Polytechnic State University, San Luis Obispo
- California State Polytechnic University, Humboldt
- California State Polytechnic University, Pomona
- California State University, Bakersfield
- California State University, Channel Islands
- California State University, Chico
- California State University, Dominguez Hills
- California State University, East Bay
- California State University, Fresno
- California State University, Fullerton
- California State University, Long Beach
- California State University, Los Angeles
- California State University, Monterey Bay
- California State University, Northridge
- California State University, Sacramento
- California State University, San Bernardino
- California State University, San Marcos
- California State University, Stanislaus
- Cañada College
- Casa Loma College
- CBD College
- Cerritos College
- Cerro Coso Community College
- Chabot College
- Chaffey College
- Citrus College
- City College of San Francisco
- Clovis Community College
- Coalinga College
- Coastline College
- College of Alameda
- College of Marin
- College of San Mateo
- College of the Canyons
- College of the Desert
- College of the Sequoias
- Compton College
- Concordia University Irvine
- Contra Costa College
- Cosumnes River College
- Crafton Hills College
- Cuesta College
- Cuyamaca College
- Cypress College
- DeAnza College
- Diablo Valley College
- Dominican University of California
- East Los Angeles College
- El Camino Community College District
- Evergreen Valley College
- Feather River College
- Foothill College
- Fresno City College
- Fresno Pacific University
- Fullerton College
- Gavilan College
- Glendale Community College
- Golden West College
- Grossmont College
- Hartnell College
- Homestead Schools
- Hope International University
- Humphreys University
- ICOHS College
- Imperial Valley College
- Irvine Valley College
- John Paul the Great Catholic University
- La Sierra University
- Lake Tahoe Community College
- Laney College
- Las Positas College
- Lassen Community College
- Lemoore College
- Life Pacific University
- Loma Linda University
- Long Beach City College
- Los Angeles City College
- Los Angeles County College of Nursing and Allied Health
- Los Angeles Harbor College
- Los Angeles Mission College
- Los Angeles Pacific University
- Los Angeles Pierce College
- Los Angeles Southwest College
- Los Angeles Trade–Technical College
- Los Angeles Valley College
- Los Medanos College
- Loyola Marymount University
- Madera Community College
- Mendocino College
- Menlo College
- Merced College
- Merritt College
- MiraCosta College
- Mission College
- Modesto Junior College
- Monterey Peninsula College
- Moorpark College
- Moreno Valley College
- Mount Saint Mary's University
- Mt. San Antonio College
- Mt. San Jacinto College
- Napa Valley College
- National University
- Norco College
- Oak Valley College
- Ohlone College
- Orange Coast College
- Oxnard College
- Pacific Oaks College
- Pacific Union College
- Palo Verde College
- Palomar College
- Pasadena City College
- Point Loma Nazarene University
- Porterville College
- Reedley College
- Rio Hondo College
- Riverside City College
- Sacramento City College
- Saddleback College
- Saint Mary's College of California
- Samuel Merritt University
- San Bernardino Valley College
- San Diego Christian College
- San Diego City College
- San Diego Mesa College
- San Diego Miramar College
- San Diego State University
- San Francisco State University
- San Joaquin Delta College
- San Jose City College
- San Jose State University
- Santa Ana College
- Santa Barbara City College
- Santa Monica College
- Santa Rosa Junior College
- Santiago Canyon College
- Simpson University
- Skyline College
- Solano Community College
- Sonoma State University
- Southwestern College
- Taft College
- University of California, Davis
- University of California, Irvine
- University of California, Merced
- University of California, Riverside
- University of California, San Diego
- University of California, Santa Barbara
- University of California, Santa Cruz
- University of La Verne
- University of Redlands
- University of San Diego
- University of San Francisco
- University of the Pacific
- Vanguard University
- Ventura College
- Victor Valley College
- West Los Angeles College
- West Valley College
- Whittier College
- William Jessup University
- Woodland Community College
- World Mission University
- Yuba College

Colorado

- Adams State University
- Aims Community College
- Colorado Mountain College
- Colorado State University Pueblo
- Community College of Aurora
- Community College of Denver
- Front Range Community College
- Lamar Community College
- Metropolitan State University of Denver
- Morgan Community College
- Otero College
- Pikes Peak State College
- Pueblo Community College
- Regis University
- Trinidad State College
- University of Colorado Anschutz
- University of Northern Colorado

Connecticut

- Albertus Magnus College
- Connecticut State Community College
- Holy Apostles College and Seminary
- Southern Connecticut State University
- University of Bridgeport
- University of Connecticut-Stamford
- University of Connecticut-Waterbury
- Western Connecticut State University

District of Columbia

- Gallaudet University
- Trinity Washington University

Florida

- AdventHealth University
- Albizu University-Miami
- Ana G. Méndez University
- Barry University
- Broward College
- Florida Atlantic University
- Florida Gulf Coast University
- Florida International University
- Florida Polytechnic University
- Florida SouthWestern State College
- Herzing University-Orlando & Tampa
- Hillsborough Community College
- Indian River State College
- Keiser University
- Lake–Sumter State College
- Miami Dade College
- Nova Southeastern University
- Palm Beach State College
- Pasco–Hernando State College
- Polk State College
- Polytechnic University of Puerto Rico-Miami & Orlando
- SABER College
- Seminole State College of Florida
- South Florida Bible College & Theological Seminary
- South Florida State College
- St. Thomas University
- State College of Florida, Manatee–Sarasota
- Tallahassee State College
- The College of the Florida Keys
- University of Central Florida
- University of Fort Lauderdale
- Valencia College

Georgia

- Beulah Heights University
- Dalton State College
- Georgia Gwinnett College
- Georgia Northwestern Technical College
- Lanier Technical College
- Oglethorpe University

Illinois

- Aurora University
- City Colleges of Chicago–Harold Washington College
- City Colleges of Chicago–Harry S. Truman College
- City Colleges of Chicago–Kennedy–King College
- City Colleges of Chicago–Malcolm X College
- City Colleges of Chicago–Olive–Harvey College
- City Colleges of Chicago–Richard J. Daley College
- City Colleges of Chicago–Wilbur Wright College
- College of DuPage
- College of Lake County
- Columbia College Chicago
- Concordia University Chicago
- Dominican University
- East–West University
- Elgin Community College
- Elmhurst University
- Illinois Institute of Technology
- Joliet Junior College
- Judson University
- Kankakee Community College
- Kishwaukee College
- Lewis University
- McHenry County College
- Moraine Valley Community College
- Morton College
- National Louis University
- North Park University
- Northeastern Illinois University
- Northern Illinois University
- Prairie State College
- Rock Valley College
- Roosevelt University
- Rush University
- Saint Xavier University
- South Suburban College
- The Chicago School
- Triton College
- University of Illinois at Chicago
- University of St. Francis
- VanderCook College of Music
- Waubonsee Community College
- William Rainey Harper College

Indiana

- Calumet College of Saint Joseph
- Goshen College
- Holy Cross College (Indiana)
- Indiana University Northwest
- Purdue University Northwest

Iowa

- Marshalltown Community College

Kansas

- Bethany College (Kansas)
- Dodge City Community College
- Donnelly College
- Flint Hills Technical College
- Garden City Community College
- Kansas City Kansas Community College
- Ottawa University–Online
- Seward County Community College

Maryland

- Montgomery College

Massachusetts

- American International College
- Bay Path University
- Benjamin Franklin Cummings Institute of Technology
- Boston Architectural College
- Bunker Hill Community College
- College of Our Lady of the Elms
- Holyoke Community College
- Massachusetts Bay Community College
- North Shore Community College
- Northern Essex Community College
- Salem State University
- Springfield College–Regional Online and Continuing Education
- Springfield Technical Community College
- Urban College of Boston

Nebraska

- Central Community College
- Union Adventist University
- Western Nebraska Community College

Nevada

- College of Southern Nevada
- Great Basin College
- Nevada State University
- Truckee Meadows Community College
- University of Nevada, Las Vegas
- Western Nevada College

New Jersey

- Atlantic Cape Community College
- Bergen Community College
- Caldwell University
- Camden County College
- County College of Morris
- Essex County College
- Fairleigh Dickinson University
- Felician University
- Hudson County Community College
- Kean University
- Mercer County Community College
- Middlesex College
- Montclair State University
- New Jersey Institute of Technology
- Passaic County Community College
- Pillar College
- Ramapo College of New Jersey
- Rowan College of South Jersey Cumberland Campus
- Rutgers University–Newark
- Saint Elizabeth University
- Saint Peter's University
- Seton Hall University
- UCNJ Union College of Union County NJ
- William Paterson University

New Mexico

- Central New Mexico Community College
- Clovis Community College
- Eastern New Mexico University
- Eastern New Mexico University-Roswell
- Eastern New Mexico University–Ruidoso Branch Community College
- Luna Community College
- Mesalands Community College
- New Mexico Highlands University
- New Mexico Institute of Mining and Technology
- New Mexico Junior College
- New Mexico Military Institute
- New Mexico State University
- New Mexico State University Alamogordo
- New Mexico State University Dona Aña
- New Mexico State University Grants
- Northern New Mexico College
- Santa Fe Community College
- Southeast New Mexico College
- University of New Mexico
- University of New Mexico–Los Alamos
- University of New Mexico-Taos Campus
- University of New Mexico-Valencia County Campus
- University of the Southwest
- Western New Mexico University

New York

- Boricua College
- Cochran School of Nursing
- College of Staten Island CUNY
- CUNY Bernard M Baruch College
- CUNY Borough of Manhattan Community College
- CUNY Bronx Community College
- CUNY City College
- CUNY Graduate School and University Center
- CUNY Hostos Community College
- CUNY Hunter College
- CUNY John Jay College of Criminal Justice
- CUNY Kingsborough Community College
- CUNY LaGuardia Community College
- CUNY Lehman College
- CUNY New York City College of Technology
- CUNY Queens College
- CUNY Queensborough Community College
- CUNY Stella and Charles Guttman Community College
- Dominican University New York
- Dutchess Community College
- Farmingdale State College
- Iona University
- Manhattan University
- Manhattanville University
- Mercy University
- Metropolitan College of New York
- Montefiore School of Nursing
- Mount Saint Mary College
- Nassau Community College
- Rockland Community College
- St. Francis College
- Suffolk County Community College
- Sullivan County Community College
- SUNY at Purchase College
- SUNY Old Westbury
- SUNY Westchester Community College
- University of Mount Saint Vincent
- Vaughn College of Aeronautics and Technology

North Carolina

- Central Carolina Community College
- James Sprunt Community College
- Sampson Community College

Oklahoma

- Randall University

Oregon

- Blue Mountain Community College
- Chemeketa Community College
- Columbia Gorge Community College
- Tillamook Bay Community College
- Warner Pacific University
- Western Oregon University

Pennsylvania

- ASPIRA City College
- Lehigh Carbon Community College
- Luzerne County Community College
- Northampton County Area Community College
- Penn State Hazleton
- Reading Area Community College

Puerto Rico

- Adventist University of the Antilles
- Albizu University
- Ana G. Méndez University
- Atenas University
- Atlantic University (Puerto Rico)
- Bayamón Central University
- Caribbean University
- Colegio Universitario de San Juan
- Conservatory of Music of Puerto Rico
- Dewey University
- EDP University of Puerto Rico–Hato Rey
- EDP University of Puerto Rico–San Sebastian
- Escuela de Artes Plásticas y Diseño de Puerto Rico
- Humacao Community College
- Instituto Tecnologico de Puerto Rico
- Interamerican University of Puerto Rico
- Interamerican University of Puerto Rico, Metropolitan Campus
- Interamerican University of Puerto Rico at Ponce
- Interamerican University of Puerto Rico School of Law
- Interamerican University of Puerto Rico, School of Optometry
- Polytechnic University of Puerto Rico
- Ponce Health Sciences University
- Pontifical Catholic University of Puerto Rico
- Pontifical Catholic University of Puerto Rico at Mayagüez
- San Juan Bautista School of Medicine
- Universal Technology College of Puerto Rico
- Universidad Central del Caribe
- Universidad del Sagrado Corazon
- University of Puerto Rico at Aguadilla
- University of Puerto Rico at Bayamón
- University of Puerto Rico at Carolina
- University of Puerto Rico at Cayey
- University of Puerto Rico at Humacao
- University of Puerto Rico at Mayagüez
- University of Puerto Rico, Medical Sciences Campus
- University of Puerto Rico at Ponce
- University of Puerto Rico, Río Piedras Campus

Rhode Island

- College Unbound
- Rhode Island College

Tennessee

- Southern Adventist University

Texas

- Alvin Community College
- Amarillo College
- Angelina College
- Angelo State University
- Arlington Baptist University
- Austin College
- Austin Community College District
- Baptist University of the Americas
- Brazosport College
- Central Texas College
- Cisco College
- Clarendon College
- Coastal Bend College
- College of Biblical Studies
- College of the Mainland
- Concordia University Texas
- Dallas Christian College
- Dallas College
- Del Mar College
- East Texas A&M University
- El Paso Community College
- Frank Phillips College
- Galveston College
- Hallmark University
- Hardin–Simmons University
- Hill College
- Houston Christian University
- Houston Community College
- Howard College
- Howard Payne University
- Jacksonville College
- Kilgore College
- Lamar State College–Port Arthur
- Laredo College
- Lee College
- Lone Star College System
- Lubbock Christian University
- McLennan Community College
- McMurry University
- Midland College
- Midwestern State University
- Navarro College
- Nelson University
- North Central Texas College
- Northeast Lakeview College
- Northeast Texas Community College
- Northwest Vista College
- Odessa College
- Our Lady of the Lake University
- Palo Alto College
- Ranger College
- Remington College–Houston
- Sam Houston State University
- San Antonio College
- San Jacinto Community College
- Schreiner University
- South Plains College
- South Texas College
- Southwest College for the Deaf
- Southwest Texas Junior College
- Southwestern Adventist University
- Southwestern University
- St. Edward's University
- St. Mary's University
- St. Philip's College (United States)
- Sul Ross State University
- Tarrant County College
- Temple College
- Texas A&M International University
- Texas A&M University
- Texas A&M University–Corpus Christi
- Texas A&M University–Kingsville
- Texas A&M University–Central Texas
- Texas A&M University–San Antonio
- Texas A&M University–Victoria
- Texas Lutheran University
- Texas Southmost College
- Texas State Technical College
- Texas State University
- Texas Tech University
- Texas Tech University Health Sciences Center
- Texas Tech University Health Sciences Center El Paso
- Texas Wesleyan University
- Texas Woman's University
- Trinity University
- Trinity Valley Community College
- Tyler Junior College
- University of Dallas
- University of Houston
- University of Houston–Clear Lake
- University of Houston–Downtown
- University of Mary Hardin–Baylor
- University of North Texas
- University of North Texas at Dallas
- University of St. Thomas
- University of Texas at Arlington
- University of Texas at Austin
- University of Texas at El Paso
- University of Texas at San Antonio
- University of Texas at Tyler
- University of Texas Health Science Center at Houston
- University of Texas MD Anderson Cancer Center
- University of Texas Medical Branch at Galveston
- University of Texas Permian Basin
- University of Texas Rio Grande Valley
- University of the Incarnate Word
- Vernon College
- Victoria College
- Wayland Baptist University
- West Texas A&M University
- Western Texas College
- Wharton County Junior College

Virginia

- Marymount University
- Northern Virginia Community College

Washington

- Big Bend Community College
- City University of Seattle
- Columbia Basin College
- Heritage University
- Pacific Northwest Christian College
- Perry Technical Institute
- Skagit Valley College
- Walla Walla Community College
- Wenatchee Valley College
- Yakima Valley College

West Virginia

- Catholic International University

Wisconsin

- Alverno College
- Gateway Technical College
- Herzing University–Kenosha
- Mount Mary University

== See also ==
- Historically black colleges and universities
- Colegio Cesar Chavez
- Higher Education Act of 1965
