= List of college athletic programs in Arizona =

This is a list of college athletic programs in the U.S. state of Arizona.

== NCAA ==
=== Division I ===
Full NCAA Division I Members in Arizona
– FBS Football, – FCS Football, – No Football

Team	School	City	Conference	Sport sponsorship								
Team	School	City	Conference	Foot- ball	Basketball		Base- ball	Soft- ball	Ice hockey		Soccer	
Team	School	City	Conference	Foot- ball	M	W	Base- ball	Soft- ball	M	W	M	W
Arizona Wildcats	University of Arizona	Tucson	Big 12	FBS	Yes	Yes	Yes	Yes	No	No	No	Yes
Arizona State Sun Devils	Arizona State University	Tempe	Big 12	FBS	Yes	Yes	Yes	Yes	Yes (Note: Arizona State's ice hockey team competes as a member of the National Collegiate Hockey Conference.)	No	No	Yes
Grand Canyon Antelopes	Grand Canyon University	Phoenix	MW	No	Yes	Yes	Yes	Yes	No	No	Yes	Yes
Northern Arizona Lumberjacks	Northern Arizona University	Flagstaff	Big Sky	FCS	Yes	Yes	No	No	No	No	No	Yes

== NAIA ==
Full NAIA Members in Arizona
– Football, – Non-Football

Team	School	City	Conference	Sport sponsorship						
Team	School	City	Conference	Foot- ball	Basketball		Base- ball	Soft- ball	Soccer	
Team	School	City	Conference	Foot- ball	M	W	Base- ball	Soft- ball	M	W
Arizona Christian Firestorm	Arizona Christian University	Glendale	Great Southwest	Yes (Note: Arizona Christian's football team competes in the Frontier Conference.)	Yes	Yes	Yes	Yes	Yes	Yes
Benedictine Redhawks	Benedictine University at Mesa	Mesa	Great Southwest	No	Yes	Yes	Yes	Yes	Yes	Yes
Embry-Riddle Eagles	Embry-Riddle Aeronautical University, Prescott	Prescott	Great Southwest	No	Yes	Yes	Yes	Yes	Yes	Yes
Ottawa Spirit	Ottawa University Arizona	Surprise	Great Southwest	Yes (Note: Ottawa's football team competes in the Sooner Athletic Conference.)	Yes	Yes	Yes	Yes	Yes	Yes
Park Buccaneers	Park University Gilbert	Gilbert	Great Southwest	No	Yes	Yes	Yes	Yes	Yes	Yes

== NJCAA ==
Team	School	City	Conference
Arizona Western Matadors	Arizona Western College	Yuma	Arizona CC
Central Arizona Vaqueros	Central Arizona College	Coolidge	Arizona CC
Chandler-Gilbert Coyotes	Chandler-Gilbert Community College	Chandler	Arizona CC
Cochise Apaches	Cochise College	Douglas	Arizona CC
Eastern Arizona Gila Monsters	Eastern Arizona College	Thatcher	Arizona CC
Estrella Mountain Mountain Lions	Estrella Mountain Community College	Avondale	Arizona CC
GateWay Geckos	GateWay Community College	Phoenix	Arizona CC
Glendale Gauchos	Glendale Community College	Glendale	Arizona CC
Mesa Thunderbirds	Mesa Community College	Mesa	Arizona CC
Paradise Valley Pumas	Paradise Valley Community College	Phoenix	Arizona CC
Phoenix Bears	Phoenix College	Phoenix	Arizona CC
Pima Aztecs	Pima Community College	Tucson	Arizona CC
Scottsdale Fighting Artichokes	Scottsdale Community College	Scottsdale	Arizona CC
South Mountain Cougars	South Mountain Community College	Phoenix	Arizona CC
Tohono O'odham Jegos	Tohono O'odham Community College	Pima City	Arizona CC
Yavapai Roughriders	Yavapai College	Prescott	Arizona CC

== Others ==
Team	School	City	Association
Diné Warriors	Diné College	Tsaile	USCAA
Justice Lions	Justice University	Chandler	NCCAA
Nelson American Indian Warriors	Nelson American Indian College	Phoenix	NCCAA

== See also ==
- List of NCAA Division I institutions
- List of NCAA Division II institutions
- List of NCAA Division III institutions
- List of NAIA institutions
- List of USCAA institutions
- List of NCCAA institutions
- List of NJCAA Division I institutions
- List of NJCAA Division II institutions
- List of NJCAA Division III institutions
