= List of Psi Beta chapters =

Psi Beta is an honor society for psychology students at two-year colleges. Following is a list of Psi Beta chapters.

Chapter	Charter date	Location	Status	Ref.
Golden West College	April 18, 1981	Huntington Beach, California	Inactive	(Note: Chapter was a Psi Beta charter member.)
McLennan Community College	May 5, 1981	Waco, Texas	Active	
Cerritos College	May 30, 1981	Norwalk, California	Active	
Prince George's Community College	August 5, 1981	Upper Marlboro, Maryland	Inactive	
Cottey College	1981	Nevada, Missouri	Inactive	(Note: Now a four-year college.)
Des Moines Area Community College	1981	Ankeny, Iowa	Inactive	
Gateway Community College	1981	New Haven, Connecticut	Inactive	(Note: Chapter was chartered at South Central Community College, now Gateway Community College.)
Lincoln Train College	1981	Robinson, Illinois	Inactive	
Mountain View College	1981	Dallas, Texas	Inactive	
Piedmont Technical College	1981	Greenwood, South Carolina	Inactive	
St. Phillip's College	1981	San Antonio, Texas	Inactive	
Orange Coast College	February 10, 1982	Costa Mesa, California	Active	
Community College of Allegheny County	April 28, 1982	Pittsburgh, Pennsylvania	Active	
Northern Essex Community College	February 15, 1983	Haverhill, Massachusetts	Inactive	
Los Angeles City College	April 1, 1983	Los Angeles, California	Active	
College of DuPage	April 29, 1983	Glen Ellyn, Illinois	Active	
Cypress College	June 16, 1983	Cypress, California	Active	
Ohio University – Zanesville	January 2, 1985	Zanesville, Ohio	Inactive	
Middlesex County College	March 7, 1985	Edison, New Jersey	Inactive	
Black Hawk College	April 30, 1985	Moline, Illinois	Active	
Sinclair Community College	January 3, 1986	Dayton, Ohio	Active	
Quinsigamond Community College	April 24, 1986	Worcester, Massachusetts	Active	
LaGuardia Community College	May 12, 1986	Long Island City, New York	Inactive	
Mohawk Valley Community College	June 15, 1986	Utica, New York	Inactive	
Tri-County Technical College	July 1, 1986	Pendleton, South Carolina	Active	
Collin College	September 2, 1986	Plano, Texas	Active	
County College of Morris	April 1, 1987	Randolph, New Jersey	Inactive	
Northeast Texas Community College	May 1, 1987	Mount Pleasant, Texas	Active	
Alfred State College	October 1, 1987	Alfred, New York	Active	
Polk State College	October 7, 1987	Winter Haven, Florida	Inactive	(Note: Chapter formed at Polk Community College which became Polk State College in 2009 when it began offering Bachelor's degrees.)
Spartanburg Methodist College	September 1, 1998	Spartanburg, South Carolina	Active	
Grand Rapids Community College	February 1, 1989	Grand Rapids, Michigan	Active	
Community College of Allegheny County - South	April 9, 1989	West Mifflin, Pennsylvania	Active	
Houston Community College	April 28, 1989	Houston, Texas	Active	
Mesa Community College	May 10, 1989	Mesa, Arizona	Active	
Massachusetts Bay Community College	January 1, 1990	Wellesley, Massachusetts	Active	
Nassau Community College	January 23, 1990	East Garden City, New York	Active	
Temple College	May 1, 1990	Temple, Texas	Active	
San Diego Mesa College	November 1, 1990	San Diego, California	Active	
Union County College	April 19, 1991	Cranford, New Jersey	Active	
Waubonsee Community College	May 9, 1991	Sugar Grove, Illinois	Active	
Community College of Rhode Island	December 6, 1991	Warwick, Rhode Island	Active	
Palomar College	June 5, 1992	Pala, California	Active	
Irvine Valley College	December 18, 1992	Irvine, California	Active	
Central Texas College	January 22, 1993	Killeen, Texas	Active	
Lake Michigan College	May 19, 1993	Benton Harbor, Michigan	Inactive	
Southwestern College	June 5, 1993	Chula Vista, California	Active	
Camden County College	November 22, 1993	Gloucester Township, New Jersey	Active	
Parkland College	December 8, 1993	Champaign, Illinois	Active	
Owens Community College	May 13, 1994	Perrysburg, Ohio	Active	
Georgia Highlands College	May 15, 1994	Cartersville, Georgia	Inactive	
Tulsa Community College	September 9, 1994	Tulsa, Oklahoma	Active	
Blinn College	March 2, 1995	Bryan, Texas	Active	
Atlantic Cape Community College	April 13, 1995	Mays Landing, New Jersey	Active	
Mineral Area College	November 21, 1995	Park Hills, Missouri	Inactive	
Seminole State College	January 24, 1996	Seminole, Oklahoma	Active	
Anoka-Ramsey Community College	June 6, 1996	Coon Rapids, Minnesota	Inactive	
Housatonic Community College	May 20, 1997	Bridgeport, Connecticut	Inactive	
Oklahoma City Community College	November 4, 1997	Oklahoma City, Oklahoma	Active	
Hinds Community College	April 16, 1998	Raymond, Mississippi	Inactive	
Pasco–Hernando State College West	October 23, 1998	New Port Richey, Florida	Active	(Note: Chapter formed at Pasco Hernando Community College, now Pasco-Hernando State College West.)
Glendale Community College	November 2, 1998	Glendale, Arizona	Active	
Palm Beach State College	December 5, 1998	Palm Beach Gardens, Florida	Active	
Carroll Community College	December 10, 1998	Westminster, Maryland	Inactive	
Saddleback College	April 30, 1999	Mission Viejo, California	Active	
Dallas College North Lake	November 6, 1999	Irving, Texas	Active	
Anne Arundel Community College	April 27, 2000	Anne Arundel County, Maryland	Active	
Las Positas College	May 5, 2000	Livermore, California	Active	
Pasadena City College	May 9, 2000	Pasadena, California	Active	
North Idaho College	May 11, 2000	Coeur d'Alene, Idaho	Inactive	
John A. Logan College	July 22, 2000	Carterville, Illinois	Inactive	
Mt. San Antonio College	May 9, 2001	Walnut, California	Inactive	
Hudson County Community College	June 1, 2001	Jersey City, New Jersey	Inactive	
Luzerne County Community College	June 6, 2001	Nanticoke, Pennsylvania	Active	
Pasco-Hernando State College East	September 25, 2001	Dade City, Florida	Active	
Brookdale Community College	March 27, 2002	Lincroft, New Jersey	Active	
Coastal Alabama Community College - Brewton Campus	May 3, 2002	Brewton, Alabama	Inactive	(Note: Chapter was chartered at Jefferson Davis Community College which consolidated with Coastal Alabama Community College.)
College of the Canyons	May 4, 2002	Santa Clarita, California	Active	
Front Range Community College Larimer Campus	May 22, 2002	Fort Collins, Colorado	Inactive	
Central Lakes College	November 13, 2002	Brainerd, Minnesota	Inactive	
Santa Ana College	December 6, 2002	Santa Ana, California	Active	
Northampton Community College	December 5, 2003	Tannersville, Pennsylvania	Active	
Queensborough Community College	February 5, 2005	Bayside, New York	Active	
Northern Virginia Community College, Annandale	April 15, 2005	Annandale, Virginia	Active	
American River College	May 6, 2005	Sacramento, California	Active	
Lehigh Carbon Community College	May 10, 2005	Schnecksville, Pennsylvania	Active	
San Juan College	January 26, 2006	Farmington, New Mexico	Active	
Coastline Community College	April 4, 2006	Fountain Valley, California	Inactive	
Sussex County Community College	May 17, 2007	Newton, New Jersey	Active	
Holyoke Community College	September 14, 2007	Holyoke, Massachusetts	Active	
West Virginia University at Parkersburg	December 13, 2007	Parkersburg, West Virginia	Active	
Community College of Denver	February 8, 2008	Denver, Colorado	Active	
Estrella Mountain Community College	February 28, 2008	Avondale, Arizona	Active	
Lone Star College–Montgomery	April 15, 2008	Conroe, Texas	Active	
Citrus College	May 20, 2008	Glendora, California	Inactive	
Pasco–Hernando State College North	February 28, 2009	Brooksville, Florida	Active	
Central Piedmont Community College	April 24, 2009	Charlotte, North Carolina	Active	
Virginia Western Community College	May 12, 2009	Roanoke, Virginia	Active	
Miami Dade College Kendall Campus	September 24, 2009	Miami, Florida	Active	
Suffolk County Community College Ammerman Campus	October 15, 2009	Seldon, New York	Inactive	
Tarrant County College Northeast Campus	March 3, 2010	Hurst, Texas	Active	
Shelton State Community College	April 12, 2010	Tuscaloosa, Alabama	Active	
Bellevue College	May 26, 2010	Bellevue, Washington	Active	
San Diego City College	September 23, 2010	San Diego, California	Active	
San Antonio College	January 20, 2011	San Antonio, Texas	Active	
Pasco–Hernando State College Spring Hill	April 6, 2011	Spring Hill, Florida	Active	
Miami Dade College North Campus	April 6, 2011	Miami, Florida	Inactive	
South Texas College	July 8, 2011	McAllen, Texas	Active	
Pensacola State College	September 17, 2011	Pensacola, Florida	Inactive	(Note: Chapter formed at Pensacola Junior College, now Pensacola State College.)
Lorain County Community College	December 6, 2011	Elyria, Ohio	Active	
Owensboro Community and Technical College	January 25, 2012	Owensboro, Kentucky	Inactive	
Cuyamaca College	March 16, 2012	El Cajon, California	Active	
Salt Lake Community College	March 16, 2012	Salt Lake City, Utah	Active	
Henry Ford Community College	April 12, 2012	Dearborn, Michigan	Inactive	
North Central State College	May 11, 2012	Mansfield, Ohio	Active	
Prairie State College	November 12, 2012	Chicago Heights, Illinois	Inactive	
McHenry County College	April 5, 2013	Crystal Lake, Illinois	Active	
Casper College	May 5, 2013	Casper, Wyoming	Active	
Southwest Tennessee Community College	June 4, 2013	Memphis, Tennessee	Active	
Foothill College	June 27, 2013	Los Altos Hills, California	Active	
Bergen Community College	August 24, 2013	Paramus, New Jersey	Active	
Cochise College	February 11, 2014	Sierra Vista, Arizona	Inactive	
College of San Mateo	February 11, 2014	San Mateo, California	Inactive	
College of Southern Nevada	February 11, 2014	Las Vegas, Nevada	Active	
Eastern Florida State College	March 11, 2014	Palm Bay, Florida	Inactive	
Lone Star College–University Park	March 11, 2014	Houston, Texas	Inactive	
Columbia Basin College	April 3, 2014	Pasco, Washington	Inactive	
Pasco–Hernando State College Porter	April 7, 2014	Wesley Chapel, Florida	Active	
Folsom Lake College	April 12, 2014	Folsom, California	Inactive	
Reading Area Community College	April 23, 2014	Reading, Pennsylvania	Inactive	
El Paso Community College	April 23, 2014	El Paso, Texas	Inactive	
John Wood Community College	May 13, 2014	Quincy, Illinois	Inactive	
Odessa College	July 9, 2015	Odessa, Texas	Inactive	
College of Western Idaho	October 6, 2014	Nampa, Idaho	Active	
Santa Monica College	October 6, 2014	Santa Monica, California	Inactive	
Northwest Vista College	October 23, 2014	San Antonio, Texas	Active	
Stark State College	November 4, 2014	North Canton, Ohio	Active	
Hillsborough Community College	December 12, 2014	Tampa, Florida	Active	
Helena College University of Montana	January 17, 2015	Helena, Montana	Inactive	
Florida Keys Community College	March 16, 2015	Key West, Florida	Inactive	
Motlow State Community College	April 21, 2015	Tullahoma, Tennessee	Active	
Lone Star College–North Harris	December 7, 2015	Houston, Texas	Active	
Highline College	March 22, 2016	Des Moines, Washington	Inactive	
Broward College	March 30, 2016	Davie, Florida	Active	
Central New Mexico Community College	May 9, 2016	Albuquerque, New Mexico	Active	
Allegany College of Maryland	June 16, 2016	Cumberland, Maryland	Inactive	
Yuba College	July 7, 2016	Marysville, California	Active	
St. Petersburg College	September 1, 2016	St. Petersburg, Florida	Active	
Tarrant County College	November 18, 2016	Fort Worth, Texas	Inactive	(Note: Chapter formed at Tarrant County Junior College, now Tarrant County College.)
Mott Community College	November 21, 2016	Flint, Michigan	Active	
Walters State Community College	December 14, 2016	Morristown, Tennessee	Active	
Harford Community College	January 30, 2017	Bel Air, Maryland	Active	
Cabrillo College	February 24, 2017	Aptos, California	Active	
Spokane Community College	February 24, 2017	Spokane, Washington	Inactive	
Trinidad State Junior College	March 18, 2017	Trinidad, Colorado	Inactive	
Sierra College	August 21, 2017	Rocklin, California	Active	
Gaston College	September 14, 2017	Dallas, North Carolina	Active	
San Diego Miramar College	September 18, 2017	San Diego, California	Active	
East Los Angeles College	November 7, 2017	Monterey Park, California	Active	
Hartnell College	November 16, 2017	Salinas, California	Inactive	
Paradise Valley Community College	December 7, 2017	Phoenix, Arizona	Active	
Schenectady County Community College	January 20, 2018	Schenectady, New York	Inactive	
Motlow State Community College Smyrna	January 31, 2018	Smyrna, Tennessee	Active	
L. E. Fletcher Technical Community College	February 13, 2018	Schriever, Louisiana	Inactive	
Pitt Community College	February 13, 2018	Greenville, North Carolina	Inactive	
Southwestern Michigan College	February 13, 2018	Dowagiac, Michigan	Active	
Rowan College of South Jersey	March 12, 2018	Sewell, New Jersey	Active	
Chandler–Gilbert Community College	March 12, 2018	Chandler, Arizona	Active	
Lakeland Community College	March 21, 2018	Kirtland, Ohio	Inactive	
Inver Hills Community College	April 2, 2018	Inver Grove Heights, Minnesota	Active	
Coastal Carolina Community College	April 2, 2018	Jacksonville, North Carolina	Active	
Mt. San Jacinto College	April 9, 2018	San Jacinto, California	Inactive	
Jackson College	May 8, 2018	Jackson, Michigan	Inactive	
Ocean County College	May 8, 2018	Toms River, New Jersey	Active	
Rose State College	June 5, 2018	Midwest City, Oklahoma	Active	
Alvin Community College	February 18, 2019	Alvin, Texas	Active	
Miami Dade College West Campus	March 11, 2019	Miami, Florida	Active	
Bakersfield College	October 9, 2019	Bakersfield, California	Active	
Montgomery County Community College	October 30, 2019	Blue Bell, Pennsylvania	Active	
Community College of Philadelphia	November 14, 2019	Philadelphia, Pennsylvania	Active	
Lansing Community College	December 23, 2019	Lansing, Michigan	Active	
Skyline College	February 11, 2020	San Bruno, California	Active	
Kennebec Valley Community College	January 6, 2021	Fairfield and Hinckley, Maine	Active	
Massasoit Community College	May 17, 2021	Brockton, Massachusetts	Active	
El Camino College	July 19, 2021	Torrance, California	Active	
Nashville State Community College	July 19, 2021	Nashville, Tennessee	Active	
Miami Dade College Padron Campus	November 24, 2021	Miami, Florida	Active	
Westmoreland County Community College	December 9, 2021	Youngwood, Pennsylvania	Active	
Santa Barbara City College	February 2, 2022	Santa Barbara, California	Active	
Los Angeles Pierce College	May 16, 2022	Woodland Hills, California	Active	
Wenatchee Valley College	May 16, 2022	Wenatchee, Washington	Active	
Rockland Community College	July 19, 2022	Suffern, New York	Active	
Ivy Tech Community College of Indiana Lake County Campus	July 28, 2022	Gary, Indiana	Active	
Ivy Tech Community College of Indiana Bloomington	September 8, 2022	Bloomington, Indiana	Active	
Brazosport College	October 24, 2022	Lake Jackson, Texas	Active	
Central Oregon Community College	November 19, 2022	Bend, Oregon	Active	
Alfred State College	November 19, 2022	Yucaipa, California	Active	
Butte College	December 26, 2022	Oroville, California	Active	
Cuyahoga Community College	April 25, 2023	Parma, Ohio	Active	
Chaffey College	May 6, 2023	Rancho Cucamonga, California	Active	
Midlands Technical College	June 7, 2023	Columbia, South Carolina	Active	
Kansas City Kansas Community College	June 27, 2023	Kansas City, Kansas	Active	
Columbia–Greene Community College	November 1, 2023	Hudson, New York	Active	
Ashland Community College		Ashland, Kentucky	Inactive	
Barton County Community College		Great Bend, Kansas	Inactive	
Baltimore City Community College		Baltimore, Maryland	Inactive	
Bismarck State College		Bismarck, North Dakota	Inactive	
Black Hawk College East Campus		Kewanee, Illinois	Inactive	
Brevard Community College		Cocoa, Florida	Inactive	
Briarwood College		Southington, Connecticut	Inactive	
Brookhaven College		Farmers Branch, Texas	Inactive	
Carteret Community College		Morehead City, North Carolina	Inactive	
Central Florida Community College		Ocala, Florida	Inactive	
Chabot College		Hayward, California	Inactive	
Charles County Community College		La Plata, Maryland	Inactive	
Chattanooga State Technical Community College		Chattanooga, Tennessee	Inactive	
Clover Park Technical College		Lakewood, Washington	Inactive	
College of Alameda		Alameda, California	Inactive	
Community College of Baltimore County Essex Campus		Essex, Maryland	Inactive	
Compton Community College		Compton, California	Inactive	
Del Mar College		Corpus Christi, Texas	Inactive	
Delgado Community College		New Orleans, Louisiana	Inactive	
Edison Community College		Fort Myers, Florida	Inactive	
Fairleigh Dickinson University		Teaneck, New Jersey	Inactive	
Faulkner State Community College		Bay Minette, Alabama	Inactive	
Floyd College		Rome, Georgia	Inactive	
Fullerton College		Fullerton, California	Inactive	
Gadsden State Community College		Gadsden, Alabama	Inactive	
Georgia Perimeter College		Dunwoody, Georgia	Inactive	
Guilford Technical Community College		Jamestown, North Carolina	Inactive	
Harry S. Truman College		Chicago, Illinois	Inactive	
Highland Community College		Highland, Kansas	Inactive	
Hill College		Hillsboro, Texas	Inactive	
Holy Cross College		Notre Dame, Indiana	Inactive	
Hostos Community College		Bronx, New York	Inactive	
Hudson Valley Community College		Troy, New York	Inactive	
Illinois Valley Community College		Oglesby, Illinois	Inactive	
Imperial Valley College		Imperial, California	Inactive	
J. Sargeant Reynolds Community College		Richmond, Virginia	Inactive	
Jefferson State Community College		Birmingham, Alabama	Inactive	
Jefferson Community College		Louisville, Kentucky	Inactive	
Johnson County Community College		Overland Park, Kansas	Inactive	
Joliet Junior College		Joliet, Illinois	Inactive	
Kankakee Community College		Kankakee, Illinois	Inactive	
Lane Community College		Eugene, Oregon	Inactive	
Laramie County Community College		Cheyenne, Wyoming	Inactive	
Lee College		Baytown, Texas	Inactive	
Lincoln Trail College		Robinson, Illinois	Inactive	
Lord Fairfax Community College Fauquier Campus		Warrenton, Virginia	Inactive	
Manatee Community College South Campus		Venice, Florida	Inactive	
Manchester Community Technical College		Manchester, Connecticut	Inactive	
Marshalltown Community College		Marshalltown, Iowa	Inactive	
Mercer County Community College		Trenton, New Jersey	Inactive	
Miami-Dade Community College Wolfson Campus		Miami, Florida	Inactive	
Miami University Hamilton		Hamilton, Ohio	Inactive	
Midland College		Midland, Texas	Inactive	
Miles Community College		Miles City, Montana	Inactive	
Minneapolis Community and Technical College		Minneapolis, Minnesota	Inactive	
Mitchell College		New London, Connecticut	Inactive	
Napa Valley College		Napa, California	Inactive	
Navarro College		Corsicana, Texas	Inactive	
Northeastern Technical College		Cheraw, South Carolina	Inactive	
Normandale Community College		Bloomington, Minnesota	Inactive	
North Harris County College		Houston, Texas	Inactive	
Oakton Community College		Des Plaines, Illinois	Inactive	
Oxnard College		Oxnard, California	Inactive	
Portland Community College		Portland, Oregon	Inactive	
Raritan Valley Community College		Somerville, New Jersey	Inactive	
Raymond Walters College		Cincinnati, Ohio	Inactive	
Rend Lake College		Ina, Illinois	Inactive	
Riverside Community College		Riverside, California	Inactive	
Rochester Christian University		Rochester Hills, Michigan	Inactive	
St. Louis Community College–Meramec		Kirkwood, Missouri	Inactive	
St. Louis Community College–Florissant Valley		St. Louis, Missouri	Inactive	
St. Philip's College		San Antonio, Texas	Inactive	
San Bernardino Valley College		San Bernardino, California	Inactive	
San Jacinto College South		Houston, Texas	Inactive	
Santiago Canyon College		Orange, California	Inactive	
Schoolcraft College		Livonia, Michigan	Inactive	
Scottsdale Community College		Scottsdale, Arizona	Inactive	
Somerset Community College		Somerset, Kentucky	Inactive	
South Plains College		Levelland, Texas	Inactive	
Southeastern Illinois College		Harrisburg, Illinois	Inactive	
Southwestern Illinois College		Belleville, Illinois	Inactive	
Surry Community College		Dobson, North Carolina	Inactive	
Tacoma Community College		Tacoma, Washington	Inactive	
Texas State Technical College		Waco, Texas	Inactive	
Tulsa Community College Metro Campus		Tulsa, Oklahoma	Inactive	
Tulsa Community College Northeast Campus		Tulsa, Oklahoma	Inactive	
Tulsa Community College Southeast Campus		Tulsa, Oklahoma	Inactive	
Truckee Meadows Community College		Reno, Nevada	Inactive	
Tunxis Community Technical College		Farmington, Connecticut	Inactive	
Ulster County Community College		Stone Ridge, New York	Inactive	
University of South Carolina Salkehatchie		Walterboro, South Carolina	Inactive	
Utah Valley University		Orem, Utah	Inactive	
Vincennes University		Vincennes, Indiana	Inactive	
Weatherford College		Weatherford, Texas	Inactive	
West Valley College		Saratoga, California	Inactive	
Western Nevada College		Carson City, Nevada	Inactive	
Western Oklahoma State College		Altus, Oklahoma	Inactive	
Western Texas College		Snyder, Texas	Inactive	
Windward Community College		Kaneohe, Hawaii	Inactive	
