= KJZZ (FM) =

Public radio station in Phoenix

Coordinates: 33.3328°N 112.0654°W

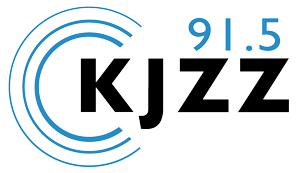
- Phoenix, Arizona; United States
- Frequency: 91.5 MHz (HD Radio)
- Branding: KJZZ 91.5

Programming
- Format: News/talk (public)
- Subchannels: HD2: Jazz "Jazz PHX"
- Affiliations: NPR, PRX, American Public Media

Ownership
- Owner: Rio Salado College; (Maricopa County Community College District)
- Sister stations: KBAQ

History
- First air date: February 25, 1951 (as KFCA at 88.5)
- Former call signs: KFCA (1951–1972); KMCR (1972–1985)
- Former frequencies: 88.5 MHz (1951-66)
- Call sign meaning: "Jazz"

Technical information
- Licensing authority: FCC
- Facility ID: 40095
- Class: C
- ERP: 100,000 watts
- HAAT: 490 meters (1,610 ft)
- Translator: see below

Links
- Public license information: Public file; LMS
- Webcast: Listen Live; Listen Live (HD2)
- Website: kjzz.org jazz.kjzz.org (HD2)

KJZZ (91.5 FM) is a National Public Radio member station in Phoenix, Arizona. Owned by Rio Salado College, it operates from studios inside the C Building on the college's campus on West 14th Street in Tempe. KJZZ airs a format of NPR, and blues and airs jazz on its HD2 subchannel. KJZZ is sister station to the area's main classical music station, KBAQ.

== History ==
The station signed on February 22, 1951, broadcasting from the campus of Phoenix College, then an arm of the Phoenix Union High School District, as KFCA. It was Phoenix's first FM radio station, broadcasting with 10 watts on 88.5 MHz. It became a part of the Maricopa County Junior College District, and then the Maricopa County Community College District when the district was formed in 1962. The station moved to 91.5 MHz in 1966. In 1971, KFCA joined NPR and was approved for a power increase to 100,000 watts with a new tower on South Mountain. On August 24, 1972, soon after signing on from its new, stronger tower, the station changed its calls to KMCR-FM for "Maricopa County Radio". In 1985, the call letters were changed to KJZZ to reflect the jazz music programming that it featured. Within a few years, the station was transferred to the umbrella of Rio Salado College, also in the Maricopa County Community College District, as part of a district reorganization. KJZZ was considered a good fit for Rio Salado College's mission; Rio Salado was conceived as a "campus without walls" and serves as the umbrella for all classes and other academic activities not specifically offered at one of the district's physical campuses.

KJZZ produces several programs, including a weekly call-in talk show, Here and Now, hosted by Phoenix journalist Steve Goldstein which includes calls and e-mails from listeners, not to be confused by the national NPR program of the same name.

In the Spring of 2008, the station produced The Aaron Brown Show, a pilot program hosted by former CNN news anchor Aaron Brown.

Also heard on KJZZ (as well as several other public radio stations in the southwest and Texas) are unique news stories under its program entitled Fronteras: The Changing America Desk. This entity is one of seven Local Journalism Centers (LJCs) created by the Corporation for Public Broadcasting (CPB) to pool the resources of public media stations across the country in FY2009. These LJCs hire their own reporters and editors and concentrate on a specific area. Fronteras represents the Southwest LJC and focuses primarily on cultural and demographic shifts in the southwest U.S. and stories began airing in 2010. Other topics heard on Fronteras include immigration and the U.S./Mexico border. According to the CPB, Fronteras' Southwest LJC and the remaining LJCs were expected to become self-sufficient after 2 years.

KJZZ moved the remaining jazz programming from its main signal in April 2024 to its HD2 subchannel, leaving the main program as an all-talk format. The only music programming left on the main signal is a Sunday night 6 to 11pm blues show.

== HD Radio ==
KJZZ's HD Radio signal is multiplexed.

- HD1 is a digital simulcast of KJZZ's public radio programming.
- HD2 airs jazz.

== Translators ==
Broadcast translators for KJZZ
Call sign	Frequency	City of license	FID	ERP (W)	Class	FCC info
K295AL	106.9 FM	Little Acres, Arizona	72511	15	D	LMS
K219DZ	91.7 FM	Rio Verde, Arizona	92006	10	D	LMS
K255AC	98.9 FM	Tucson, Arizona	40097	10	D	LMS
K221EK	92.1 FM	Silver City, New Mexico	142306	10	D	LMS
