= KBAQ =

Classical music public radio station in Phoenix

- Phoenix, Arizona; United States
- Frequency: 89.5 FM (HD Radio)
- Branding: K-Bach

Programming
- Format: Classical
- Subchannels: HD2: Radio Bilingüe; HD3: Sun Sounds of Arizona

Ownership
- Owner: Maricopa County Community College District and Arizona State University
- Sister stations: KJZZ, KAET

History
- First air date: April 26, 1993
- Call sign meaning: "BAQ" sounds like Bach

Technical information
- Licensing authority: FCC
- Facility ID: 40096
- Class: C1
- ERP: 30,000 watts
- HAAT: 474 meters (1,555 ft)
- Transmitter coordinates: 33.333°N 112.065°W
- Translator: 89.7 K209DV (Scottsdale)
- Repeater: KAET channel 8.5, Phoenix

Links
- Public license information: Public file; LMS
- Webcast: Listen live
- Website: kbaq.org

KBAQ (89.5 FM, "K-Bach") is a public radio station in Phoenix, Arizona, United States, playing classical music. It is co-owned by the Maricopa County Community College District (MCCCD) and Arizona State University (ASU). The studios are located inside the C Building on MCCCD's campus of Rio Salado College on West 14th Street in Tempe, alongside MCCCD-owned KJZZ (91.5 FM), while the station broadcasts from a transmitter on South Mountain. In addition to its FM signal, it is broadcast as an audio subchannel (8.5) of ASU-owned KAET television (Arizona PBS) across central, northern, and southwestern Arizona.

The need for a public classical music station in Phoenix arose in 1986 when commercial station KONC was sold and changed formats. MCCCD and ASU each filed for the available 89.5 MHz frequency, which in turn was also sought by three other applicants. In 1990, the Federal Communications Commission ordered the two parties to share time on the frequency or otherwise come to an agreement. With the collaboration of both educational institutions, KBAQ began broadcasting on April 26, 1993; the community college system manages day-to-day operations, while ASU provides production and recording services for concerts around Arizona. The station is funded by donations from listeners, the Corporation for Public Broadcasting, and the community college district.

== History ==
Phoenix's longtime classical music station had been KONC at 101.5 MHz. On March 31, 1986, that station left the classical format. In July, another commercial radio station stepped into the format, a station at 106.3 which adopted the KONC call sign; Tucson's KUAT-FM also established a translator in Phoenix on 105.5 MHz. This service moved to 89.5 MHz in 1989 to accommodate a power upgrade for 105.3 MHz in Wickenburg.

Nearly immediately after KONC switched formats, the Maricopa County Community College District (MCCCD), owner of public jazz and talk station KJZZ, launched a bid for a non-commercial classical music station at 89.5 MHz and filed an application with the Federal Communications Commission (FCC). However, a week later, Arizona State University (ASU) put in a bid for 89.5 as well. The move angered MCCCD officials; not only did ASU propose to use taxpayer money, but it forced MCCCD into comparative hearings. KJZZ's station director said, "If ASU had desired to do something to impede the progress in returning classical music to the airwaves in Phoenix, it couldn't have found a better action to pursue." MCCCD had already raised some $80,000 to build a classical station but halted its fundraising drive when ASU entered the fray. In addition, the owner of the former KONC at 101.5 donated the station's music library to KJZZ.

In 1988, the two classical applications were designated for a consolidated hearing alongside those of Sun Health Corporation, Western Broadcasting Corporation, and Radio Alliance Phoenix. Over the course of 1989, Western and Radio Alliance Phoenix withdrew. On June 26, 1990, the FCC denied the Sun Health application in favor of the MCCCD and ASU bids. The FCC ordered MCCCD and ASU to share time on the 89.5 frequency and stipulated a time-share plan in the event the two parties could not agree. Both parties recognized that alternating days of broadcasting would be an unworkable arrangement. The two sides came to an agreement in which they would jointly own the station. The studios would be with KJZZ, while facilities at ASU could be used to record performances.

=== Sign-on ===
KBAQ—"K-Bach"—began broadcasting from atop South Mountain on April 26, 1993, with an effective radiated power of just 91 watts, effectively limiting its coverage to Phoenix itself and its innermost suburbs.

In 1998, KBAQ was relocated to the White Tank Mountains north and west of Phoenix, which permitted an increase in effective radiated power to 12,500 watts. However, some areas were shaded from the signal, notably affluent parts of Scottsdale containing many station supporters. Translators were later installed on South Mountain and in Scottsdale to improve coverage.

In 2009, KBAQ was approved to return to South Mountain with an effective radiated power of 30,000 watts.

== Funding ==
In fiscal year 2022, KBAQ had combined operating and nonoperating revenues of $3.21 million, with the largest share coming from more than $1.07 million in private gifts. This represented 20 percent of the total revenue generated by KJZZ and KBAQ.

== Programming ==
The broadcast schedule consists primarily of playlists announced by local hosts, as well as the nationally syndicated program Sunday Baroque from WSHU-FM in Connecticut. Local specialty programs on the schedule include the Mozart Buffet (featuring music of Wolfgang Amadeus Mozart and his contemporaries) and Reel Music, consisting of orchestral scores for film.

Central Sound at Arizona PBS, formerly the KBAQ production unit, provides concert recording services to KBAQ and other stations as well as audio support for Arizona PBS itself. Central Sound produces Arizona Encore, a weekly series of concerts recorded at locations throughout central and northern Arizona, which airs on KBAQ and KNAU in Flagstaff.

== Translators ==
Call sign	Frequency	City of license	FID	ERP (W)	Class	FCC info
K209DV	89.7 FM	Scottsdale, Arizona	91869	10	D	LMS
