= KJZZ =

KJZZ may refer to:

- KJZZ (FM), a radio station (91.5 FM) licensed to Phoenix, Arizona, United States
- KJZZ-TV, a television station (channel 19, virtual 14) licensed to Salt Lake City, Utah, United States
