= CCUSD =

CCUSD may refer to:

- Culver City Unified School District, a school district in California
- Cave Creek Unified School District, a school district in Arizona

== See also ==
- CSUSD
