= Cactus Shadows High School =

Location
- 5802 E. Dove Valley Rd. Scottsdale, Arizona 85266; United States

Information
- School type: Public High School
- Established: 1982
- School district: Cave Creek USD
- Principal: Heather Isom
- Teaching staff: 72.41 (FTE)
- Grades: 9-12
- Enrollment: 1,566 (2023–2024)
- Student to teacher ratio: 21.63
- Campus type: Suburban/closed campus
- Colors: Navy; Gray; White
- Mascot: Falcon
- Newspaper: CS Press
- Website: Website

Cactus Shadows High School is a public high school located in Cave Creek, Arizona. It is the only high school in the Cave Creek Unified School District.

In 1974 the first committee met in Cave Creek to form a high school. In the fall of 1982, the doors opened to the first campus located at 60th Street with grades 7-9. (This campus is currently Black Mountain Elementary School.) The first graduating class was in 1986. In January 1995, Cactus Shadows High School opened in its current location at 5802 E. Dove Valley Rd. In the summer of 1999, the second phase of building the campus was completed. In 2006 six classrooms were occupied at the former Black Mountain Elementary School, now called Cactus Shadows East Campus. In 2009, landscaping projects including grass, adding additional trees and fencing for security purposes were completed. The district is building 38,000 new square feet of classroom space at Cactus Shadows and an expanded cafeteria, as well as repainting the school and upgrading its numerous systems.

== Athletics ==
Cactus Shadows athletics compete at the Division II level and is a member of the Arizona Interscholastic Association. Programs provided include:

- Boys Golf (Fall)
- Girls Golf (Fall)
- Cross Country (Fall)
- Swim and Dive (Fall)
- Football (Fall)
- Girls Volleyball (Fall)
- Hockey (Fall)
- Mountain Biking (Fall)
- Boys Basketball (Winter)
- Girls Basketball (Winter)
- Boys Soccer (Winter)
- Girls Soccer (Winter)
- Wrestling (Winter)
- Baseball (Winter) (Spring)
- Softball (Spring)
- Boys Tennis (Spring)
- Girls Tennis (Spring)
- Track and Field (Spring)
- Girls Beach Volleyball (Spring)
- Boys Volleyball (Spring)
- Cheer (All Year)
- Pom (All Year)
- Unified Sports (Cheer/ Track & Field)

Cactus Shadows Cheer is the current 2014 USA National Champions in the Super Varsity Show Cheer Advanced Division. The All Girl Stunt Group took 2nd Place in the 2014 Nationals. The All Girl Stunt Group are the 2011 USA National Champions! They are the reigning 8 time AIA Division II Varsity Cheer State Champions (2006-2007-2008-2009-2010-2011-2013-2014) and Spiritline Overall Champions (2006-2007-2008-2009-2011-2013-2014), and the 7 time AZ State Cheer Varsity Champions.

Cactus Shadows Football was the 4A Division II State Champion in 2006

Cactus Shadows Boys Tennis was the 4A Division II State Champion in 2006 and 2007

Cactus Shadows Baseball was the 4A Division II State Champion in 2006

== Cactus Shadows Nest ==
The Cactus Shadows Nest is the student section at Cactus Shadows. Among basketball student sections, Cactus Shadows was ranked 7th best in Arizona by AZCentral in 2014, and the only division II school in the rankings. The Nest is known for their annual Silent Night game.

== Notable alumni ==
- Abraham Hamadeh, Class of 2009, United States Congressman.
- Michael T. Liburdi, Class of 1995, U.S. District Court Judge
- Taylor Lewan, Class of 2009, Professional Football Player for the Tennessee Titans (transferred to Chaparral High School)
- Jaron Long, Class of 2010, Baseball Player
- Lauren Lazo, Class of 2011, Professional Soccer Player
- Kiowa Gordon, Actor

== Performing Arts ==
Cactus Shadows High School has multiple performing arts clubs including Drama Club and Band. Performances take place at the venue Cactus Shadows Fine Arts Center. The facility includes multiple performance spaces, notably a 430 seat proscenium theater. Community arts groups also utilize the space for performances, such as Desert Foothills Theater.
