= KAET =

Television station in Phoenix, Arizona

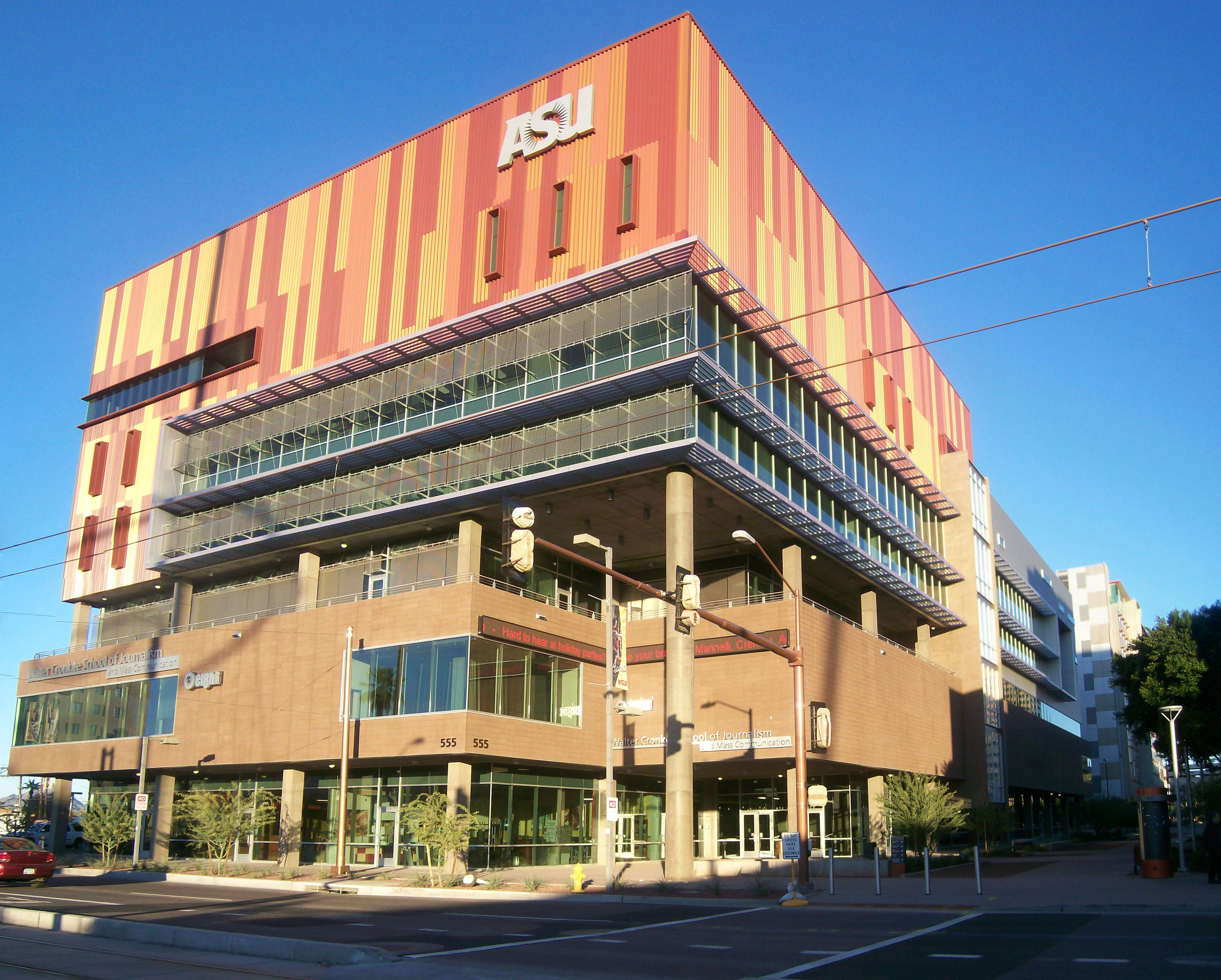
- The KAET studios at the Cronkite School building on ASU's downtown Phoenix campus
- Phoenix, Arizona; United States
- Channels: Digital: 8 (VHF); Virtual: 8
- Branding: Arizona PBS

Programming
- Affiliations: 8.1: PBS; for others, see § Subchannels

Ownership
- Owner: Arizona State University; (Arizona Board of Regents for Arizona State University)
- Sister stations: KBAQ

History
- First air date: January 30, 1961
- Former channel numbers: Analog: 8 (VHF, 1961–2009); Digital: 29 (UHF, 2001–2009)
- Former affiliations: NET (1961–1970)
- Call sign meaning: Arizona Educational Television

Technical information
- Licensing authority: FCC
- Facility ID: 2728
- ERP: 52.9 kW
- HAAT: 552 m (1,811 ft)
- Transmitter coordinates: 33°19′58.8″N 112°3′51.4″W
- Translator(s): see § Translators

Links
- Public license information: Public file; LMS
- Website: www.azpbs.org

KAET (channel 8), known as Arizona PBS, is a PBS member television station in Phoenix, Arizona, United States, owned by Arizona State University (ASU). It operates from a building shared with the Walter Cronkite School of Journalism and Mass Communication on ASU's Downtown Phoenix campus, and its transmitter is located on South Mountain on the south side of Phoenix. Its signal is relayed across central, northern, and southwestern Arizona on a network of 13 translator stations.

== History ==
In late 1959, as it was preparing to build new facilities for itself, Phoenix commercial television station KVAR offered to sell its old transmitter on South Mountain, valued at $150,000, to ASU for $30,000. The offer jumpstarted plans to build an educational television station in Phoenix and prompted the Arizona Board of Regents to authorize expenditures for the transmitter and additional equipment in January 1960.

On November 8, 1960, the Federal Communications Commission granted the construction permit to ASU. Having found that the call letters KASU was already in use at Arkansas State University, the call letters KAET was selected, for "Arizona Educational Television". The station began broadcasting January 30, 1961, with a series of telecourses as well as programming from National Educational Television; the station's first local production was a Spanish 101 course. By 1966, KAET broadcast 50 hours a week of programs. It converted to color, first with network shows, with a grant for a color broadcast chain in 1967; the station's lobbying for color conversion was aided when the staff delivered a color television set to university president G. Homer Durham. In 1973, KAET moved from its original home in the Engineering Center to another location on the Tempe campus, the newly built Stauffer Hall communications building.

Statewide expansion began in 1980 when translators on Mount Francis and Mingus Mountain, followed the next year by another on Mount Elden, were activated. The decade also saw the establishment of Horizon, the station's flagship public affairs show, in 1981; the world's first broadcast of open heart surgery in 1983; and the station's wall-to-wall telecast of the Evan Mecham impeachment hearings in 1988. Sister radio station KBAQ signed on in 1993.

In June 1999, KAET was issued a permit to construct digital television facilities on UHF channel 29. KAET-DT went on the air in April 2001 and was licensed on June 12, 2001, becoming the fifth licensed digital television station in the state.

During the late-2000s recession, fundraising efforts at KAET fell behind projections, resulting in two major rounds of layoffs. The first round came in late October 2008, when the station, having missed its fundraising targets by hundreds of thousands of dollars, had to lay off six workers. The second round of layoffs came in April 2009, when 13 employees were let go. The financial crisis also delayed KAET's move from its longtime home on the Tempe campus to its new headquarters in downtown Phoenix; the move was completed at the end of 2009.

Known for years as "Channel 8", the station began using "Arizona PBS" as a secondary brand in 2005. In 2006, KAET relaunched as "Eight, Arizona PBS" (stylized as "ei8ht" in logos); this brand was dropped in 2015 in favor of simply "Arizona PBS".

In 2014, operation of Arizona PBS was transferred from the ASU public affairs office to the Cronkite School itself. During this time, KAET aired Cronkite News, a student-produced newscast, on its main channel. In 2019, the Cronkite School became home to the western bureau for the PBS News Hour. Cronkite students worked with PBS News Hour staff at the bureau, which provided updates and digital media coverage. Stephanie Sy, a News Hour correspondent, anchored the western updates.

In 2020, the roles of dean of the Cronkite School and president of Arizona PBS were split; Arizona PBS itself was separated from the Cronkite School in 2022 and moved under ASU's Media Enterprise. The next year, the broadcast of Cronkite News was moved to KAET's 8.2 subchannel. Following Congressional rescission of federal funding for public broadcasting in 2025, PBS News Hour West was discontinued when ASU opted not to renew its contract. However, sources affiliated with ASU claimed that it was PBS's decision to shut the program down in the middle of the school year and not continue it through June 2026.

== Programming ==
KAET produces several of its programs in-house, such as its current events program Arizona Horizon, its Hispanic-focused current events counterpart Horizonte, and its Arizona Collection documentaries about the people, places and history of the state. The Emmy Award-winning Over Arizona, produced in 1995 with KCTS Seattle, is an aerial adventure over Arizona's diverse landscapes and was the first high-definition television program produced by an Arizona broadcast entity.

== Technical information ==
=== Subchannels ===
The station's signal is multiplexed:

Subchannels of KAET
Subchannel	Res.	Short name	Programming
8.1	1080i	AZ PBS	PBS
8.2	1080i	Life	Arizona PBS Life
8.3	480i	World	World
8.4	480i	AZ KIDS	PBS Kids
8.5	1080i	KBAQ	Dolby Digital 5.1 simulcast of KBAQ

=== Analog-to-digital conversion ===
KAET's digital signal has been on the air since 2001, originally operating on UHF channel 29, and presently carries four subchannels under the Arizona PBS Digital Broadcasting brand. The station shut down its analog signal, over VHF channel 8, on April 29, 2009. The station's digital signal relocated from its pre-transition UHF channel 29 to VHF channel 8.

=== Translators ===
- K03IL-D Bullhead City
- K30OI-D Camp Verde
- K35MU-D Cottonwood, etc.
- K14KK-D Flagstaff
- K31NV-D Globe–Miami
- K33OD-D Kingman
- K31GZ-D Lake Havasu City
- K36FZ-D Meadview
- K20ML-D Parks, etc.
- K23NJ-D Prescott, etc.
- K35PR-D Show Low
- K27NR-D Topock
- K19CX-D Yuma
