= Jaron Long =

American baseball player (born 1991)

- Pitcher
- Born: August 28, 1991 (age 35); Scottsdale, Arizona
- Bats: Right Throws: Right
- Stats at Baseball Reference

Jaron Long (born August 28, 1991) is an American former professional baseball pitcher. Prior to playing professionally, Long played college baseball for Chandler-Gilbert Community College and Ohio State University.

== Amateur career ==
Long attended Cactus Shadows High School in Cave Creek, Arizona. He played baseball as a pitcher and an infielder, but did not make his school's varsity team until he was a senior. In 2010, The Arizona Republic named Long as an honorable mention on their All-Class 4A baseball team. No colleges in the National Collegiate Athletic Association's Division I offered him a scholarship. After he graduated, Long enrolled at Chandler–Gilbert Community College, and played college baseball for the Chandler–Gilbert Coyotes. As a freshman, Long pitched to a 1.62 earned run average (ERA) in 50 innings, though a broken wrist ended his season prematurely. After he recovered, he participated in collegiate summer baseball, playing for the East Texas Pumpjacks of the Texas Collegiate League.

After his freshman year, he transferred to Ohio State University to play for the Ohio State Buckeyes baseball team, a Division I program. Long began his Buckeyes career as a relief pitcher, but was moved into the starting rotation. As a sophomore, Long led the Buckeyes with a 2.66 ERA, the sixth-best ERA among pitchers in the Big Ten Conference, and the fourth most innings pitched. Long was named to the All-Big Ten's first team. That summer, he played for the Bourne Braves of the Cape Cod Baseball League. In his junior year, Long developed warts on his pitching hand, which prevented him from throwing his changeup. He had a 4.02 ERA, and went undrafted in the 2013 MLB draft. Pitching again for the Bourne Braves in the summer of 2013, he was named a league All-Star and his 0.30 ERA led the league.

== Professional career ==
=== New York Yankees ===
New York Yankees' amateur scouting director Damon Oppenheimer noticed Long and, in August 2013, Long signed with the Yankees as an undrafted free agent. He then appeared in six games as a relief pitcher with the Gulf Coast Yankees of the Rookie-level Gulf Coast League and Tampa Yankees of the High–A Florida State League at the end of the 2013 season.

In 2014, he was assigned to the Charleston RiverDogs of the Single–A South Atlantic League. In 11 appearances, including four games started, Long had a 1.64 ERA for Charleston. For the week of May 26 – June 1, he was named the league's Pitcher of the Week. On June 5, he was promoted to Tampa. After six appearances for Tampa, in which he compiled a 2.77 ERA, he was promoted to the Trenton Thunder of the Double–A Eastern League. Overall, Long pitched in 28 games (18 starts) and had a 12–5 record, 2.18 ERA, 122 strikeouts, 22 walks, and a shutout in 144 1/3 innings pitched.

Long started the 2015 season with the Scranton/Wilkes-Barre RailRiders of the Triple–A International League. He pitched to a 4.94 ERA in 85 2/3 innings before being demoted back to Trenton in July. Long finished the season there with a 3.39 ERA in 69 innings. He pitched in the Venezuelan Winter League in the offseason. The Yankees released Long in April 2016 at the end of spring training.

=== Washington Nationals ===
On April 22, 2016, Long signed a minor league contract with the Washington Nationals. He spent the 2016 season pitching for the Double–A Harrisburg Senators and Triple–A Syracuse Chiefs. He finished the 2016 season with a 5–6 record and a 3.20 ERA. He spent the 2017 season between Double-A and Triple-A, pitching to a 3.61 ERA in 164.1 innings. Long elected free agency following the season on November 6, 2017.

On November 27, 2017, Long re-signed a minor league deal with the Nationals and received an invite to spring training. He spent the year with Double–A Harrisburg, also making two appearances with Syracuse. In 25 games (19 starts) for Harrisburg, Long compiled a 6–8 record and 3.65 ERA with 77 strikeouts across 123 1/3 innings pitched. He elected free agency following the season on November 2, 2018.

=== Arizona Diamondbacks ===
On December 14, 2018, Long signed a minor league deal with the Arizona Diamondbacks. He was released on March 21, 2019.

== Certified Player Agent ==
Following the end of his playing career, Long became a certified player agent, first working for Boras Corp then joining VaynerSports in March 2022.

== Personal life ==
Long is the youngest of three children. His father, Kevin Long, is the current hitting coach of the Philadelphia Phillies and former hitting coach of the Washington Nationals, New York Yankees and New York Mets. Kevin, who then was playing and coaching in the minor leagues, insisted that his son not pitch while he was young or throw a breaking ball until he was 16 years old. As a teenager, Long served as a batboy for the Yankees.

Long returned to Ohio State to graduate in December 2013.
