= Little Acres, Arizona =

- Populated place
- Location within the state of Arizona Little Acres (the United States)
- Coordinates: 33°23′41″N 110°49′15″W
- Country: United States
- State: Arizona
- County: Gila
- Elevation: 3,402 ft (1,037 m)
- Time zone: UTC-7 (Mountain (MST))
  - Summer (DST): UTC-7 (MST)
- Area code: 928
- FIPS code: 04-41400
- GNIS feature ID: 31025

Little Acres is a populated place situated in Gila County, Arizona, United States. It has an estimated elevation of 3,402 feet (1,037 m) above sea level.
