= Cave Creek Unified School District =

School district in Arizona, United States

Address
- 33016 North 60th Street Scottsdale, Arizona, 85266; United States
- Coordinates: 33.786085°N 111.953312°W

District information
- Type: Public
- Grades: PreK–12
- NCES District ID: 0400001

Students and staff
- Students: 4,837
- Teachers: 270.1
- Staff: 331.4
- Student–teacher ratio: 17.91

Other information
- Website: www.ccusd93.org

The Cave Creek Unified School District is the school district serving Cave Creek and Carefree, Arizona, as well as the northern portion of Scottsdale and a sliver of eastern Phoenix. It operates one high school (Cactus Shadows High School), one middle school (Sonoran Trails), and three elementary schools (Black Mountain Elementary School, Horseshoe Trails Elementary School and Desert Willow Elementary School). A second middle school, Desert Arroyo, was closed in May 2010.

== Standardized testing ==
Horseshoe Trails tested with the highest scores in the ELA portion and the math portion. Desert Sun got the least score out of the elementary schools in both portions. Cactus Shadows got the least score on both portions out of all of the schools.
