= South Mountain Community College =

Public college in Phoenix, Arizona, US

- Other name: SMCC
- Type: Public community college
- Established: 1978; 48 years ago
- Parent institution: Maricopa County Community College District
- Accreditation: HLC
- President: Veronica Hipolito
- Students: 8,000+
- Location: Phoenix, Arizona, United States; 33°22′57″N 112°01′59″W
- Campus: Urban
- Branches: Guadalupe
- Colors: orange and black
- Nickname: Cougars
- Sporting affiliations: National Junior College Athletic Association; Arizona Community College Athletic Conference
- Website: www.southmountaincc.edu

South Mountain Community College is a public community college in Phoenix, Arizona. It is one of the ten colleges in the Maricopa County Community College District.

== History ==
South Mountain Community College was established by the governing board of the Maricopa County Community College District on April 18, 1978. The campus was designed by local architect Bennie Gonzales, opening its doors in 1980. Serving Phoenix, Ahwatukee, Guadalupe and Laveen, South Mountain Community College offers associate degrees, certificates of completion, courses that transfer to universities and technology training to 7,500 students each year. The college takes its name from South Mountain, which is a few kilometers to the south of campus. The main campus is in Phoenix, Arizona, with additional locations in Guadalupe and Laveen. South Mountain Community College is accredited by the Higher Learning Commission and is a Hispanic Serving Institution.

== Northern Arizona University at South Mountain Community College ==
Northern Arizona University (NAU) and South Mountain Community College (SMCC) collaborate to allow students to complete their bachelor's degree on the SMCC campus after finishing their associate degree. NAU maintains a building on the SMCC campus and offers bachelor's degree programs.

== Notable alumni ==
- Chris Duffy
- Cody Ransom

== See also ==
- List of colleges and universities in Arizona
