= Paradise Valley Community College =

Public college in Phoenix, Arizona, US

- Former name: Northeast Valley Education Center
- Type: Public community college
- Established: 1985; 41 years ago
- Parent institution: Maricopa County Community College District
- Affiliations: Higher Learning Commission; North Central Association of Colleges and Schools
- President: Jana Schwartz
- Students: 14,000+
- Location: Phoenix, Arizona, U.S. 33°39′10″N 112°00′37″W
- Campus: Urban
- Branches: Scottsdale
- Colors: Royal blue & sand
- Nickname: Pumas
- Sporting affiliations: National Junior College Athletic Association
- Mascot: Paws the Puma
- Website: www.paradisevalley.edu

Paradise Valley Community College (PVCC) is a public community college in Phoenix, Arizona. A branch campus, PVCC at Black Mountain, opened in 1985, with classes temporarily held at Paradise Valley High School. Once construction was completed in 1987, classes were held at its current location in what was then the far northern section of Scottsdale, Arizona, to serve this rapidly growing area. It provides greater access for the communities of Cave Creek and Carefree.

The college mascot is the puma and the colors are royal blue and white.

== History ==
PVCC was founded by the Maricopa County Community College District as the Northeast Valley Education Center in 1985 with classes temporarily held at Paradise Valley High School. The district gave the college its present name and began campus construction in 1986. The campus was designed by Lescher & Mahoney. The permanent site was inaugurated on May 2, 1987. Since then, PVCC has expanded in both campus size and enrollment along with the development of the Phoenix area.

In 1989 PVCC began offering Chemistry courses. The college operated as an extension of Scottsdale Community College and gained independent accreditation in 1990. The first graduation official ceremony was held on May 10, 1991. In 1997 ground was broken for construction of the M-Building.

The campus also has a Learning Resource Center building which houses the library, computer labs, and tutoring center. Several art collections, such as the over 600 Western-themed pieces donated by faculty-emeritus member Dr. Warren Buxton in 1990, are on display near the college's library.

The PVCC Center for the Performing Arts, containing stage facilities for drama and music performances, opened in 2005.

In 2007 the L-Building was built to house classes for Nursing, Fire Science and EMT. The building was built using a modular construction system.

In 2007 PVCC acquired the adjacent George L. Campbell Branch Library. The building underwent a major renovation and opened in 2011 as the Q-Building which is home of the Mathematics Department.

A new building for the study of life sciences (anatomy, physiology, general biology, biotechnology, microbiology, marine biology and environmental biology programs) opened at the main campus in August 2009. It includes seven classrooms, six biology labs and two anatomy/physiology labs, one of which is a cadaver lab, plus lab support spaces and administrative offices.

In 2009 the Black Mountain satellite campus opened, which serves residents of near by Cave Creak and Carefree.

In 2011 The PVCC Library was renamed The Jo and Warren Buxton Library.

In 2012 a Heath Sciences building was added to the main campus.

The Kranitz Student Center re-opened in 2013 after a major renovation and expansion of the building.

== Athletics ==
Athletics at PVCC is affiliated with the National Junior College Athletic Association (NJCAA). PVCC offers 12 intercollegiate athletics programs; men's & women's soccer, men's & women's cross country, baseball, softball, men's & women's indoor/outdoor track and field, men's & women's golf, and men's & women's tennis. PVCC athletics mascot is the Pumas.

The Pumas boast 12 NJCAA National Championships. Women's soccer - 2016, 2012, 2010 Men's cross country - 2022, 2011, 2008, 2004 Women's cross county - 2004, 2003, 2002, 1998, 1997

The Pumas are also extremely strong in the classroom. PVCC has been home to multiple NJCAA Academic Team of the Year awards and dozens of NJCAA Academic Award individuals.

Athletic facilities include: baseball and softball fields, track facility, soccer game field and soccer practice field, tennis courts, athletics training room and athletics offices. All athletics facilities are located toward the south side of campus.

== Transportation ==
The college is a short distance west of State Route 51 and south of the Loop 101 interchange.

Valley Metro buses from routes 16, 39 and 186 serve the campus. For many years, the campus was served by express route 500, but in 2003, this service was canceled and replaced with the RAPID service that departs from Bell Road and State Route 51 Park-and-Ride.
