= GateWay Community College =

College in Phoenix, Arizona, US

Gateway Community College
- Other name: GWCC
- Motto: Education that works, so you learn more, live better.
- Type: Community College
- Established: 1968; 58 years ago
- Parent institution: Maricopa County Community College District
- Academic affiliations: Higher Learning Commission; North Central Association of Colleges and Schools
- President: Amy Diaz
- Students: 12,000
- Location: Phoenix, Arizona, U.S. 33°26′57″N 111°59′43″W
- Campus: Urban
- Colors: Blue, grey, black
- Nickname: Geckos
- Sporting affiliations: Arizona Community College Athletic Conference; National Junior College Athletic Association
- Website: www.gatewaycc.edu

GateWay Community College is a community college in Phoenix, Arizona. Established in 1968, GateWay is one of ten regionally accredited colleges in the Maricopa County Community College District. The Maricopa Skill Center was rebranded as the Trade and Technical Training Division of GateWay in 2016, offering many of the same programs, just under a new division name within GateWay Community College.

GateWay is the only Maricopa Community College with a Valley Metro Rail stop on campus, located on the south end of the campus.

GateWay Early College High School is located on the GWCC campus. Students can be enrolled in college classes and earn credits to eventually earn an associate degree. The first GWECHS class graduated in May, 2008. The GWECHS received its NCA accreditation on April 1, 1997.

== History ==
GateWay was originally located in downtown Phoenix, named Maricopa Technical College, which became the first technical college to be established in Arizona. On May 1, 1987, Maricopa Tech became GateWay Community College, adopting the name commonly used to describe the surrounding area. The Automotive Center was added to the campus in 1989, followed by the Children's Learning Center and Central Plant in 1998, and Center for Health Careers Education in 1999.

GateWay Community College received its NCA accreditation on July 30, 1971.

== Academics ==
GateWay Community College offers more than 160 degree and certificate options.

== Athletics ==
GateWay has the following competitive sports:

- Men's Baseball
- Men's Soccer
- Women's Soccer
- Women's Softball
