= Maricopa County Community College District =

Community college district in Tempe, Arizona, U.S.

Coordinates: 33°30′50″N 112°28′33″W

- Type: Public community college district
- Established: 1962; 64 years ago
- Accreditation: Higher Learning Commission (HLC)
- Chancellor: Steven Gonzales
- Students: 102,761
- Colors: Navy Blue and Black
- Website: www.maricopa.edu

Maricopa County Community College District Headquarters building in Tempe, Arizona August 2026

The Maricopa County Community College District (MCCCD), also known as Maricopa Community Colleges, is a public community college district in Maricopa County, Arizona, United States. Headquartered in Tempe, MCCCD is among the largest community college districts in the United States, serving more than 100,000 students each year in the Phoenix metropolitan area.

The programs offered at MCCCD include those leading to a two-year associate degree and occupational certificates, as well as online classes and dual enrollment programs. The cost of tuition for Maricopa County residents is $97 per credit hour, as of the 2025–26 academic year.

== History ==
The Phoenix Union High School District established Phoenix Junior College (now Phoenix College) in 1920 as the first community college in the state of Arizona. In 1960, the state legislature provided for junior college districts in Arizona. The Maricopa County Junior College District was established in 1962 by the approval of county voters, with the new system acquiring Phoenix Junior College.

The system established branch campuses of Phoenix Junior College in the nearby suburbs of Glendale and Mesa; these would subsequently become independent campuses within the system.

- Maricopa County Junior College Northwest Campus (now Glendale Community College) in 1965;
- Maricopa County Junior College Southeast Campus (now Mesa Community College) in 1965.

Other campuses were established in the following years:

- Maricopa Technical College (now part of GateWay Community College) in 1968;
- Scottsdale Community College in 1969;
- Rio Salado Community College in 1978;
- South Mountain Community College in 1980;
- the Northeast Valley Education Center (now Paradise Valley Community College) in 1985;
- the Chandler/Gilbert Education Center (now Chandler-Gilbert Community College) in 1985;
- Estrella Mountain Community College in 1990;
- Southwest Skill Center (now part of GateWay Community College) in 2000;
- the Red Mountain campus part of Mesa Community College in 2001;
- Glendale Community College North in 2008;
- Paradise Valley Community College at Black Mountain in 2009.

In 1971, the "Junior College" portion of the name was changed to "Community College".

The State Board of Directors for Community Colleges of Arizona presided over the entire statewide community college system until June 2002, when the Arizona Legislature reduced its powers and duties and transferred most oversight to individual community college districts.

In 2010, the various nursing programs at each of the Maricopa Community Colleges coalesced under one standard curriculum and program consortium: "MaricopaNursing.

In September 2016, the Maricopa Skill Center which has three campuses including Buckeye & 12th St, 29th Ave & Bell, and 75th Ave & Peoria were folded into the Gateway Community College brand. The merger of brands was due in part by "shrinking appropriations from the state since 2007, [requiring] more aggressive, intentional actions have taken place to bring the two institutions more in line with one another".

In March 2017, MCCCD moved from a standardized, stepped-compensation system for its staff to a range-based system based on performance. The new system was slated for implementation in July 2017.

In Feb 2018, the MCCCD governing board eliminated the meet-and-confer program which was used as a form of bargaining for employee benefits and compensation, among other purposes. This change resulted in controversy among some MCCCD staff and faculty.

In Feb 2018, football ceased to be a funded sport at the MCCCD colleges due to lack of available budget. Four months later, a human resources project to harmonize the technology behind the way staff are paid was reported to have resulted in thousands of underpay-overpay errors over the course of 6 months. This problem resulted in a unanimous vote of no-confidence by the faculty senate at each of the MCCCD colleges.

In Feb 2025, in compliance with new guidelines from the U.S. Department of Education, the college stopped funding affinity groups related to diversity, equity, and inclusion. As a result, the largest LGBTQ+ student organization on campus disbanded.

== Colleges ==
| College | City | Mascot | Established | Enrollment (Fall 2020) |
|---|---|---|---|---|
| Chandler-Gilbert Community College | Chandler | Cody the Coyote | 1985 | 13,395 |
| Estrella Mountain Community College | Avondale | Roary the Mountain Lion | 1990 | 8,768 |
| GateWay Community College | Phoenix | Geckos | 1968 | 4,670 |
| Glendale Community College | Glendale | Gauchos | 1965 | 14,374 |
| Mesa Community College | Mesa | Thor the Thunderbird | 1965 | 16,948 |
| Paradise Valley Community College | Phoenix | Pumas | 1985 | 6,575 |
| Phoenix College | Phoenix | Bumstead the Bear | 1920 | 9,538 |
| Rio Salado College | Tempe | Rio Waves/Splash | 1978 | 17,362 |
| Scottsdale Community College | Scottsdale | Artie the Artichoke | 1969 | 7,634 |
| South Mountain Community College | Phoenix | Cougars | 1980 | 3,497 |
| Total: | | | | 102,761 |

== Maricopa Corporate College ==
Founded in 2013, the corporate college provides consultative services to businesses, and continuing education to professionals, and will oversee district entrepreneurial activities and initiatives, such as the business incubator on the GateWay Community College campus. It functions independently of the 10 Maricopa community colleges and two skill centers, while drawing on their faculty and facility resources when appropriate.

== Center for Entrepreneurial Innovation (CEI) ==
The Center for Entrepreneurial Innovation constitutes a partnership among the City of Phoenix, the Economic Development Administration and the Maricopa County Community College District, as well as additional public and private partners.

== Governance and leadership ==
The district is governed by a governing board, president, chancellor, and provost. The Governing Board of the Maricopa County Community College District has seven members, five elected from geographical districts within the Maricopa County, and two elected at-large positions by the voters of the entire county. The Chancellor of the Maricopa Community Colleges is the CEO of the 10-college system. The presidents at each college and 4 vice chancellors report to the Chancellor, who serves at the pleasure of the Governing Board.

== Lectureships ==
Honors Forum Lectures: The Honors Forum Lecture Series features local and nationally known speakers who address specific issues related to a theme selected by Phi Theta Kappa. The Phi Theta Kappa (PTK) theme is chosen to bring unity to the Honors Program and the national PTK chapters at each college.

Fischl Lecture Series at Phoenix College: The Eric Fischl Lecture Series was launched in 2005 when American painter and sculpture Eric Fischl returned to Phoenix College for the first time since the late 1960s. Fischl, then student, studied at PC under renowned Southwestern landscape artist and faculty member Merrill Mahaffey.

== Name confusion ==
The Maricopa Community College District, or Maricopa Community Colleges for short, is also known as the Maricopa County Community College District (MCCCD). This is the legal entity name of the district. Some confuse the Maricopa Community Colleges abbreviation for Mesa Community College (MCC), one of the ten Maricopa colleges. The district's official initialism, therefore, is MCCCD, while Mesa's is MCC.
