= Estrella Mountain Community College =

Public college in Avondale, Arizona, US

- Other names: EMCC
- Type: Public community college
- Established: 1992; 34 years ago
- Parent institution: Maricopa County Community College District
- Academic affiliations: Space-grant
- President: Rey Rivera
- Students: 15,000
- Location: Avondale, Arizona, U.S. 33°28′49″N 112°20′37″W
- Campus: Urban
- Branches: Buckeye
- Colors: Purple & gold
- Nickname: Mountain Lions
- Sporting affiliations: Arizona Community College Athletic Conference
- Mascot: Roary the Estrella Mountain Lion
- Website: www.estrellamountain.edu

Estrella Mountain Community College (EMCC) is a public community college in Avondale, Arizona. The college has been serving the Southwest Valley community since 1990 and at the Avondale campus since 1992. Estrella Mountain is one of the ten Maricopa County Community College District (one of the largest community college districts in the United States) that provides educational opportunities and workforce training to the burgeoning western metropolitan Phoenix population of more than 285,000 residents.

== Academics ==
Serving an average of 14,000 students per year, EMCC offers numerous associate degrees, university transfer partnerships, and multiple specialized certificate programs. In addition, the college is the home to the SouthWest Skill Center. Courses are taught by more than 300 resident and adjunct faculty. Average class size consists of approximately 20–32 credit students per instructor.

The college is accredited by the Higher Learning Commission.

== Research ==
Students at EMCC have conducted research into the habitat, migration patterns, and mating habits of burrowing owls.
