= Rio Salado College =

Community college in Tempe, Arizona, US

- Other name: RSC
- Type: Public community college
- Established: 1978; 48 years ago
- Parent institution: Maricopa County Community College District
- President: Kate Smith
- Students: 52,881 (2016-17)
- Location: Tempe, Arizona, United States; 33°24′46″N 111°58′26″W
- Campus: Urban
- Branches: Avondale; Luke Air Force Base; Phoenix; Queen Creek; Surprise
- Colors: Blue, Sky Blue and Navy Blue
- Nickname: Rio Waves
- Mascot: Splash
- Website: riosalado.edu

Rio Salado Community College Campus in Tempe, Arizona, on August 2026. From left to right: Buildings A, B, and C. Far right is the related MCCCD administrative headquarters.

Rio Salado College is a public community college headquartered in Tempe, Arizona United States. It is part of the Maricopa County Community College District and accredited by the Higher Learning Commission. It offers bachelor's and associate degrees and certificate programs.

== History ==
Rio Salado College was founded on March 14, 1978 as one of 10 Maricopa Community Colleges. At the time, the college offered remote classrooms in 180 facilities throughout the Valley of the Sun. Rio Salado College offered its first online classes in 1996 and by 2006 had converted a majority of its course offerings to an online format. The school is recognized as a leader in higher education innovation, specializing in online education and distance learning.

== Accreditation ==
Rio Salado College is accredited by The Higher Learning Commission.

== Campuses ==
=== Tempe Headquarters ===
The administrative headquarters of Rio Salado College are in Tempe, Arizona. Rio Salado relocated from its original location in Phoenix to Tempe in 1996. The Tempe location houses three main buildings: The Conference Center at Rio, the Tower at Rio, and the Rio at Hohokam administrative building.

=== Satellite Locations ===
Rio Salado College is affiliated with 15 physical locations across Maricopa County, including 14 RSC locations and the SPOT 127 Youth Media Center. Services and hours of operation vary by location. The college also provides educational services through its incarcerated re-entry program at ASPC-Lewis and ASPC-Perryville. In addition to College Bridge Pathways programming that includes: Adult Basic Education, Adult Secondary Education, Adults Achieving a College Education, High School Equivalency preparation, English Language Acquisition for Adults and STAR-Path Model options at Avondale, RSC Lifelong Learning Center, and RSC Thomas.

=== School of Dental Hygiene ===
The Rio Salado College School of Dental Hygiene offers an accredited dental hygiene program. The school has been training students since 1998. It is a partnership between Rio Salado College, The Arizona Dental Association and Delta Dental Insurance. The School of Dental Hygiene moved from the West Valley to its current location at the Tempe HQ in 2012.
