= Chandler–Gilbert Community College =

Public college in Maricopa County, Arizona., US

Chandler-Gilbert Community College
- Other name: CGCC
- Motto: A small college with a big heart (informal)
- Type: Public community college
- Established: 1992; 34 years ago
- Parent institution: Maricopa County Community College District
- Accreditation: Higher Learning Commission
- President: CJ Wurster
- Students: 13,775 (fall 2022)
- Location: Chandler, Arizona, United States; 33°17′36″N 111°47′46″W
- Campus: Urban
- Branches: Mesa, Sun Lakes, Queen Creek
- Colors: Teal and silver
- Nickname: Coyotes
- Sporting affiliations: Arizona Community College Athletic Conference; National Junior College Athletic Association
- Mascot: Cody Coyote
- Website: www.cgc.edu

Chandler–Gilbert Community College (CGCC) is a public community college with multiple locations in Maricopa County, Arizona. It is part of the Maricopa County Community College District. In fall 2018, 14,728 students were enrolled at the college.

== History ==
CGCC was founded in 1985 as an extension of Mesa Community College. It was later independently accredited in 1992.

=== Presidents ===
- Arnette Scott Ward (1985–2002)
- Maria Hesse (2002–2009)
- Linda Lujan (2009–2015)
- William Guerriero (2015–2018)
- Greg Peterson (2018–2024)
- CJ Wurster (2024–present)

== Campus ==
The college operates from four locations including the Pecos campus, Williams campus, Sun Lakes center and Communiversity in Queen Creek.

== Academics ==
The college is divided into twelve divisions, which are Aviation and Applied Technology Division, Biological Sciences Division, Business and Computing Studies Division, Communication and Fine Arts Division, Composition, Creative Writing and Literature Division, Modern Languages and Humanities Division, Social and Behavioral Sciences Division, Mathematics Division, Nursing Division, and Health Sciences Division, Physical Sciences and Engineering Division, and Library, Learning Center, and Counseling Division.

== Student life ==
The college athletics teams are nicknamed the Coyotes.

== Notable alumni ==
- Andre Ethier, professional baseball player
- Jaron Long, professional baseball player
- James Pazos, professional baseball player
- Dennis Sarfate, professional baseball player
- Eric Young Jr., professional baseball player
