= Scottsdale Community College =

Community college in Scottsdale, Arizona, U.S.

- Type: Public community college
- Established: 1969; 57 years ago
- Parent institution: Maricopa County Community College District
- Accreditation: HLC
- President: Eric Leshinskie
- Students: 9,458
- Location: Scottsdale, Arizona, United States; 33°30′44″N 111°53′07″W
- Campus: Urban, 52 Acres
- Colors: Green and Gold
- Nickname: Fighting Artichokes
- Sporting affiliations: National Junior College Athletic Association; Arizona Community College Athletic Conference
- Mascot: Artie the Artichoke
- Website: www.scottsdalecc.edu

Scottsdale Community College is a public community college just outside of Scottsdale, Arizona. It is on the city's eastern boundary, on 160 acres (650,000 m^{2}) of land belonging to the Salt River Pima-Maricopa Indian Community. The lease was taken out in 1970 and expires in 2069. The college is part of the Maricopa County Community College District.

== History ==
Planning for Scottsdale Community College (SCC) began in 1967. On November 5, 1968, the MCCCD governing board allocated $5 million to build the campus. In the fall of 1969 SCC began holding night classes at Scottsdale High School, and on September 21, 1969, the Salt River Pima-Maricopa Indian Community and Bureau of Indian Affairs leased 160 acres of land at Chaparral and Pima Roads for 99 years. In August 1970, SCC held its first classes at its permanent location; several temporary wooden barracks were used as classroom space while construction began on the campus. The campus was designed by Phoenix architects Drover, Welch & Lindlan and built between 1970 and 1972. SCC established its nursing program in 1974 and received full accreditation in 1975. In 1977 the performing arts center opened, designed by Phoenix architects Guirey, Srnka Arnold & Sprinkle. A new music building was added in 1980. In 1982 the school's Culinary Arts Program Restaurant opened as did the Community Garden. On April 1, 1986, ground was broken for the Social Behavioral Science Building. By 1990, SCC's student population was 10,000, up from 1,000 in 1970. The Applied Sciences Building opened in 1998, designed by local architect Doug Sydnor; it is home to The Artichoke Grill. The school's library was built in the early 1970s and renovated in 2015. The Cloud Song Center for business students opened in 2018.

== Campus ==
SCC is the nation's only public community college on tribal land. The college also hosts NAU-Scottsdale, which offers several undergraduate programs, as well as the SCC2NAU program. SCC2NAU is a joint admission program between Scottsdale Community College and Northern Arizona University.

== Academics ==
Scottsdale Community College offers associate degrees as well as Certificates of Completion.

== Notable alumni ==
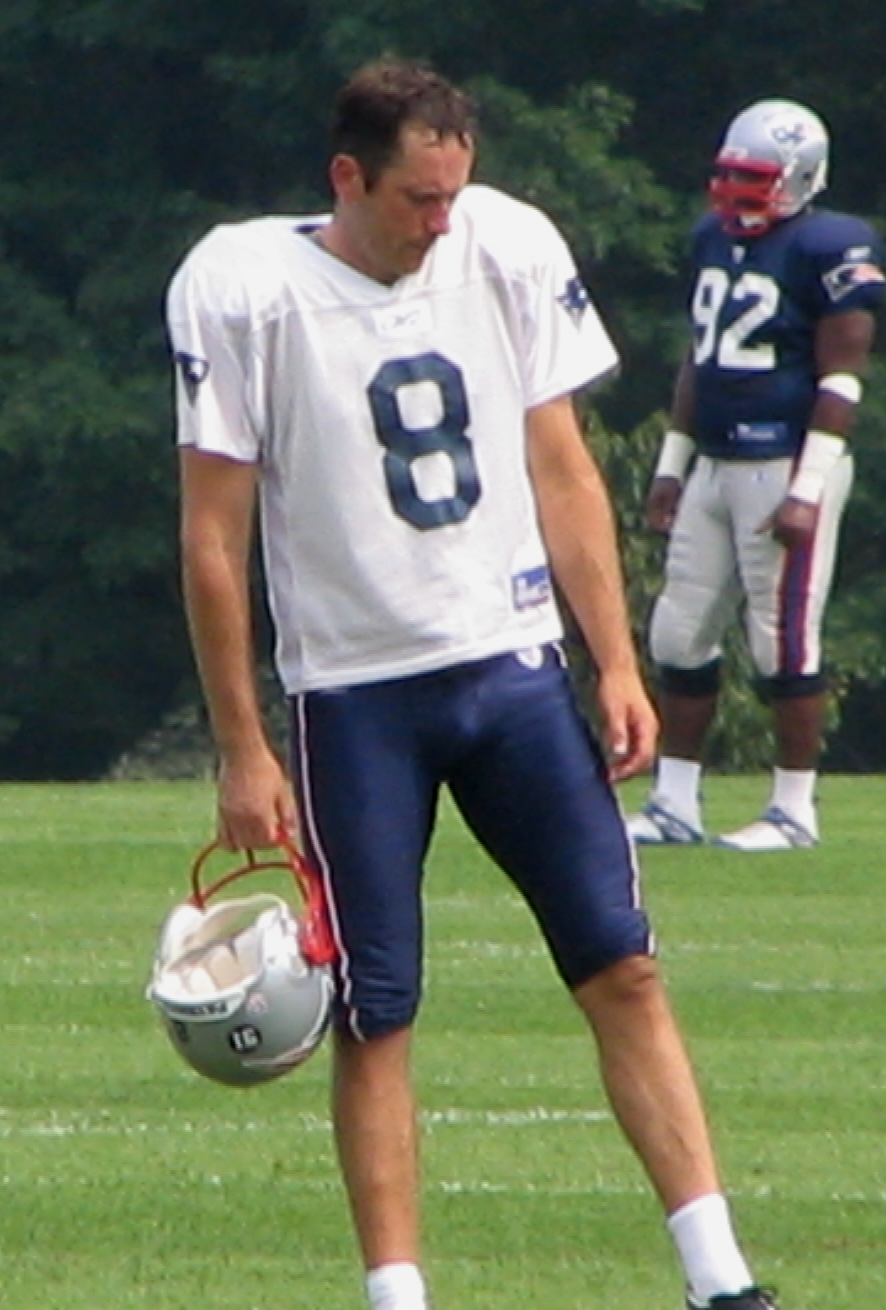
Josh Miller

- Ryneldi Becenti, the first Native American to play in the WNBA
- Scott Emerson, Major League Baseball pitching coach
- Tim Esmay, former Arizona State head baseball coach
- Charlie Garner, former NFL football player
- Robert Garrigus, PGA Tour professional
- Bill Hader, actor (Saturday Night Live cast member (2005–2013), Trainwreck)
- Josh Miller (born 1970), American football player and football analyst
- Siera Santos, TV Host for MLB Network and NHL Network
- David Spade, actor (Saturday Night Live, Just Shoot Me!, Rules of Engagement, The Benchwarmers, The Emperor's New Groove)
- Will Tukuafu, Samoan-American NFL football player for the Chargers
- Terry Wright, former NFL football player
- Trent Horn, Catholic academic and host of apologetics-focused show The Counsel of Trent on Catholic Answers

== Gallery ==
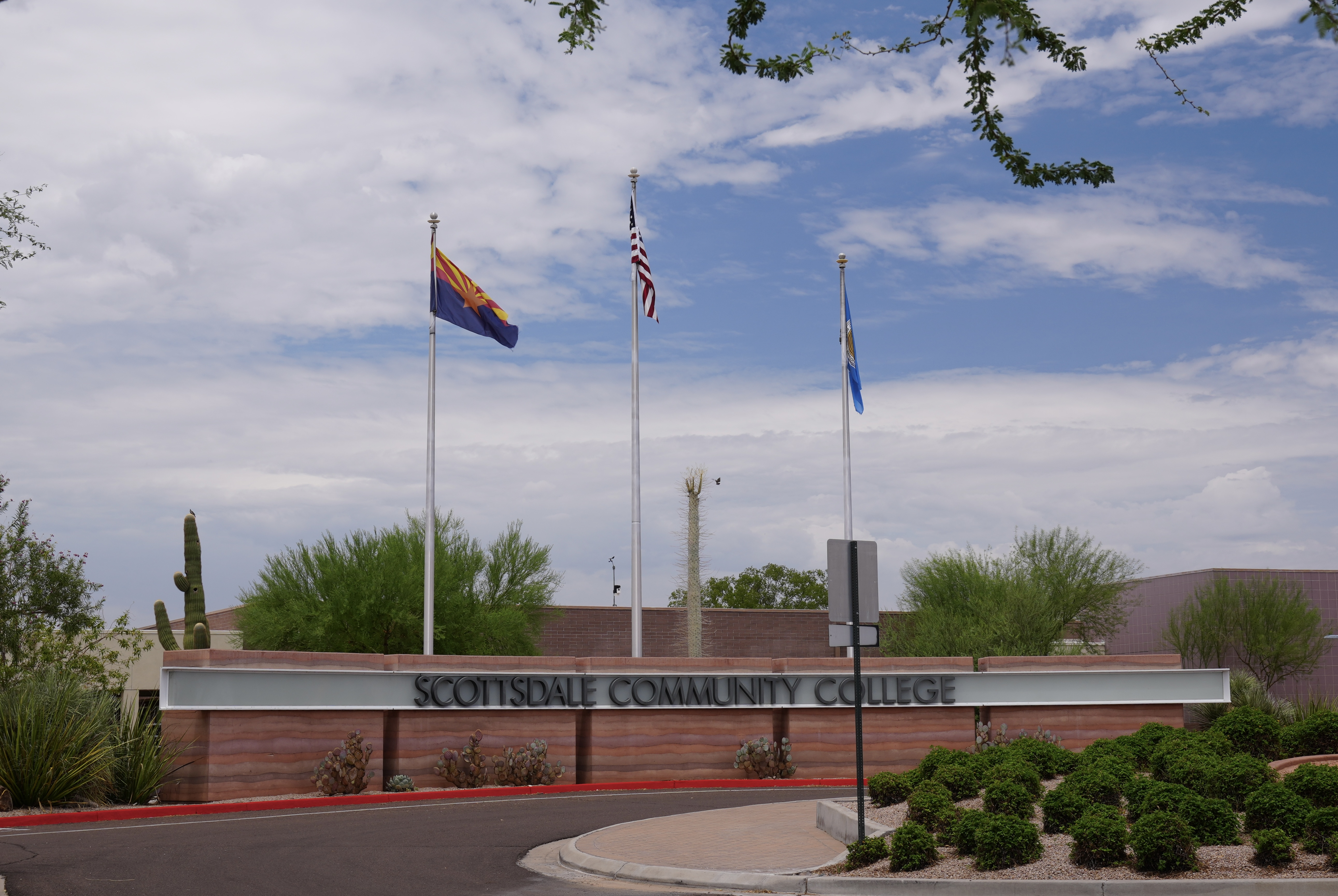
Scottsdale Community College

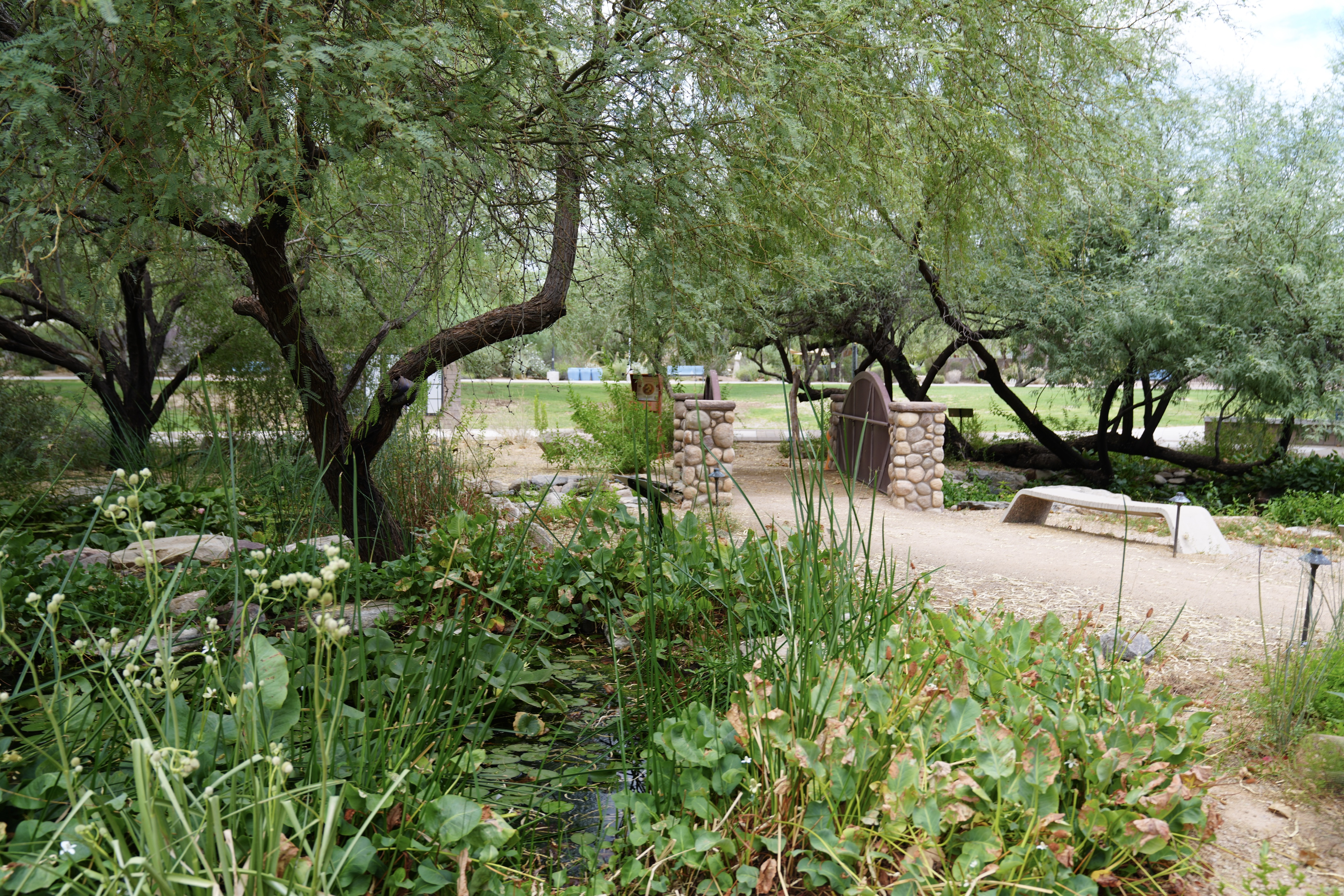
Scottsdale Community College “Two Waters Circle” riparian ecosystem area.

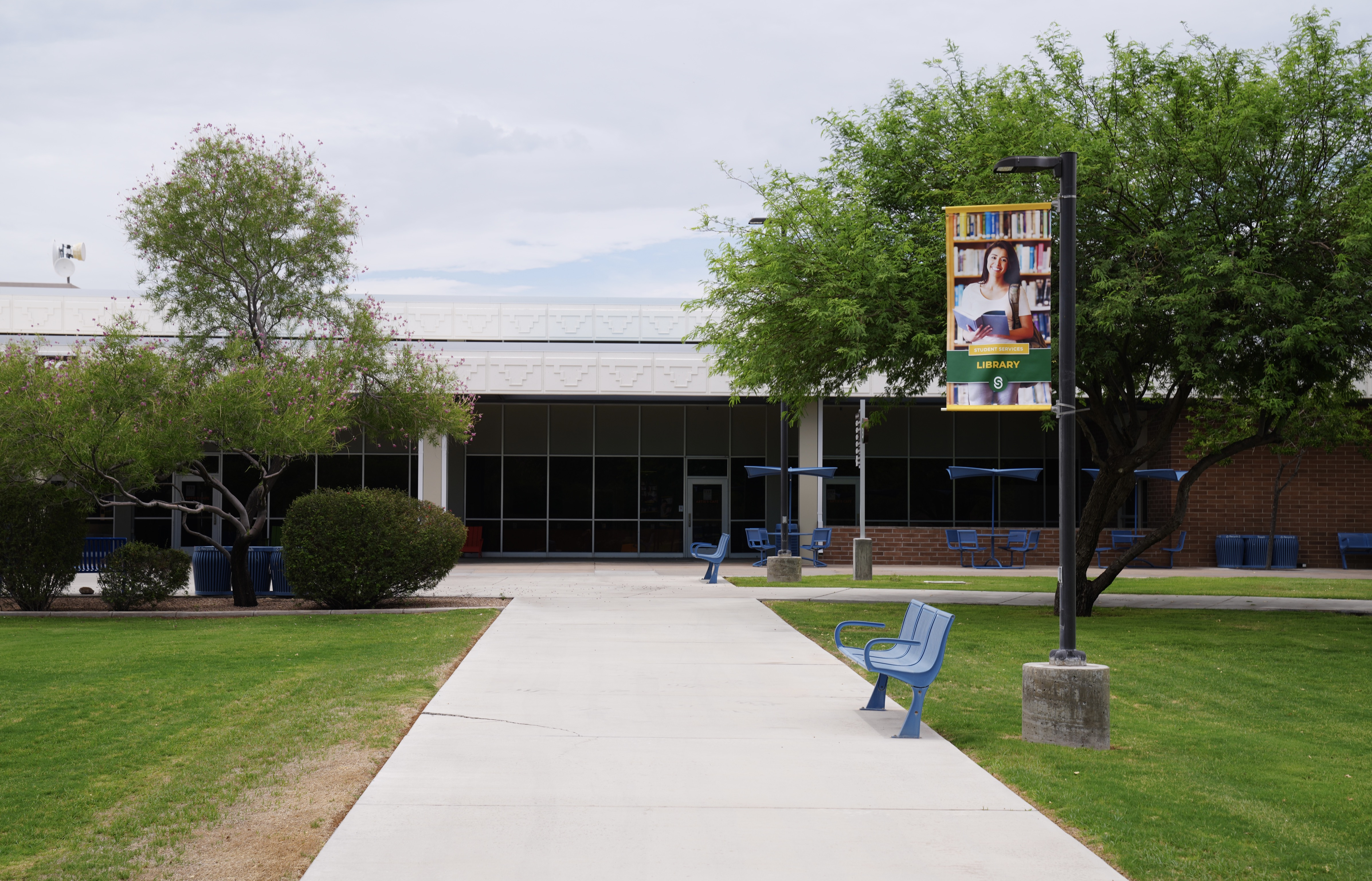
Scottsdale Community College, the buildings are all of modern one level construction.

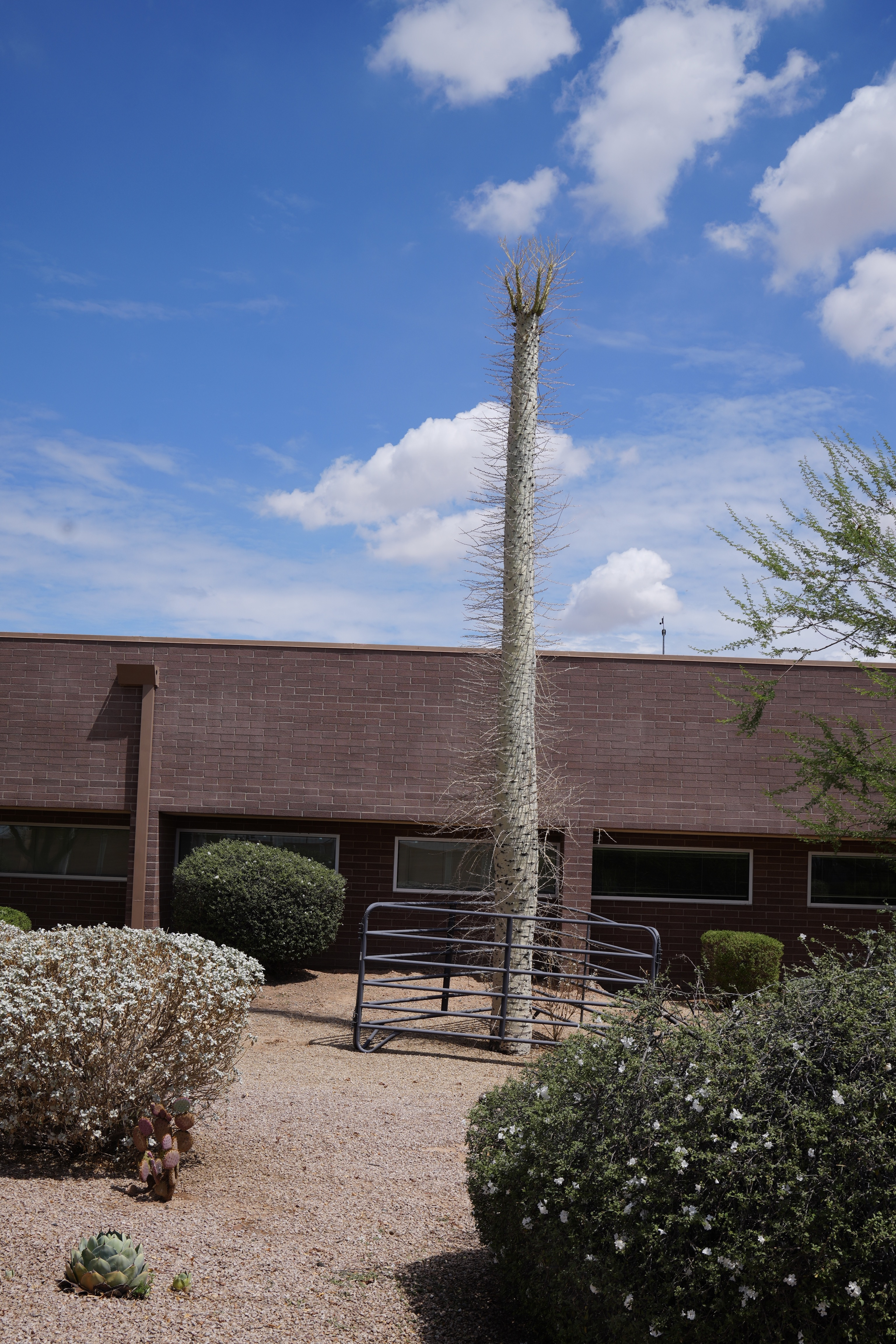
Scottsdale Community College Campus has a variety of desert plants including this large rare boojum tree.

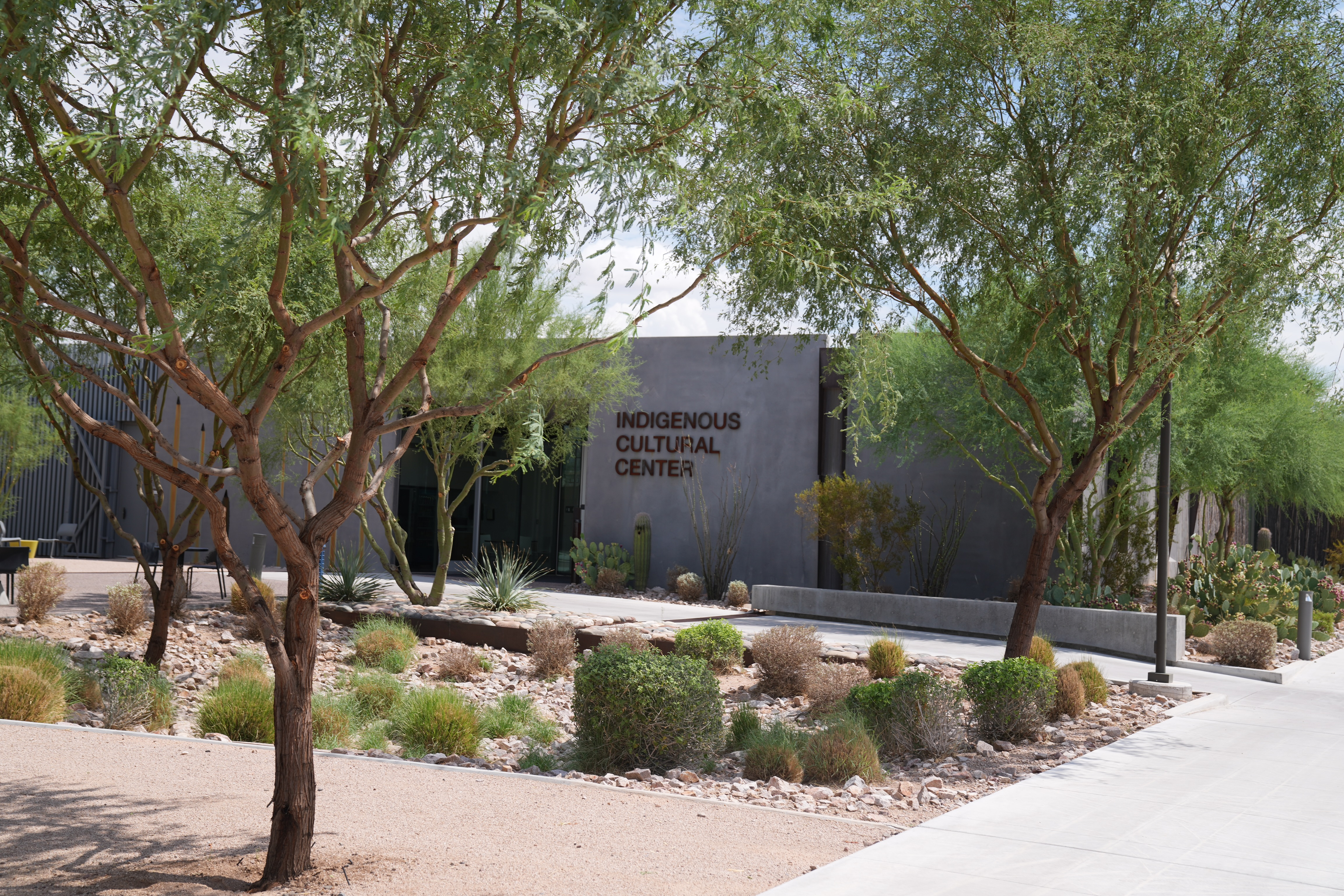
Scottsdale Community College Indigenous Cultural Center

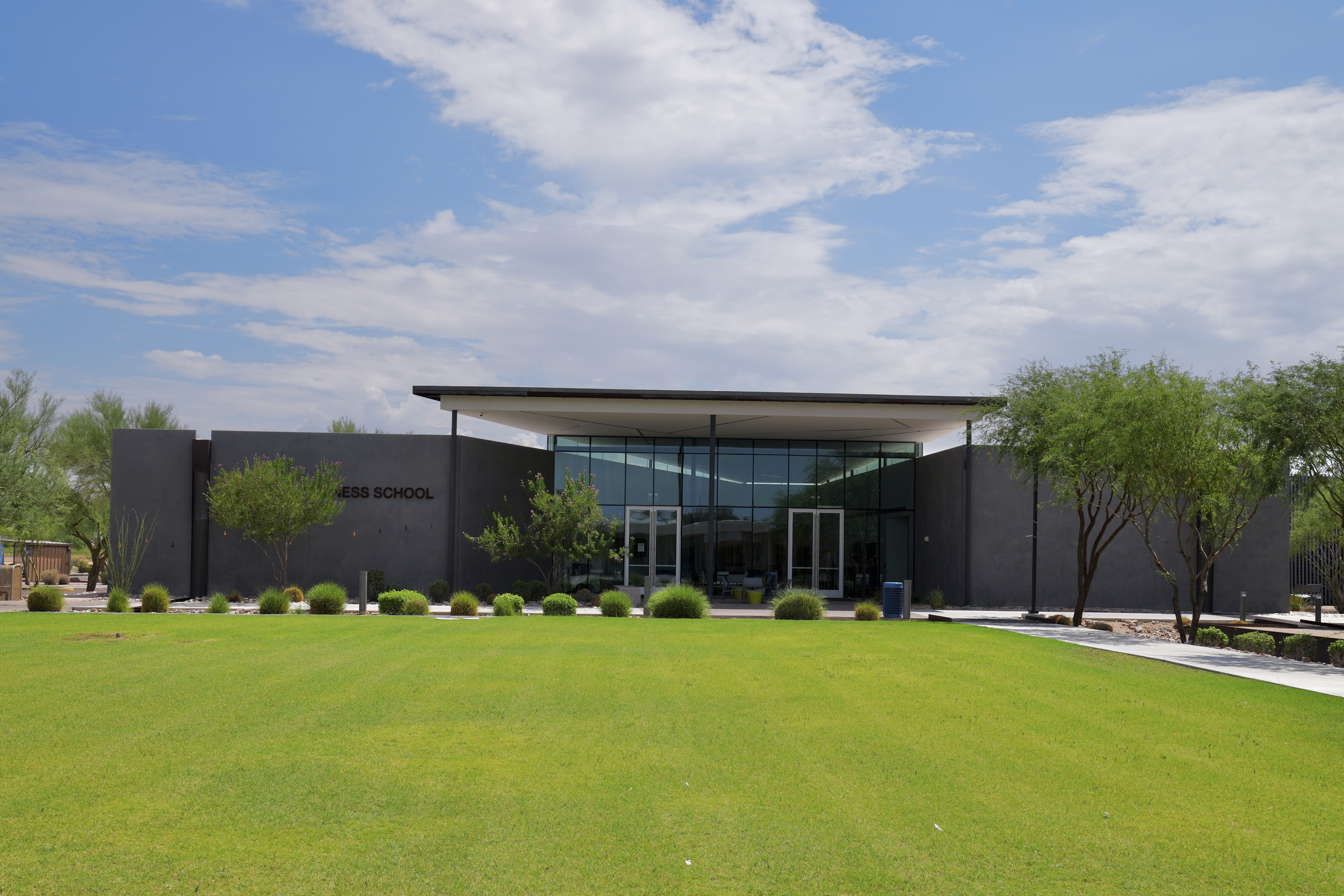
Scottsdale Community College Business School
