= KRDP =

Online radio station in Phoenix, Arizona

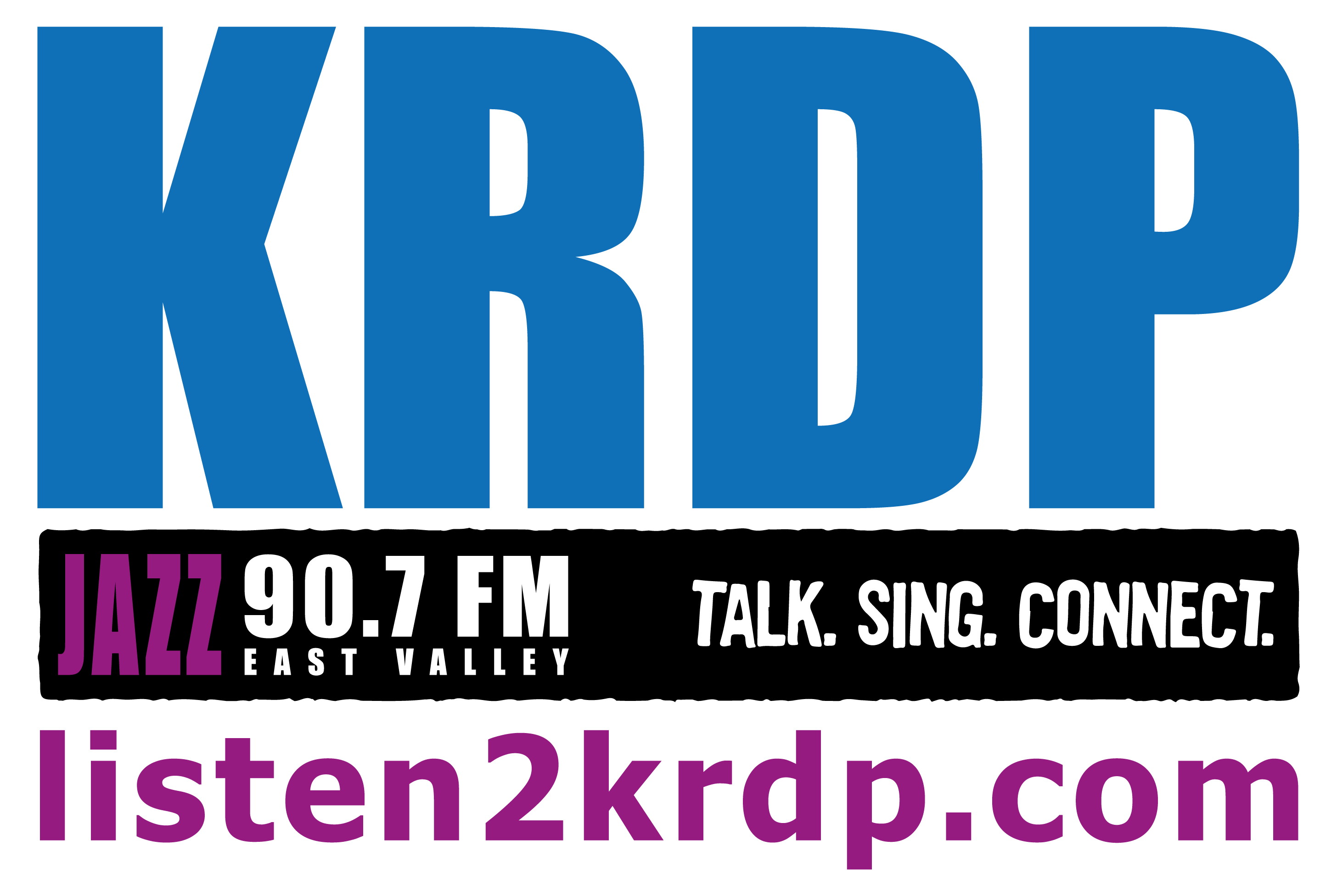
- Apache Junction, Arizona; United States
- Broadcast area: East Valley (Phoenix metropolitan area)
- Frequency: 90.7 MHz
- Branding: KRDP Jazz

Programming
- Format: community radio; variety

Ownership
- Owner: Desert Soul Media, Inc.

History
- First air date: October 31, 2008
- Former call signs: KRDP (2008–2011); KVIT (2011–2021)
- Call sign meaning: "Radio Phoenix"

Technical information
- Licensing authority: FCC
- Facility ID: 122359
- Class: A
- ERP: 2,000 watts
- HAAT: 18 meters (59 ft)

Links
- Public license information: Public file; LMS
- Webcast: Listen live
- Website: listen2krdp.com

KRDP (90.7 FM) is a non-commercial radio station licensed to Apache Junction, Arizona, and serving the East Valley of the Phoenix metro area. KRDP is owned by Desert Soul Media, Inc. airs a Jazz, Blues and Soul music format mixed with community news, public affairs and specialty programming primarily targeting Arizona's African American community. KRDP's transmitter is located at the Goldfield Ghost Town in Apache Junction.

KRDP previously broadcast under the call sign KVIT and was operated from 2011 to 2021 by the East Valley Institute of Technology (EVIT), a technical high school district in Mesa, Arizona. EVIT sold KRDP to Desert Soul Media, Inc. and the sale closed in December 2021.

KRDP also operates an online-only radio station called KRDP Indie, which streams an Adult album alternative (AAA) music format mixed with news, public affairs and specialty programming from local, national and international producers focused on independent music, arts and culture. KRDP Indie was previously operated under the name Radio Phoenix from 2008 to 2021 by the Arizona Community Media Foundation.

== History ==
KRDP began its broadcast history under the ownership of the East Valley Institute of Technology (EVIT) with call sign KVIT. After numerous failed attempts the station signed on the air on January 29, 2011, as The Goldmine 90.7, which aired a Top 40 format.

In May 2012, KVIT began simulcasting on K224CJ 92.7 FM, which had been simulcasting KNRJ "Energy 101.1", a dance hits station. The Goldmine soon adopted a significant shift towards a dance format helmed by former Energy 92.7 (later 101.1 The Beat) DJ and EVIT alumnus, DJ Perry, who had been programming and doing mixshows since before the station signed on.

On November 6, 2013, the dance-intensive format known as The Pulse was launched.

On August 11, 2015, KVIT's format moved to new station KPNG (88.7 FM), also owned by EVIT. On September 25, 2016, KVIT broke from the KPNG simulcast and its format was changed to classic country, returning to The Goldmine branding.

On May 23, 2018, KVIT's format changed to '80s/'90s variety, with an emphasis on '90s pop, changing its name to "Neon 90.7". This change was not announced and followed almost 24 hours of non-stop Dueling Banjos from the movie Deliverance.

On May 24, 2021, it was announced that KVIT was being sold to Desert Soul Media, Inc. for $125,000. The station was taken silent on December 10, 2021, and returned to the air on May 10, 2022.
