= East Valley (Phoenix metropolitan area) =

Part of Metropolitan Phoenix in Arizona

Coordinates: 33.38°N 111.73°W

The Phoenix Metropolitan Area (Metro Phoenix) consists of a valley that has multiple city regions in it. The East Valley is a multi-city region within the Phoenix Metropolitan Area of Arizona. East Valley is a loosely defined region, with various definitions of what constitutes it.

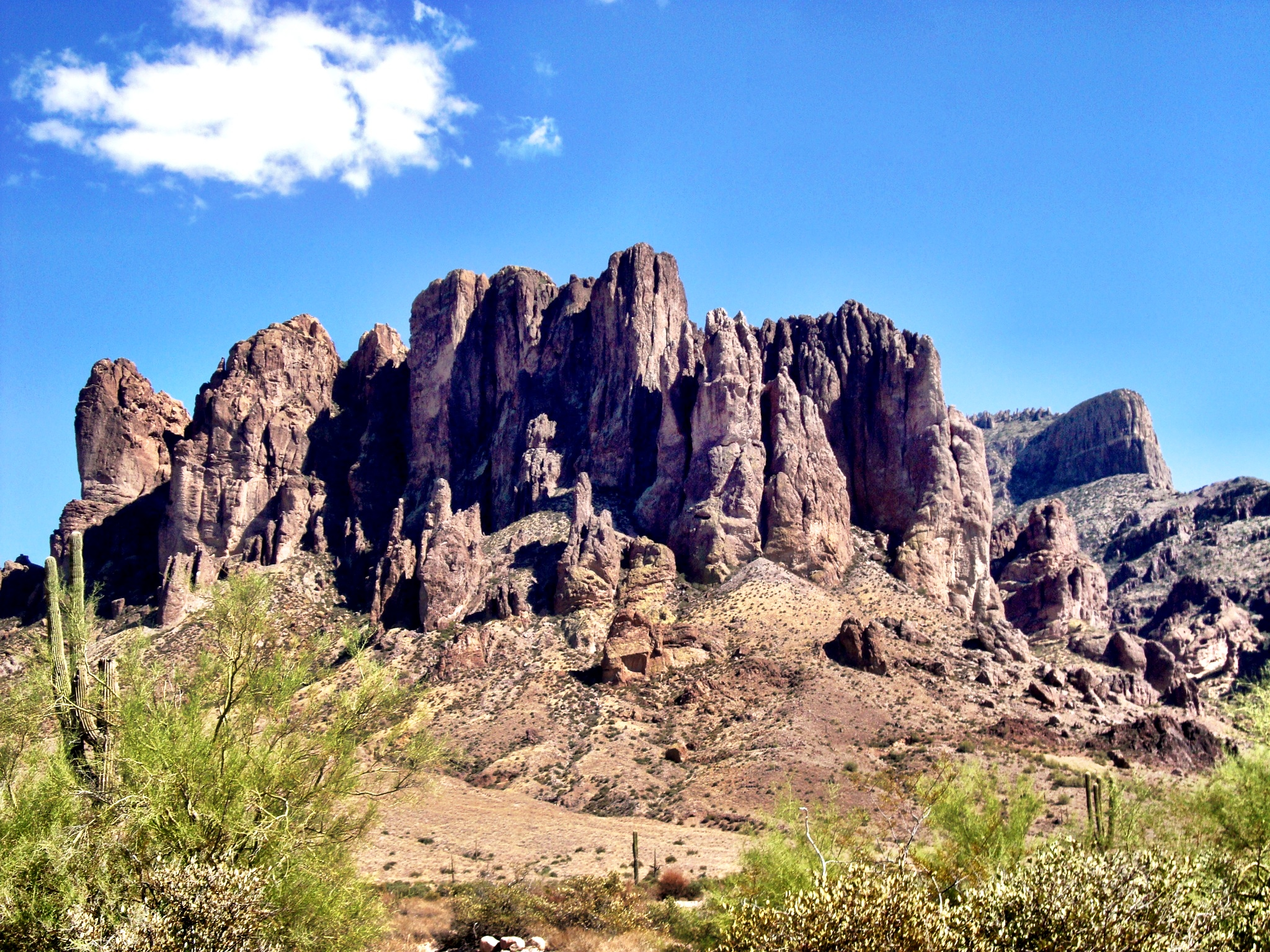
Superstition Mountain

PHX East Valley, a project with an area coalition known as the East Valley Partnership, defines the East Valley as an area that encompasses Apache Junction, Chandler, Gilbert, Mesa, Queen Creek, and Tempe.

The East Valley Tribune, a newspaper that serves the region, considers Chandler, Gilbert, Mesa, Queen Creek, San Tan Valley, and Tempe as its service area. The newspaper formerly served Scottsdale as well, but was pulled out of the city in 2009.

Ahwatukee Foothills, which is an urban village of the City of Phoenix, is normally considered to be part of the East Valley as well.

Valley Metro defines its East Valley service area for its ADA Paratransit service to include Chandler, Gilbert, Mesa, Tempe, and Scottsdale.

== History ==
The use of the term "East Valley" to describe the city eastern to Metropolitan Phoenix emerged in the early 1980s. Metro Phoenix is in the Salt River Valley, which has been marketed as the Valley of the Sun. A newspaper publisher, Charles Wahlheim, started using “East Valley” for articles in Mesa Tribune, Chandler Arizonan, and the Tempe Daily News. These newspapers were commonly purchased by the Cox newspaper chain out of Atlanta - as a marketing device aimed at giving his company's newspapers creditability as alternatives to the powerful Phoenix-based Arizona Republic and Phoenix Gazette.

In 1980, Phoenix dwarfed other cities in the region with a population of 789,704. Mesa was the next biggest city with a population of 152,404, followed by Tempe with a population of 106,919. A group called the Phoenix 40 heavily influenced the region's politics and business matters affecting the entire region. Wahlheim approached Chandler grocery-chain owner Eddie Basha and asked him to help create a business group as answer to the East Valley's Phoenix 40. That group was named the East Valley Partnership, an organization of business, education and political leaders that continues to advocate on behalf of the East Valley and its cities. One of the founders of the partnership was the late Jack Whiteman of Empire Southwest, a heavy equipment company. "My dad and a number of East Valley businesses wanted to have the East Valley equivalent of the Phoenix 40," John Whiteman, who followed his dad as head of the prosperous dealership, told the East Valley Tribune. "Back then everything seemed to be going to Phoenix."

Ten years after the regional concept was introduced, it was politically institutionalized with the state legislature's creation of the East Valley Institute of Technology. What had once been the Mesa Vocational School was given a new name and an East Valley-wide tax base. Today, its services are offered to 10 school districts.

== Demographics ==
The East Valley experienced a population increase of 41 percent, going from 937,638 in 2000 to 1,324,922 in 2011, according to U.S. Census data.

The 2011 median household income in the East Valley was reported $64,659, up from $52,100 in 2000. The 2011 median household income is also higher in the East Valley than Metropolitan Phoenix, the state of Arizona, and the entire United States.

The median sales price of a single family home in the East Valley is $205,850. This figure is also higher than the median price of a single family home in Metropolitan Phoenix, the West Valley, all of Arizona, and the United States.

The cost of living in the East Valley is quite low for such a thriving area. It has a composite score of 102 (NOTE: US average = 100), compared to 109 of Las Vegas, Nevada, 110 of Denver, Colorado, 118 of Santa Fe, New Mexico, and 147 of Los Angeles, California.

A variety of forces combined to strengthen the East Valley region's identity and political parity, but none was more important than a 30-year surge in population that saw Mesa nearly triple in its population and Chandler grow from 29,173 to 236,123 and the town of Gilbert skyrocket from 5,717 to 208,453. The cities in the East Valley literally grew together. The city of Phoenix grew, too, but not at the same rate as it didn't quite double its population in the 30-year span ending in 2010.

Ironically, The Arizona Republic contributed to the East Valley's separate identity in the mid-1990s by publishing a Sunday section called East Valley.

Perhaps equally as ironic, the grouping of newspapers that Wahlheim had assembled did not incorporate East Valley into its nameplate until new owners had combined the newspaper's community editions into a single newspaper called The Tribune. It wasn't until 1999 that the newspaper retitled itself the East Valley Tribune.

== Education ==
East Valley K-12 students are served by 14 school districts, 125 charter schools and one regional career-focused district (East Valley Institute of Technology). One measure of the academic quality of East Valley schools is that the region qualified 12 schools to compete in the 2012 Arizona Academic Decathlon competition - more than any other region.

=== Arizona State University ===
With 33 percent of its population age 25 and above holding bachelor's degrees, higher education is a priority. Arizona State University's main campus in Tempe serves more than 49,000 undergraduate students and more than 10,000 graduate students. The ASU Polytechnic Campus in East Mesa serves more than 9,500 undergraduate students and nearly 1,000 graduate students.

The Aerospace and Defense Research Collaboratory, which support aerospace and defense industries is housed at the Polytechnic Campus in the College of Technology and Innovation adjacent to Phoenix-Mesa Gateway Airport in East Mesa. The airport and campus are on the grounds of what was Williams Air Force Base and in an area focused on aerospace industry development.

Another example is ASU's Skysong Center in Scottsdale, located not far from the General Dynamics C-4 Systems facility. ASU describes Skysong as "an innovation center designed to help companies grow by providing business services and programs offered or facilitated by Arizona State University. These services include access to new technologies, capital networks, business education and a skilled workforce.

=== Community Colleges ===
Private colleges serve another 11,000 students in the East Valley. The community college system has enrolled 160,000 students at five East Valley colleges. They include the Chandler-Gilbert Community College, Mesa Community College, Rio Salado College, Scottsdale Community College and Central Arizona College.

=== East Valley Institute of Technology ===
For more than 20 years, the East Valley Institute of Technology (EVIT) has offered students in 10 East Valley school districts a wide range of career and technical education courses. The courses prepare students with skills for immediate entry into the local job market, but many are on career tracks that lead to higher education. More than 60 percent of the 3,000 students taking EVIT courses go on to college. EVIT is funded by a property tax levied on property owners in the 10 districts.

EVIT has two campuses. The main campus opened in Mesa in 1998 at a cost of $46 million. It spans 65 acres with 15 buildings. The campus's long-time culinary and automotive technologies programs are highly regarded, but EVIT also serves the East Valley job market with such course offerings as 3D animation, electronics/robotics and engineering science.

In 2007 and 2011 new health science buildings were opened at the main campus and quickly reached capacity. Programs offered to health and science students include biotechnology; nursing; sterile processing and distribution; and dental assisting. Many of the students are on track to enter medical school.

EVIT also offers tuition-based career education programs for adults.

In 2011 EVIT opened a 10-acre, $17 million campus in east Mesa that is clustered with the Arizona State University Polytechnic campus, the Chandler-Gilbert Community College Williams campus and Phoenix-Mesa Gateway Airport. It is focused on health and aviation programs. Aviation students are trained for jobs in the East Valley's and state's robust aerospace sector. Arizona is fifth in the nation in aviation and aerospace employment.

== Aviation and aerospace ==
The East Valley Aviation & Aerospace Alliance estimates aerospace accounts for 35,000 high-paying jobs and generates $3.5 billion a year in the East Valley. The Alliance is working with the Arizona Commerce Authority to extend the sector's reach by obtaining selections of the state of Arizona as a center of excellence for development and testing of unmanned aerial systems.

Among the sector drivers in the East Valley are the Boeing Corporation, Orbital ATK, Honeywell Aerospace, Able Aerospace Services, Phoenix-Mesa Gateway Airport, Cessna, and Arizona Laboratories for Security and Defense Research (AZLabs).

Mesa is the home of Boeing's sixth largest site where it assembles the Apache Longbow attack helicopter and the A160 Hummingbird unmanned aerial vehicle helicopter. Boeing will test the unmanned helicopter in restricted aerospace near the town of Florence, a short distance south of the East Valley. Boeing has a workforce in Mesa of 4,700 employees. It utilizes 576 Arizona suppliers and annually spends $1.2 billion.

Virginia-based Orbital ATK has about half of its workforce in the East Valley. In Chandler, the company designs tests and manufactures space launch vehicles, including the Pegasus and Minotaur rockets. In the town of Gilbert, Orbital ATK assembles and tests satellites. Orbital ATK describes its 135,000 square-foot satellite facility as one of the most advanced of its kind. In the past, Orbital ATK has focused on government satellite projects. But it is ramping up Gilbert operations for a major commercial project. It will assemble and test 81 satellites for the Iridium NEXT global communications system. In a 2011 press release, Iridium CEO Matt Desch said, "With this contract, Orbital becomes part of the most significant commercial space project in the world." Iridium satellites are to be launched starting in 2015.

The East Valley is also home of the Phoenix-Mesa Gateway Airport one of the nation's most successful military base reuse projects. Formerly Williams Air Force Base, the growing reliever airport boasts a remodeled passenger terminal, convenient parking and three runways, the longest of which is 10,401 feet. The shortest is 9,301 feet. The airport currently serves Allegiant Airlines. East Valley leaders see it as an international aerospace center and a catalyst for bringing 100,000 jobs to the far East Valley in 20 years. The airport is located in Foreign Trade Zone 221. As of 2012, Gateway hosts more than 40 companies, serves 33 cities with non-stop service via Allegiant, Frontier, and Spirit Airlines as well as eight more cities with continuing service, and contributes $685 million annually to the Arizona economy. The airport's master plan projects more than 850,000 enplanements by 2017 and 2.2 million by 2027.

Another promising military facility reuse project is AZLabs, formerly the Air Force Research Laboratory. The Defense Department in 2011 turned ownership of the facility over to the city of Mesa. The lab is near Phoenix-Mesa Gateway Airport and Arizona State University Polytechnic campus. Alion Science and Technology manages the 97,500 square foot facility and describes it as ideally suited for hosting classified research programs.

The East Valley also boasts three busy general aviation airports: the Chandler Municipal Airport, Falcon Field Airport in Mesa, and the Scottsdale Airport. Falcon Field and Scottsdale Airport served as World War II pilot training fields. British military pilots trained at Falcon Field and Americans in Scottsdale. In 2011, Falcon Field was the 5th busiest general aviation airport in the country. Located adjacent to Boeing, Falcon Field contributes over $2.3 billion to the local economy. With about 130,000 operations in 2010, Scottsdale Airport bills itself as one of the busiest single-runway facilities in the world. It is centrally located in Scottsdale's only industrial-zoned area. The Commerce Airpark area is headquarters to over 30 national/regional corporations and home to nearly 2,500 small and medium-sized businesses with over 48,000 jobs.

== Economy ==
=== Intel ===
No single company has had a more profound impact on the East Valley than the Intel Corporation. The company has 10,300 employees working in the city of Chandler—the company's second largest U.S. site. According to a news backgrounder that Intel prepared for a January 2012 visit by President Barack Obama, the company's annual economic impact in Arizona tops $2.6 billion. This includes more than 20,000 non-Intel jobs resulting from the company's presence in the state.

Intel is currently expanding its Ocotillo campus in Chandler by building a new chip manufacturing facility, called Fab. 42. Intel announced the $5 billion investment in its Chandler operation during a 2011 presidential visit to its Oregon campus. Intel says that Fab 42 will be the most advanced high-volume semiconductor manufacturing plant in the world. Construction of the facility will require thousands of people to put in more than 10 million hours. The plant is scheduled to open in 2013 and permanently employ 1,000 workers.

Intel began exploring locating a facility in Arizona in the late 1970s. The company bought 160 acres on West Chandler Boulevard in 1978. Intel began operations in 1980. Prior to the Fab 42 announcement Intel had invested over $12 billion in high-tech manufacturing capability in the state since 1996. Arizona is home to two high volume manufacturing facilities, Fab 12 and Fab 32. Fab 12 began operations in 1996. The $3 billion Fab 32 was opened in 2007.

In addition to its economic contributions, Intel has been a major contributor to the community. A fact sheet on the company's website said employees contributed $6.6 million to the United Way and 127,000 volunteer hours in 2009.

=== Growth ===
Prior to the Great Recession that marked its beginning at the end of 2007, phenomenal population growth was a powerful driver of the East Valley's economy. Even today, construction and maintenance comprises 12.59 percent of the workforce. Like many Sun Belt regions, the recession took a tremendous toll on home construction and ownership in the East Valley. But there are signs in early 2012 that the housing market is regaining strength.

As of March 2012, home sales in the Phoenix market had increased by 22 percent over February, according to the Arizona Regional Multiple Listing Service as reported in the East Valley Tribune. The Arizona Republic reported that median March home prices in the Phoenix area climbed by 7 percent over February. Prior to the recession, the "town" of Gilbert was one of America's fastest growing cities and in 2011 the town showed the spark was still there as it issued 1,545 single-family construction permits. That was a 46-percent increase over 2010. While a long way from the 5,070 single-family construction permits issued by the town in 2004, it was outpacing in raw numbers the much larger city of Phoenix, which by November had issued less than 1,000 such permits. And The Wall Street Journal in a March A1 story focused on metro Phoenix's improving housing market under the headline "Rise in Phoenix Housing Shows Plath for Other Cities."

World War II is often cited along with air conditioning as the genesis of the region's population boom. With three military pilot training fields in the East Valley, military personnel along with mechanics and office workers flocked to the region. Some never left and others came back after the war. The birth of Major League Baseball’s Cactus League and marketing drives to attract tourists and retirees to the region also played roles in boosting permanent population growth. Census numbers tell the story.

According to the East Valley Partnership, the 2011 population of the entire East Valley is 1,324,922. With a population of 439,041 as of the 2010 Census, Mesa is the East Valley's largest city and the 38th largest city in America. But in 1940, Census workers counted only 7,224 people living in Mesa. By the 1950 Census, population had more than doubled to 16,790. It doubled again by 1960 and again in 1970 and more than doubled by 1980. The torrid pace continued in the following two decades.

The town of Gilbert is another story of blazing growth. The outgrowth of a railroad crossing that serviced nearby farms, Gilbert numbered only 837 people in the 1940 Census. By 2000, 109,697 people called Gilbert home. Nearly another 100,000 people were counted in the 2010 Census, which recorded the town's population at 208,453. While retirees have contributed to the East Valley's growth and vitality, the town of Gilbert with an average age is 31.37 demonstrates that the commonly held belief that the region is dominated by retirees is a myth.

== Arts and culture ==
Each of the East Valley's major cities has performing arts centers and museums. The performing arts attractions range from community theater performances to such nationally acclaimed celebrities and performers as Bill Cosby, Earth, Wind & Fire, Joan Rivers and Jane Krakowski of 30 Rock. The venues include the Chandler Center for the Arts, the Higley Center for the Performing Arts of Gilbert, Queen Creek and southeastern Chandler area, the Tempe Center for the Arts, the Scottsdale Center for the Arts, the Mesa Arts Center, the Hale Centre Theatre Arizona in Gilbert, the Arizona Museum of Natural History in Mesa, the Arizona Historical Society's Museum at Papago Park in Tempe, the Arizona Museum for Youth in Mesa, the Gilbert Historical Museum and the Mesa Historical Museum, which has developed Play Ball: The Cactus League Experience.

One of the crown jewels of the East Valley's performing arts venues is the Mesa Arts Center, which CNN selected to host the February 2012 Republican primary presidential debate. The architecturally stunning center in downtown Mesa is the largest arts center in Arizona. It features four theaters, five art galleries, and 14 art studios.

== Outdoor and recreation ==
The East Valley is known for golf, eco-tourism and outdoor recreation enthusiasts, including hikers, bikers, birders, river rafters and floaters, fishermen, horse-back riders, climbers, hunters and four-wheel drive desert explorers. The East Valley is bounded on the north, east and south by mountains—the Superstitions, the San Tans, and McDowell Mountains. All are accessible through trails and park facilities.

The Tonto National Forest hugs the East Valley as does the lower Salt River valley basin and the Sonoran Desert.

For boaters, Saguaro Lake is within a half hour of most East Valley locations and the 21,000 acre Lake Roosevelt and the Lake Roosevelt National Recreation Area is a 90-minute drive.

In addition to the lakes, fishermen head for the Lower Salt River in the winter and spring. The Arizona Game and Fish Department stock the river with Rainbow trout during those months, though an occasional bass is also caught.

A series of four national forest parks follow the Salt River and just minutes from the Red Mountain Expressway. The Lost Dutchman State Park is on the eastern edge of the East Valley. There are three metropolitan parks—one bordering Scottsdale, one bordering Mesa and one on the south nestled in the San Tan Mountains.

The Gilbert Riparian preserve is well known to birders and is listed in the American Auto Club's 100 sites to see in Arizona. The Boyce Thompson Arboretum State Park with its collection of desert and riparian plants and wildlife is less than 45 minutes from most East Valley locations. The Desert Botanical Garden is located on Tempe’s western edge.

== Past attempts to secede from Maricopa County ==
In the past, there have been some attempts for the East Valley to secede from Maricopa County and form a new county. Former State Senator Russell Pearce has at times proposed bills which would ease county splits, as part of his effort to split off the East Valley portion of Maricopa County. Such proposed names for a new county for the East Valley included but were not limited to Red Mountain County and Rio Salado County. Two such attempts to secede were made. The first attempt was in the early 1990s and included the cities and towns of Mesa, Chandler, Gilbert, Queen Creek, Tempe, and Guadalupe. In the early 2000s, a second attempt was made, and included the same cities and towns as the early 1990s proposal except for Tempe and Guadalupe. Under both proposals, the seat of the proposed new county would have been Mesa. Russell Pearce's tenure as a State Senator has since ended in November 2011 and the issue of county secession has not resurfaced ever since.
