= East Valley Institute of Technology =

Location
- Mesa, Arizona; United States
- 33.413251°N 111.864662°W

Information
- Type: Joint technological education district school
- Established: 1991
- School district: East Valley Institute of Technology District #401
- Grades: 10-12, adult
- Website: www.evit.com

The East Valley Institute of Technology (EVIT) is a public school district serving the eastern portion of the Phoenix, Arizona metro area in Maricopa and Pinal counties. It is a joint technological education district with programs are available to students at the member high schools. EVIT serves 10th, 11th, and 12th grade students from the sending districts that meet class prerequisites.

== Accreditation ==
The East Valley Institute of Technology is accredited by the North Central Association Commission on Accreditation and School Improvement.

== Campuses ==
=== Dr. A. Keith Crandell (Main) Campus ===
The main campus, which opened in 1999, and is located at 1601 W. Main Street, was renamed the Dr. A. Keith Crandell Campus in December 2011. It is located in west Mesa near Main Street and Dobson adjacent to the METRO light rail at Longmore/Main.

It spans 65 acres, includes more than 15 buildings, and houses the Administrative and District offices along with Adult & Continuing Education.

=== East Campus ===
The East Campus located at 6625 S. Power Road opened in August 2011. The 10-acre, $17 million campus adjacent to ASU Polytechnic, is focused on health, aviation, and cosmetology programs for high school students.

== School districts ==
- Apache Junction Unified School District/Apache Junction High School
- Chandler Unified School District (5 high schools)
- Gilbert Public Schools (5 high schools)
- Higley Unified School District (2 high schools)
- J. O. Combs Unified School District/Combs High School
- Mesa Public Schools (6 high schools)
- Queen Creek Unified School District/Queen Creek High School
- Scottsdale Unified School District (4 high schools)
- Tempe Union High School District (6 high schools)

== See also ==
- Sycamore Drive (Dobson Road) and Main Street (Metro Light Rail station)
- KVIT FM 88.7 MHz
