= John Lewis (Arizona politician) =

American politician (born 1957)

Mayor of Gilbert, Arizona
- In office June 16, 2009 – July 19, 2016
- Preceded by: Steven M. Berman
- Succeeded by: Jenn Daniels

Personal details
- Born: October 3, 1957 (age 69)
- Party: Republican
- Spouse: LaCinda Smoot Lewis
- Children: 8
- Education: Brigham Young University (B.S.); University of Houston (MBA)

John Lewis (born October 3, 1957) is an American politician. He served as the mayor of Gilbert, Arizona from 2009 to 2016 when he resigned his post to become president and CEO of East Valley Partnership. Lewis is a member of the Republican Party.

Lewis was first elected in 2009, and was reelected in 2012.

== Personal life ==
Lewis was elected as Mayor of Gilbert in May 2009. Prior community involvement included serving as co-chairman of the Town's Diversity Task Force, organizer of Community Interfaith activities, and founder of Gilbert's "Constitution Week" celebration.

Lewis has 28 years of private sector business experience including 19 years with Apollo Group (parent company to the University of Phoenix) and nine years with Ernst & Young (International Accounting Firm). Assignments have included information technology management, leadership development, and management consulting. He also served in a staff position with U.S. Senator Jake Garn, in Washington DC. He also served as an adjunct faculty teacher in the Business Department at Mesa Community College.

Lewis earned an MBA from the University of Houston and a Bachelor of Science from Brigham Young University. He is married to LaCinda Smoot. They have eight children and 18 grandchildren. The family has lived in Gilbert for 30 over years.

In addition to his mayoral duties, Lewis also served on the Arizona League of Cities Executive Committee, Maricopa Association of Government Regional Council, MAG Economic Development Committee (past chair), Phoenix-Mesa Gateway Airport Board, Greater Phoenix Economic Council Board, East Valley Partnership Board, Arizona BrainFood Executive Board, Care for Life Advisory Board and Ascenda Executive Board.

In 2018 John Lewis was called as President of the Cambodia Phnom Penh Mission for the Church of Jesus Christ of Latter-day Saints.

== See also ==
- List of mayors of Gilbert, Arizona
