= PBHS =

PBHS may refer to:

South Africa

- Pretoria Boys High School, founded in 1901 in Pretoria, Gauteng
- Pinetown Boys' High School, founded in 1955 in Pinetown, KwaZulu-Natal

United States

- Pompano Beach High School, founded in 1928 Pompano Beach, Florida
- Palm Bay Magnet High School, founded in the 1950s in Melbourne, Florida
- Philip Barbour High School, founded in 1963 in Barbour County, West Virginia
- Pine Bluff High School, in Pine Bluff, Arkansas
- Paint Branch High School, founded in 1969 Burtonsville, Maryland
- Poston Butte High School, founded in 2009 in San Tan Valley, Arizona
