= School District 43 =

A School District with the numbered designation of 43. Among them are:

- School District 43 Coquitlam, British Columbia
- Apache Junction Unified School District No. 43, Arizona
