= FUSD =

FUSD is an acronym used to refer to the following school districts:

- Flagstaff Unified School District
- Fontana Unified School District
- Fremont Unified School District
- Fresno Unified School District
- Florence Unified School District
