= Hudson Catholic High School =

Hudson Catholic High School may refer to:

- Hudson Catholic High School, now Hudson Catholic Regional High School (New Jersey)
- Hudson Catholic High School (Hudson, Massachusetts)
