= Jenn Daniels =

American politician

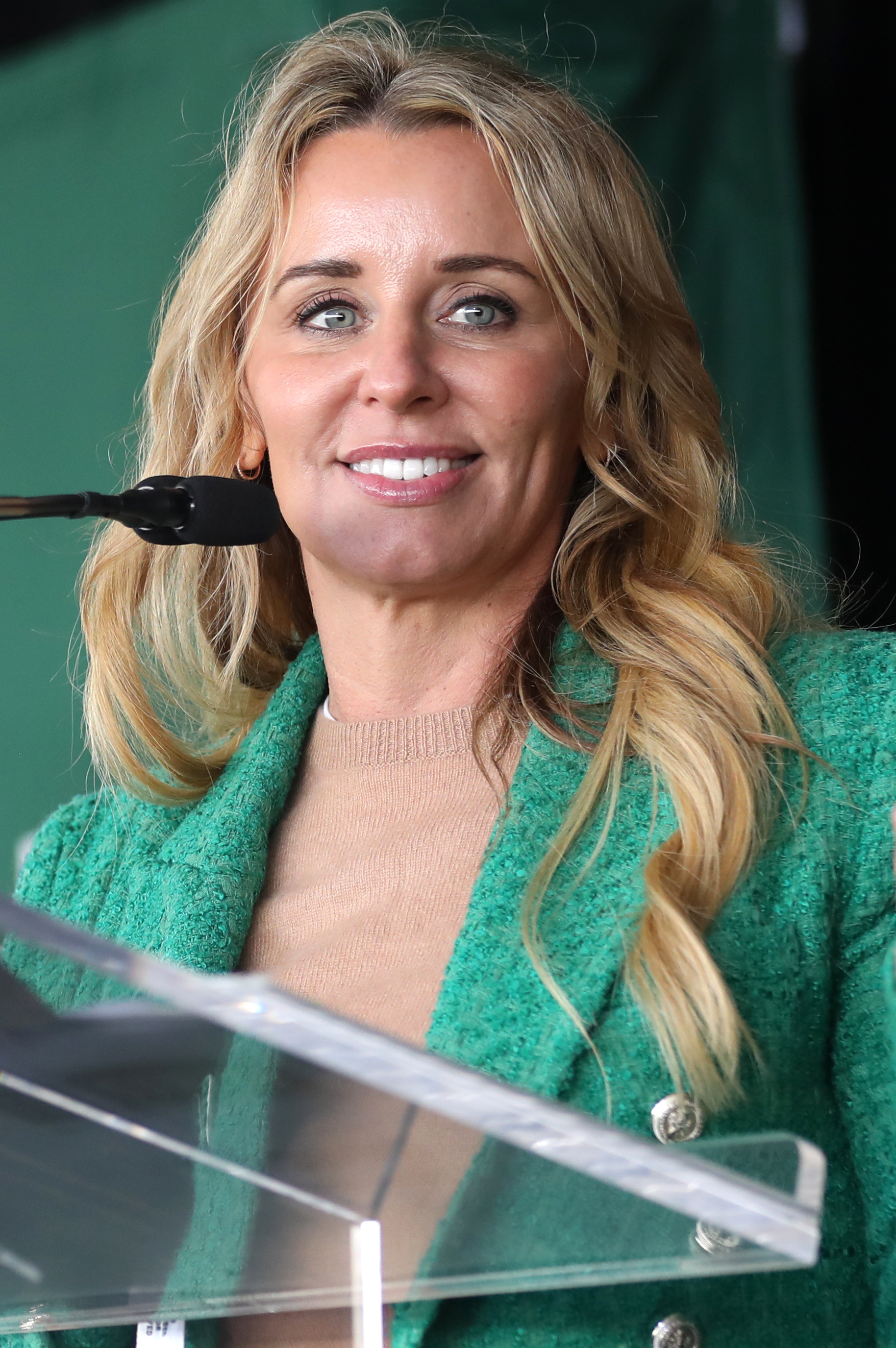
- Daniels in 2023

Mayor of Gilbert, Arizona
- In office August 2016 – August 11, 2020
- Preceded by: John Lewis
- Succeeded by: Brigette Peterson

Member of the Gilbert City Council At-large
- In office January 2009 – August 2016
- Succeeded by: Scott Anderson

Personal details
- Party: Republican
- Children: 4
- Profession: politician

Jenn Daniels is an American politician who first entered the political field in December 2008 when she filed to run for town council in Gilbert, Arizona. Early in her initial campaign Daniels came out against Big League Dreams (known as Cactus Yards as of 2019) in Gilbert by saying "I have no problem with public/private partnerships but the way Big League Dreams went down was absolutely devastating. It was a great idea but was done efficiently? No." In May 2009, after a runoff, Jenn Daniels emerged as the top of what started as a 7-person race for two seats on town council.

She served on town council from 2009–2016 and as vice-mayor from 2011–2012. She was elected to a four-year term as Mayor in August 2016. This opportunity came when John Lewis resigned his post to become president and CEO of East Valley Partnership. She was re-elected as mayor in November 8, 2016 and resigned for personal reasons on August 11, 2020. Councilmember Scott Anderson was appointed by a 7-0 vote of the City Council as interim mayor.

Daniels has served on many regional boards including the Maricopa Association of Governments Regional Council, the Regional Transportation Policy Committee, the League of Cities and Towns and the Phoenix-Mesa Gateway Airport Authority.

== See also ==
- List of mayors of Gilbert, Arizona
