= Hudson Catholic High School (Massachusetts) =

Location
- 198 Main Street; Hudson, (Middlesex County), Massachusetts 01749; United States; 42°23′31″N 71°33′48″W

Information
- Type: Private, Coeducational
- Motto: Esse Quam Videri (To be rather than to seem)
- Religious affiliation: Roman Catholic
- Established: 1959
- Closed: 2009
- Principal: Caroline Flynn
- Grades: 9–12
- Enrollment: 120 (2008-2009)
- Colors: Green and White
- Athletics conference: Colonial Athletic
- Mascot: Green Wave
- Accreditation: New England Association of Schools and Colleges
- Admissions Director: Kathy Peters
- Athletic Director: Robert Raymond
- Website: http://www.hudsoncatholic.net

Hudson Catholic High School (HCHS) was a coeducational Catholic high school in Hudson, Massachusetts, United States. It was within the Roman Catholic Archdiocese of Boston. The school was founded in 1959. On March 29, 2009, parents and students were told that the high school would close in June, after graduating its fiftieth class. On June 4, 2009, the school officially closed. The former Hudson Catholic High School building was demolished in 2015.

== History ==
Hudson Catholic High School was founded and built in 1959. The school's motto was Esse Quam Videri, a Latin phrase which translates as, To be rather than to seem. The school was owned and administered by the Roman Catholic Archdiocese of Boston, through St. Michael Roman Catholic Parish. Alumni may still request their academic transcripts from the parish. HCHS served grades 9 through 12. Its sister school St. Michael's Elementary School—also under the auspices of St. Michael Parish and later housed in the Hudson Catholic High School building—served grades 1 through 8.

In 1991 the Boston Archdiocese barred then Massachusetts Lieutenant Governor Paul Cellucci, a 1966 HCHS alumnus, from giving the school's commencement address because of Cellucci's position favoring abortion rights.

In 1997 the school community fund-raised more than $100,000 to build an elevator, making the building handicapped-accessible.

In 2002 the then principal of Hudson Catholic High School said the school's small class sizes drew parents and students, claiming, "Every student becomes a person rather than someone lost in the hallways." At the time, the school enrolled 216 students and planned for a new building.

In 2004 the school had 217 students, 18 teachers, and a full set of 14 varsity sports teams.

In May 2007, the school graduated 38 students. Both the salutatorian and valedictorian of the class planned to attend Boston University on four-year, full-tuition scholarships, having received the Cardinal Humberto Medeiros Scholarship, which Boston University awards annually to academic high-achievers from Boston archdiocesan high schools.

=== 2009 closing and 2015 demolition ===
For the 2008–2009 school year, the school enrolled 120 students, down from 200 in 2004. On March 29, 2009, parents and students were told that the high school would close in June. The archdiocese planned to move St. Michael's Elementary School to the building and site then used for the high school, starting in the 2009 fall semester.

Archdiocese Associate Superintendent Bill McKersie said the decision was due to decreasing enrollment, with only 15 incoming freshmen for the 2009 fall semester. Citing a projected budget deficit of $375,000 and declining enrollment, officials told parents and students that it would take $500,000 to keep the school alive in the first year and that the decision to close the school was final.

The former Hudson Catholic High School building housed St. Michael's Elementary School until that school also closed in 2011. The building was demolished in 2015.

== Athletics ==
In 1973 the Hudson Catholic football team competed in the first ever Eastern Massachusetts high school division IV Super Bowl, losing to Hanover 39–6. In 2004 the school fielded 14 varsity sports teams, including a boys' hockey program begun in 2000. Prior to 2000, HCHS had not fielded a hockey team since the mid-1980s. According to the athletic director, the school was losing prospective students to Central Massachusetts athletic power St. John's School and the nearby public high schools in Hudson and Marlborough because it did not have a hockey team. In 2004, more than 70% of Hudson's students participated in a varsity sport.

In August 2008, the school administration announced that it would no longer field a football team in the Colonial Athletic League. Between 15 and 20 students were playing in football games, compared to between 40 and 75 for opponents. The HCHS football team had won one game and lost nine the previous season. In addition, the school moved to a new division, 3A, in hockey; the school's hockey team went 0-18 the prior season, playing as a cooperative team with Joseph P. Keefe Technical High School.

== Notable people ==
- Paul Cellucci, 69th governor of Massachusetts
- Brigette Peterson, mayor of Gilbert, Arizona
