= Florence High School (Arizona) =

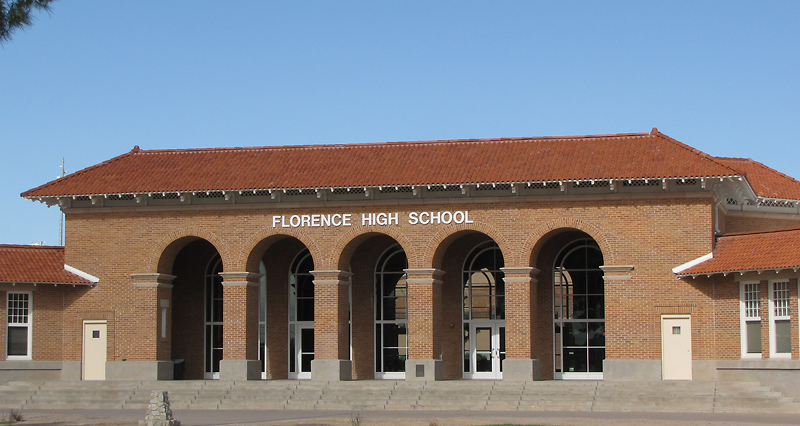

Location
- 1000 S Main St. Florence, Arizona 85132; United States

Information
- Type: Public High School
- School district: Florence Unified School District
- CEEB code: 030110
- Principal: Deanna Potter
- Staff: 44.33 (FTE)
- Grades: 9-12
- Enrollment: 842 (2023–2024)
- Student to teacher ratio: 18.99
- Colors: Red and white
- Mascot: Gophers
- Website: fhs.fusdaz.org
- Florence Union High School
- U.S. National Register of Historic Places
- Location within Arizona Location within the United States
- Coordinates: 33°1′21″N 111°23′16″W
- Area: Less than one acre
- Built: 1916
- Architect: Lescher & Kibbey
- Architectural style: Classical Revival
- MPS: Florence MRA
- NRHP reference No.: 87001306
- Added to NRHP: June 22, 1987

Florence High School is the high school for the town of Florence, Arizona. It is administered by the Florence Unified School District.

== History ==
Its current front building opened in 1916. It was designed by Lescher & Kibbey, Phoenix architects who "dominated the design of educational buildings in Arizona". The Neoclassical Revival structure incorporates elements of the Spanish Revival style popular in the region. A one-story design was chosen, as many students would have traveled several miles on foot or on horseback. The building's orientation helped to keep temperature in the rooms, cooling in the summer and heating in the winter. In addition, the area under the front arches once featured windows and doors that opened at the front and back of the auditorium, creating a cooling cross breeze.

The front building was listed on the National Register of Historic Places on June 22, 1987, for its architecture, as well as for its significance as "a well-preserved example of institutional architecture in the early statehood period of Arizona history". The original central entry was filled in, leaving nothing behind the arches. This was the case at the time of the NRHP nomination of this building in the Florence MRA. Since then, a central entry with windows and doors has been restored.
