= Brigette Peterson =

American politician

Mayor of Gilbert, Arizona
- In office January 12, 2021 – January 7, 2025
- Preceded by: Jenn Daniels
- Succeeded by: Scott Anderson

Personal details
- Political party: Republican

Brigette Peterson is an American politician who formerly served as the mayor of Gilbert, Arizona.

== Biography ==
Peterson is a 1982 graduate of Hudson Catholic High School in Hudson, Massachusetts. She moved to Gilbert in 1995 and in 2000 she applied and was appointed as an alternate for Gilberts planning commission. In 2014, she was one of seven candidates competing for four at-large seats on the Gilbert Town Council. Peterson was previously a member of town council and the town's planning commission. In 2013 the town of Gilbert honored Peterson with the Volunteer of the Year award. In 2018, she had served as the Vice-mayor of Gilbert, Arizona. Peterson was elected mayor in the 2020 election and has served since 2021. As a comparatively underfunded candidate, her campaign (during the COVID-19 pandemic) relied heavily on social media. In 2023 Peterson testified against a proposed state law that would strip cities of some zoning authority.

== See also ==
- List of mayors of Gilbert, Arizona
