= San Tan Foothills High School =

High school in San Tan Valley, Arizona

Coordinates: 33.138311°N 111.580854°W

Location
- 1255 W. Silverdale Road; San Tan Valley, Arizona 85143; United States

Information
- School type: Public high school
- Established: 2009 (17 years ago)
- School district: Florence Unified School District
- CEEB code: 030623
- Principal: Steve Miller
- Teaching staff: 49.83 (FTE)
- Grades: 9–12
- Enrollment: 804 (2023–2024)
- Student to teacher ratio: 16.13
- Colors: Blue and silver
- Mascot: Sabercats
- Website: foothills.fusdaz.org

San Tan Foothills High School is a high school in San Tan Valley, Arizona. It is one of three high schools under the jurisdiction of the Florence Unified School District as of July 1, 2016.

== History ==
San Tan Foothills opened in 2009, around the time of the housing market crash and financial crisis. Designed for 1,500 students, into the mid-2010s it was home to 500. The Coolidge district had overbuilt in San Tan Valley; it built Mountain Vista Middle School and San Tan Heights Elementary School. In 2014, the Coolidge district closed Mountain Vista and moved its students and teachers to the San Tan Foothills campus.

In order to save significant costs for Coolidge, and make a third high school in the district (second in San Tan Valley) unnecessary, the Florence Unified School District voted to acquire CUSD's three San Tan Valley schools in 2015. The move was approved by voters in both districts in overwhelming margins that November.

The Florence Unified School District took control of the schools on July 1, 2016, and appointed Dr. Tim Richard as the new Principal. Dr. Richard implemented several changes that resulted in significant improvement to academics, school culture, and school facilities and enrollment grew from 400 students in 2016 to over 900 students by 2020.

In 2020, Dr. Richard resigned from his position and Steve Miller became the new Principal
