= San Tan Valley, Arizona =

Town in Pinal County, Arizona

- Town
- Location in Pinal County and Arizona

- Location within Arizona Location within the United States
- Coordinates: 33°10′13″N 111°34′20″W
- Country: United States
- State: Arizona
- County: Pinal
- Incorporation: September 17, 2025

Area
  - Total: 75.79 sq mi (196.30 km^{2})
  - Land: 75.79 sq mi (196.30 km^{2})
  - Water: 0 sq mi (0.00 km^{2})
- Elevation: 1,493 ft (455 m)

Population (2020)
  - Total: 99,894
  - Estimate (2022): 103,000
  - Density: 1,359/sq mi (524.7/km^{2})
- Time zone: UTC–7 (Mountain (MST) (no DST))
- ZIP Codes: 85140, 85142, 85143, 85144
- Area code: 480
- FIPS code: 04-64210
- GNIS feature ID: 2629370
- Sales tax: 6.7%
- Website: www.santanvalley.gov

San Tan Valley is a town in northern Pinal County, Arizona, United States. The population was 99,894 at the 2020 census. Proposition 495, a measure to incorporate San Tan Valley as a municipality, passed in 2025. It is one of the most recently incorporated cities in the country.

== History ==
San Tan Valley derives its name from the nearby San Tan Mountains. San Tan Valley was picked as the name for the area based on an informal public poll commissioned by now former Pinal County Supervisor Bryan Martyn. Previously referred to as San Tan Heights, San Tan Foothills, Greater San Tan and simply the San Tan Area, the community lacked any official name and residents used nearby Queen Creek for their mailing addresses. This practice led to confusion, as the Town of Queen Creek is located primarily in neighboring Maricopa County. To coincide with the addition of a new ZIP Code for the community on July 1, 2009, the United States Postal Service was petitioned to provide the area with a new name. As part of the initial request, "Bella Vista" name was submitted to the postal service, drawing the ire of some local residents who opposed the suggested name. In response, the Greater San Tan Area Coalition organized a non-binding vote on June 23, offering residents the opportunity to vote on a name for the community.

The area, which had consisted primarily of undeveloped desert and agriculture prior to 2000, experienced considerable growth in the early part of the decade. As early as 2004, attempts to incorporate the area were underway. An initial attempt, which proposed a name of simply "San Tan" for the area, was blocked by the neighboring town of Florence after rural residents there expressed concern that allowing incorporation would accelerate the urbanization of the area. A subsequent effort in 2005 failed to gain traction. Following the renaming of the area in 2009, a renewed effort at incorporation sought to put the issue to a vote in 2010, this time with the support of Pinal County. The Town Council of Florence unanimously rejected a resolution that would have approved San Tan Valley's proposed boundaries over concerns of their allotment of state shared revenue.

In 2025, a group of residents filed a petition to incorporate San Tan Valley as a town. A proposition was then submitted to the residents of San Tan Valley, who approved incorporation at an election on August 5. On September 17, 2025, the Pinal County government formally declared the town appointed.

== Geography ==
San Tan Valley is located in the area between the towns of Queen Creek to the north and west, and Florence to the south. The area is also bound by the San Tan Mountains Regional Park on the west and the Gila River Indian Community on the southwest. The area consists largely of planned communities, such as Pecan Creek South, San Tan Heights, Archer Meadows, and Johnson Ranch.

=== Climate ===
Situated east of the San Tan Mountains, the community is located in the Sonoran Desert. As such, it experiences the hot, arid summers and moderate winters that typify the area. According to the Köppen climate classification, San Tan Valley has a hot desert climate (abbreviated BWh).

Climate data for San Tan Valley, 1991–2020 simulated normals (1542 ft elevation)
Month	Jan	Feb	Mar	Apr	May	Jun	Jul	Aug	Sep	Oct	Nov	Dec	Year
Mean daily maximum °F (°C)	66.7 (19.3)	70.2 (21.2)	77.0 (25.0)	84.4 (29.1)	93.2 (34.0)	102.9 (39.4)	104.5 (40.3)	103.1 (39.5)	98.8 (37.1)	88.5 (31.4)	76.1 (24.5)	65.7 (18.7)	85.9 (30.0)
Daily mean °F (°C)	53.2 (11.8)	56.1 (13.4)	61.9 (16.6)	68.2 (20.1)	77.0 (25.0)	86.2 (30.1)	91.0 (32.8)	90.0 (32.2)	84.7 (29.3)	73.4 (23.0)	61.5 (16.4)	52.5 (11.4)	71.3 (21.8)
Mean daily minimum °F (°C)	39.7 (4.3)	42.3 (5.7)	46.8 (8.2)	52.2 (11.2)	60.6 (15.9)	69.4 (20.8)	77.4 (25.2)	77.0 (25.0)	70.7 (21.5)	58.3 (14.6)	47.1 (8.4)	39.6 (4.2)	56.8 (13.8)
Average precipitation inches (mm)	1.09 (27.81)	1.12 (28.43)	0.96 (24.48)	0.29 (7.48)	0.21 (5.34)	0.05 (1.39)	0.96 (24.41)	1.20 (30.55)	0.62 (15.75)	0.43 (10.92)	0.64 (16.19)	1.10 (27.83)	8.67 (220.58)
Average dew point °F (°C)	31.1 (−0.5)	31.6 (−0.2)	32.2 (0.1)	29.1 (−1.6)	32.4 (0.2)	36.1 (2.3)	54.1 (12.3)	57.7 (14.3)	51.3 (10.7)	39.2 (4.0)	32.5 (0.3)	30.9 (−0.6)	38.2 (3.4)
Source: Prism Climate Group

== Demographics ==
Historical population
Census	Pop.	Note	%±
2010	81,321		—
2020	99,894		22.8%
2022 (est.)	103,000	▲	3.1%
U.S. Decennial Census; 2020 Census

San Tan Valley CDP, Arizona – Racial composition Note: the US Census treats Hispanic/Latino as an ethnic category. This table excludes Latinos from the racial categories and assigns them to a separate category. Hispanics/Latinos may be of any race.
Race (NH = Non-Hispanic)	% 2020	% 2010	Pop 2020	Pop 2010
White alone (NH)	61.8%	66.2%	61,784	53,831
Black alone (NH)	4.7%	4.7%	4,672	3,824
American Indian alone (NH)	0.9%	0.9%	893	698
Asian alone (NH)	1.8%	2%	1,813	1,666
Pacific Islander alone (NH)	0.3%	0.3%	313	221
Other race alone (NH)	0.4%	0.2%	433	140
Multiracial (NH)	4.5%	2.4%	4,473	1,946
Hispanic/Latino (any race)	25.5%	23.4%	25,513	18,995

=== 2020 census ===
As of the 2020 census, there were 99,894 people. The racial and ethnic composition of the population was 68.7% white, 5.0% black or African American, 1.4% Native American, 1.9% Asian, 0.4% Pacific Islander, 13.4% two more or races, 9.3% reporting some other race. The population was 25.4% Hispanic or Latino (of any race).

=== 2010 census ===
As of the 2010 census, there were 81,321 people. The racial and ethnic composition of the population was 66.2% non-Hispanic white, 5.0% black or African American, 1.2% Native American, 2.1% Asian, 0.3% Pacific Islander, 0.2% non-Hispanic reporting some other race and 23.4% Hispanic or Latino.

== Education ==
San Tan Valley is serviced by the following school districts. Each district has its own high school located within San Tan Valley:

- Florence Unified School District (Poston Butte High School, San Tan Foothills High School))
- J. O. Combs Unified School District (Combs High School)

== Emergency services ==
- Pinal County Sheriff's Office
- Rural Metro Fire

== Transportation ==
San Tan Valley does not have any public transportation service.
