= List of U.S. municipalities established or dissolved since 2020 =

This article will list cities, towns, villages, and other municipal government units incorporated or disincorporated in the United States on or after January 1, 2020.

== Incorporated since 2020 ==
Place	County	State	Date incorporated	Notes
French Island	La Crosse County	Wisconsin	May 22, 2026	The unincorporated town of Campbell voted 1,493–30 to incorporate as the village of French Island.
Ogden Valley City	Weber County	Utah	January 2, 2026	Ogden Valley City voted 2,927–1,597 to incorporate in November 2024.
Goodwill Township	St. Louis County	Minnesota	December 22, 2025	First new township in Minnesota in two decades.
Spring Lake	Utah County	Utah	December 18, 2025	Spring Lake voted 229–117 to incorporate in November 2024.
Kilpatrick	DeKalb County	Alabama	October 14, 2025	Community voted to incorporate in March 2025.
San Tan Valley	Pinal County	Arizona	September 17, 2025	
Bloomington	Victoria County	Texas	June 2, 2025	Voted 187–60 to incorporate in May 2025.
Starbase	Cameron County	Texas	May 20, 2025	Headquarters of Elon Musk's SpaceX.
Mulberry	Gwinnett County	Georgia	January 1, 2025	
Baldwin	Sherburne County	Minnesota	July 16, 2024	Incorporated from Baldwin Township.
Mountain House	San Joaquin County	California	July 1, 2024	First new city in California since 2011.
Diamondhead	Garland, Hot Spring	Arkansas	March 1, 2024	
Keystone	Summit County	Colorado	February 8, 2024	
Greenleaf	Brown County	Wisconsin	April 5, 2024	
Pine Level	Autauga County	Alabama	September 26, 2023	
Rib Mountain	Marathon County	Wisconsin	July 21, 2023	
Mableton	Cobb County	Georgia	June 1, 2023	
Victoria Woods	Warrick County	Indiana	April 2023	
Empire	Dakota County	Minnesota	February 28, 2023	
Lisbon	Waukesha County	Wisconsin	February 13, 2023	
Hochatown	McCurtain	Oklahoma	December 7, 2022	
Lake Point	Tooele	Utah	November 21, 2022	
Essex Junction	Chittenden County	Vermont	July 1, 2022	Separated from Essex, Vermont.
Erda	Tooele County	Utah	January 3, 2022	
Gluckstadt	Madison County	Mississippi	June 6, 2021	
Cherokee Ridge	Autauga County	Alabama	May 26, 2021	
Credit River	Scott	Minnesota	May 11, 2021	
Cahokia Heights	St. Clair County	Illinois	May 6, 2021	Merger of Alorton, Cahokia, and Centreville.
Greenville	Outagamie County	Wisconsin	January 12, 2021	
Ellinger	Fayette County	Texas	December 10, 2020	
Poetry	Hunt County; Kaufman County	Texas	November 24, 2020	Voted to incorporate in 1984, but election was invalidated.
Holiday Island	Carroll County	Arkansas	December 3, 2020	
Vernon	Waukesha County	Wisconsin	June 4, 2020	
Waukesha (village)	Waukesha County	Wisconsin	May 12, 2020	
Brighton	Salt Lake County	Utah	January 1, 2020	Voted to incorporate in 2018.

=== Communities approved incorporation ===
Place	County	State	Date incorporating	Notes
Hope Hull	Montgomery County	Alabama	TBD	The community is seeking to limit the influence of the city of Montgomery, which is considering annexing Hope Hull. The community voted to incorporate July 14, 2026, with 150 residents in favor to 8 against. Following the incorporation vote, a survey must be conducted to ensure that the community meets the minimum number of 300 residents to incorporate.

=== Communities seeking incorporation ===
Place	County	State	Election date	Notes
West Hills	Summit County	Utah	November 3, 2026	Incorporation failed 57–13.
Niwot	Boulder County	Colorado	November 3, 2026	Currently a census-designated place; population of 4,306 at the 2020 census. Incorporation failed 2,121–738.
Edgewood	Harford County	Maryland	N/A	Population of 25,713 at the 2020 census. Effort dead until at least 2027, only five cities have incorporated in Maryland since 1954.
La Jolla	San Diego	California	N/A	Proposed detachment from the City of San Diego would include 14,000 residents and 38 square miles.

== Disincorporated since 2020 ==
Place	County	State	Date disincorporated	Population (2020 Census)	Notes
Hillsview	McPherson County	South Dakota	TBD	2	Population 0 as of 2023, disincorporation scheduled.
Swan	Marion County	Iowa	TBD	76	Swan voted 20–14 to disincorporate on September 9, 2025.
Callimont	Somerset County	Pennsylvania	January 1, 2026	53	Callimont voted to merge with Larimer Township in 2024.
South New Castle	Lawrence County	Pennsylvania	January 1, 2026	649	South New Castle voted to merge with Shenango Township in 2023.
Monterey	Owen County	Kentucky	May 20, 2025	112	Administratively dissolved under KRS 81.062.
Poplar Hills	Jefferson County	Kentucky	May 20, 2025	380	Administratively dissolved under KRS 81.062.
Vicco	Perry County, Knott County	Kentucky	May 20, 2025	327	Administratively dissolved under KRS 81.062.
South Park View	Jefferson County	Kentucky	May 20, 2025	0	Administratively dissolved under KRS 81.062.
Glen Lyn	Giles County	Virginia	February 1, 2025	95	Glen Lyn voted 27–7 to disincorporate.
East Keating Township	Clinton County	Pennsylvania	January 1, 2025	9	Merged into Noyes Township.
Bonnieville	Hart County	Kentucky	December 8, 2024	269	Bonnieville voted 67–60 to disincorporate.
Aquilla	Geauga County	Ohio	November 19, 2024	305	Voted 106-43 to dissolve at the 2024 general election.
Glen Echo Park	St. Louis County	Missouri	February 8, 2024	122	Absorbed by Normandy.
Wheatland	Mercer County	Pennsylvania	January 1, 2024	578	Wheatland voted to merge with Hermitage in November 2022.
Fort Johnson	Montgomery County	New York	December 31, 2023	401	
Drew Plantation	Penobscot County	Maine	July 1, 2023	26	Dissolution failed by a single vote in the 2000s.
Sunny Side	Spalding County	Georgia	May 3, 2023	203	Now a census-designated place.
Lent Township	Chisago County	Minnesota	December 29, 2023	3,091	Disincorporated and absorbed by Stacy.
Lyndonville	Caledonia County	Vermont	July 1, 2023	1,136	Merged with Lyndon.
Ranger	Gordon County	Georgia	May 3, 2023	107	Now a census-designated place. The town had not held elections since 2005.
Florence Lake Township	Burleigh County	North Dakota	January 1, 2023	6	Dissolved into Florence Lake Unorganized Territory.
Lima Township	Cass County	Minnesota	January 1, 2023	396	
Clear Lake	Sangamon County	Illinois	December 7, 2022	203	Clear Lake voted 36–2 to disincorporate.
Time	Pike County	Illinois	December 1, 2022	29	
Madison Town	Dane County	Wisconsin	October 31, 2022	6,277	Merged into Madison City and Fitchburg.
Matoaka	Mercer County	West Virginia	October 5, 2022	173	
Hardinsburg	Washington County	Indiana	September 8, 2022	222	
Churchs Ferry	Ramsey County	North Dakota	September 1, 2022	9	Impacted by the expansion of Devils Lake. Churchs Ferry voted 5–1 to disincorporate in 2022, a disincorporation vote failed 2–5 in 2012.
Henderson	Mason County	West Virginia	August 11, 2022	231	Dissolved by the Mason County Commission.
Blackey	Letcher County	Kentucky	July 19, 2022	109	
St. Charles	Lee County	Virginia	July 1, 2022	72	Charter revoked by the state after no candidate filed to run in two subsequent municipal elections.
East Laurinburg	Scotland County	North Carolina	June 30, 2022	345	Charter revoked by the state due to failing finances.
Preston Village	Richardson County	Nebraska	June 1, 2022	19	
South Nyack	Rockland County	New York	March 31, 2022	2,699	
Rome	Adams County	Ohio	March 23, 2022	83	Now a census-designated place. Rome had not had any elected officials since 1995.
Hepburn	Page County	Iowa	March 2022	26	Voted to dissolve after no residents ran for mayor or city council in the 2021 municipal elections.
Pine Valley	Camden County	New Jersey	January 1, 2022	21	Merged into the Borough of Pine Hill.
South Creek Township	Jones County	South Dakota	October 19, 2021	—	Dissolved into North Jones Unorganized Territory.
Jerome	Drew County	Arkansas	October 14, 2021	24	
Magalloway Plantation	Oxford County	Maine	July 1, 2021	45	
West Peoria Township	Peoria County	Illinois	May 10, 2021	—	West Peoria Township voted 1,159–817 to disincorporate in November 2020 and was absorbed by West Peoria City.
Alorton	St. Clair County	Illinois	May 6, 2021	1,566	Merged to form the new municipality of Cahokia Heights.
Cahokia	St. Clair County	Illinois	May 6, 2021	12,096	Merged to form the new municipality of Cahokia Heights.
Centreville	St. Clair County	Illinois	May 6, 2021	4,232	Merged to form the new municipality of Cahokia Heights.
Atomic City	Bingham County	Idaho	December 2, 2020	41	
Buffalo Chip	Meade County	South Dakota	November 10, 2020	7	Incorporation voided by the South Dakota Supreme Court due to not meeting resident number requirements.
Cedar Highlands	Iron County	Utah	September 28, 2020	99	Cedar Highlands voted 73-12 to disincorporate. Formally incorporated in 2018.
Bethel Heights	Benton County	Arkansas	August 21, 2020	3,015	Merged into Springdale.
Weeki Wachee	Hernando County	Florida	June 9, 2020	16	
Pioneer	Humboldt County	Iowa	August 12, 2020	4	
Perkinsville	Windsor County	Vermont	July 1, 2020	108	Merged into Weathersfield.

=== Municipalities with pending or unsuccessful disincorporation ballot measures ===
Place	County	State	Date of election	Population (2020 Census)	Notes
Sand Lake	Kent County	Michigan	May 5, 2026	522	Voted 55%–45% to disincorporate, but failed to reach the two-thirds threshold required.
Baroda	Berrien County	Michigan	November 3, 2026	875	Failed.
Twin Lakes	Freeborn County	Minnesota	November 3, 2026	134	Twin Lakes will merge into Nunda Township if the measure is successful.
Wood River Township	Custer County	Nebraska	TBD	324	Township government became inactive on January 1, 2025, but has yet to officially dissolve.

== Other changes since 2020 ==
Place	County	State	Date changed	Population (2020 Census)	Notes
Frederick	Rice County	Kansas	January 1, 2025	8	City marked as inactive by the Census Bureau. Subject of two separate ballot measures to dissolve, both failures.
Hoberg	Lawrence County	Missouri	January 1, 2025	48	Village marked as inactive by the Census Bureau.
Lewisville	Monroe County	Ohio	January 1, 2025	184	Village marked as re-activated by the Census Bureau after a local government was elected.
Copperton Metro Township	Salt Lake County	Utah	May 1, 2024	829	All metro townships in Salt Lake City, which were formerly towns, were reverted to municipality status.
Emigration Canyon Metro Township	Salt Lake County	Utah	May 1, 2024	1,466	All metro townships in Salt Lake City, which were formerly towns, were reverted to municipality status.
Kearns Metro Township	Salt Lake County	Utah	May 1, 2024	36,723	All metro townships in Salt Lake City, which were formerly towns, were reverted to municipality status.
Magna Metro Township	Salt Lake County	Utah	May 1, 2024	29,251	All metro townships in Salt Lake City, which were formerly towns, were reverted to municipality status.
White City Metro Township	Salt Lake County	Utah	May 1, 2024	5,522	All metro townships in Salt Lake City, which were formerly towns, were reverted to municipality status.
