= Mercy Gilbert Medical Center =

- Dignity Health
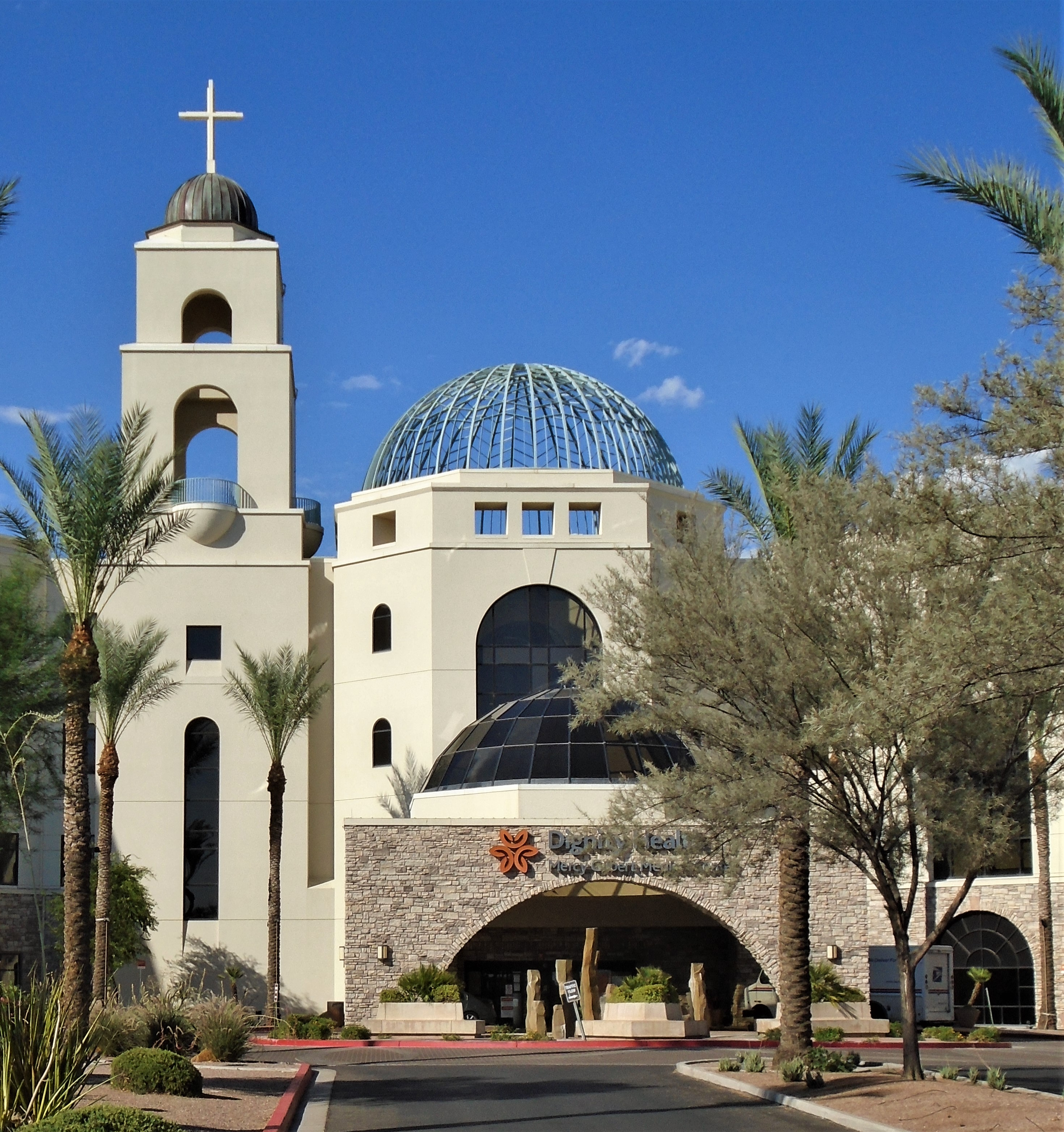

Geography
- Location: 3555 S Val Vista Dr, Gilbert, 85297, Arizona, United States
- Coordinates: 33°17′14″N 111°45′07″W

Organization
- Care system: Private
- Type: Community

Services
- Beds: 197

History
- Founded: June 5, 2006

Links
- Website: www.dignityhealth.org/arizona/locations/mercygilbert
- Lists: Hospitals in Arizona

Mercy Gilbert Medical Center is a full-service, 197-bed Catholic hospital in Gilbert, Arizona, United States. The hospital is owned by Dignity Health.

Mercy Gilbert opened in 2006 to provide health care in the rapidly growing Gilbert area. It was the first full-service and second hospital to open in Gilbert, which previously had no hospitals of its own. A tower under construction at Mercy Gilbert will house a branch of Phoenix Children's Hospital, in which Dignity Health holds a minority stake.

== History ==
In 2003, two companies presented plans for hospitals in the same general area of Gilbert, Arizona, along the under-construction Santan Freeway. Catholic Healthcare West (CHW) presented its proposal for a 120-bed facility, while Banner Health was also considering a hospital in the area. Approved in November 2003 as the Gilbert Medical Campus, CHW named the facility the Mercy Gilbert Medical Center in acknowledgement of the Sisters of Mercy, co-sponsors of the system's hospitals. By the time construction was under way in 2004, Banner had abandoned its plans for a nearby facility. Construction workers had to plow over alfalfa fields and chase off sheep in the previously agricultural area.

The first phase of Mercy Gilbert Medical Center opened on June 5, 2006, a week before the Santan Freeway extension to Val Vista Road opened. It was Gilbert's first full-service hospital and the second in the town overall, after the Gilbert Emergency Hospital, which opened its doors four months prior. It had 88 beds, with plans already under way to continue expansion. The campus, built at a cost of $152.5 million, also included a four-story medical office building. Population growth in the region at the time was such that CHW's Chandler Regional Hospital saw little relief in its emergency room caseload after Mercy Gilbert, just 10 minutes further east on the freeway, opened. After an expansion in 2009, the hospital had 206 beds. In 2012, CHW changed its name to Dignity Health.

In 2017, Dignity Health and Phoenix Children's Hospital (PCH)—in which Dignity owns a 20-percent stake—announced plans to build a new tower at Mercy Gilbert to house a branch of Phoenix Children's Hospital with a 50-bed pediatric wing—including a Level III-B neonatal intensive care unit—as well as 24 rooms for labor and delivery, to be administered as part of Mercy Gilbert. Previously, the hospital had opened a pediatric unit in 2008, only to close it in 2011 due to underutilization and the agreement with PCH. Known as Phoenix Children's Hospital–East Valley, the facility forms part of a regional expansion into satellite facilities on the edges of the Valley by the children's hospital. Originally scheduled to open in 2023, it was not in service as of May 2024.

=== Living toddler in morgue incident ===
In February 2026, an 18 month toddler who was found floating in the family's pool was rushed to Mercy Gilbert Medical Center. The toddler was declared dead 16-minutes after arrival and taken to the hospital's morgue awaiting transfer to medical examiner. A worker found the toddler breathing nearly five hours later. Death was declared by Dr. Aryan Toosi. Police bodycam footage shows family members and police telling hospital staff toddler showing signs of breathing. Blood gas test result was used by Toosi to justify not taking the infant's body core temperature and skipping warning measures. The toddler continues to experience medical issues in October 2026. He is unable to walk and has to be fed through a tube.
