= J. O. Combs Unified School District =

School district in Pinal County, Arizona

Location
- Pinal County, Arizona United States
- Coordinates: 33.2198°N 111.5609°W

District information
- Type: Public School district
- Grades: PreK–12
- Established: 1958; 67 years ago

Other information
- Website: www.jocombs.org

The J. O. Combs Unified School District is a public school district in Pinal County, Arizona in San Tan Valley. The district also serves a small part of eastern Queen Creek, Arizona located within Pinal County.

Dr. Gregory A. Wyman, superintendent of the school district, announced the closing of its schools for Monday, August 17, 2020, including virtual learning, due to insufficient staffing. Reuters reported that Wyman "received an overwhelming response from staff indicating that they do not feel safe returning to classrooms with students", and that other schools, in "Tennessee, Georgia, and Alabama closed this week as students and staff were infected with COVID-19".

== History ==
The first public school in the area began to form in 1949, and by 1954, barracks from Phoenix's Osborn School District had been acquired and placed at the site. In 1958, it finally broke away from the Apache Junction Unified School District. The district was named for a Mr. J. O. Combs, who donated five acres of land to the district in the early 1950s.

The elementary school district remained rural and grew slowly. But it kept expanding: a cafeteria was added in the 1960s, several older structures (including some demolished by storms) were replaced, and a new well and new junior high building were added in 1987.

In 2003, Kathryn Sue Simonton Elementary School opened, marking the first modern elementary school in the district. All Combs USD students attended the new site. New schools quickly opened after that: Jack W. Harmon Elementary in 2005, Ellsworth Elementary and a new JO Combs Middle School in 2007, and Ranch Elementary in 2008. An alternative Combs Traditional Academy opened in 2010.

In 2006, the voters in the district approved its unification. While the district didn't actually unify with anything, the move gave the newly renamed J.O. Combs Unified School District authority to operate a high school. Combs High School opened in 2009.

== Schools ==
There are five elementary schools, one middle school and one high school.

=== High schools ===
- J.O. Combs High School

=== Middle schools ===
- J.O. Combs Middle School

=== Elementary schools ===
- Jack W. Harmon Elementary
- Ellsworth Elementary
- Simonton Elementary
- Ranch Elementary
- Combs Traditional Academy
