= KVIT =

Radio station at the East Valley Institute of Technology in Chandler, Arizona

- Chandler, Arizona; United States
- Broadcast area: Phoenix metropolitan area
- Frequency: 88.7 MHz
- Branding: 88.7 The Pulse

Programming
- Format: High school radio

Ownership
- Owner: East Valley Institute of Technology

History
- First air date: August 11, 2015
- Former call signs: KPNG (2015–2021)
- Call sign meaning: From "EVIT", acronym of owner

Technical information
- Licensing authority: FCC
- Facility ID: 173984
- Class: C3
- ERP: 15,000 watts
- HAAT: 121.0 meters (397.0 ft)
- Transmitter coordinates: 33°00′14″N 111°58′53″W

Links
- Public license information: Public file; LMS
- Webcast: Listen live
- Website: 887thepulse.com

KVIT (88.7 FM) is a radio station licensed in Chandler, Arizona, United States. KVIT is licensed to the East Valley Institute of Technology. Its studios are located at EVIT's main facilities in Mesa, while the transmitter is to the south near Maricopa. The station is branded as "88.7 The Pulse".

== History ==
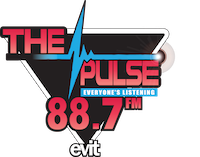
Previous logo

The station was originally licensed to the Arizona Community Media Foundation, then-operator of Radio Phoenix. In early 2015, AZCMF sold the station to the East Valley Institute of Technology, which already owned KVIT (90.7 FM) in Apache Junction, for $700,000.

On August 11, 2015, KPNG came to air and replaced KVIT and its then-translator K224CJ. While EVIT maintained ownership of KVIT for another six years, K224CJ, which was independently owned the whole time, now carries KAZG AM 1440. In 2021, EVIT sold the Apache Junction facility to Desert Soul Media, Inc., which had acquired Radio Phoenix earlier in the year; when the sale closed on December 9, the KVIT call letters remained with EVIT and were placed on 88.7, while 90.7 became KRDP.

== Programs ==
Programming on KVIT is largely produced by EVIT students and local DJs, though there are exceptions, such as AIA-produced high school football telecasts. From its sign-on until 2022, it mainly focused on Top 40 music with a rhythmic lean, but after founding radio instructor Steve Grosz left EVIT, the format started to pivot towards alternative rock. Effective 2023, the station leans CHR, but also plays popular tracks from the classic rock, alternative rock, and hip hop genres.

As of 2025, a variety of genres and topics have been added via specialty-show programming. Shows that are currently running on a weekly basis include The Basshuis, hosted by Brandon Neyenhuis, which focuses on EDM and house music; The Pulse Sports Triple Play with Matthew Cavazos, a show focused on Major League Baseball and the Arizona Diamondbacks; and The Junk Drawer hosted by Matthew Cavazos, Jackson Wolfmeyer, and Mariana Perez Cervantes, a show with ever-changing themes and topics jumping from genre to genre as the colloquialism indicates.

Several shows have been nominated or won John Drury Awards. These include multiple sports talk programs, such as the Pulse Sports Connection hosted by Adam Beadle and Jason Richey; and The Adam Beadle Sports Show, hosted by Adam Beadle, which won Best Sports Talk Show in 2024.

=== Radio Phoenix ===
88.7 FM airs three shows originating from community station Radio Phoenix (operated by former KPNG permittee Arizona Community Media Foundation from 2008 to 2021; now operated by Desert Soul Media, Inc.). These are The Althea Long Show (reggae and Caribbean music), My World of Music (reggae and world music), and Full Moon Hacksaw (traditional jazz and blues).
