= Florence Unified School District =

School district in Arizona, United States

Address
- 1000 South Main Street Florence, Arizona, 85132; United States

District information
- Type: Public
- Grades: PreK–12
- NCES District ID: 0402920

Students and staff
- Students: 8,918
- Teachers: 504.97
- Staff: 619.63
- Student–teacher ratio: 17.66

Other information
- Website: fusdaz.org

The Florence Unified School District is a school district serving grades PreK-12 in Florence and San Tan Valley, Arizona.

== Elementary Schools ==
FUSD elementary schools serve grades K-5.

- Anthem Elementary
- Circle Cross Ranch Elementary
- Copper Basin Elementary
- Florence Elementary
- Magma Ranch Elementary
- San Tan Heights Elementary
- Skyline Ranch Elementary

== Middle Schools ==
FUSD middle schools serve grades 6-8

- San Tan Mountain Middle School (7-8)
- Florence Middle School
- Walker Butte Middle School

== High Schools ==
FUSD high schools serve grades 9-12

- Florence High School
- San Tan Foothills High School
- Poston Butte High School.

== Alternative Schools ==
- Florence Virtual Academy
- Mountain Vista Academy
