= Apache Junction High School =

Location
- 2525 S. Ironwood Drive; Apache Junction, Arizona 85120; United States

Information
- School type: Public high school
- School district: Apache Junction Unified School District
- CEEB code: 030003
- Principal: Lisa Ginn
- Staff: 45.90 (FTE)
- Grades: 9-12
- Enrollment: 864 (2023-2024)
- Student to teacher ratio: 18.82
- Colors: Vegas gold and black
- Mascot: Prospectors
- Website: ajhs.ajusd.org

Apache Junction High School is a high school in Apache Junction, Arizona under the jurisdiction of the Apache Junction Unified School District.

== Notable alumni ==
- Elaine Herzberg – First pedestrian killed by a self-driving car
