= Poston Butte High School =

Location
- 32375 North Gantzel Road; San Tan Valley, Arizona 85143; United States; 33°10′24″N 111°32′40″W

Information
- Type: Public High School
- School district: Florence Unified School District
- CEEB code: 030690
- Principal: Eddie Lopez
- Staff: 69.83 (FTE)
- Grades: 9–12
- Enrollment: 1,423 (2023–2024)
- Student to teacher ratio: 20.38
- Colors: Orange and blue
- Mascot: TUFF The Bronco
- Website: pbhs.fusdaz.org

Poston Butte High School is a high school in San Tan Valley, Arizona in the Florence Unified School District. It opened July 20, 2009.

== One-to-one computing ==
Poston Butte High School does not employ textbooks. Instead, the school's one-to-one computing policy provides a laptop to each student in lieu of textbooks.

The first school to use one-to-one computing in Arizona was Empire High School, which started doing so in 2005. Florence district officials worked with Empire to implement a similar program at Poston Butte in 2009. After successful implementation at Poston Butte, it was expanded to Florence High School in 2010.

== First graduating class ==
The first class graduated from Poston Butte on May 30, 2012. It had 253 students.
