= Combs High School =

Location
- 2505 East Germann Road; San Tan Valley, Arizona 85140; United States; 33°16′37″N 111°32′21″W

Information
- School type: Public high school
- Established: 2009 (17 years ago)
- School district: J. O. Combs Unified School District
- CEEB code: 030630
- Principal: Tayna Loftis
- Teaching staff: 58.60 (FTE)
- Grades: 9–12
- Enrollment: 1,243 (2023–2024)
- Student to teacher ratio: 21.21
- Colors: Red, black, and silver
- Mascot: Coyote
- Website: chs.jocombs.org

Combs High School is a high school in San Tan Valley, Arizona. It is the only high school in the J. O. Combs Unified School District. It has arts, theater, orchestra, and band departments.

The J.O. Combs district community had to approve a unification vote in November 2006 for the district to be able to teach high school students.

In 2009, it opened with Brenda Mayberry as the principal. The first graduating class was the class of 2012.
