= East Valley Partnership =

Regional coalition

The East Valley Partnership is a regional coalition of community, business, educational and government leaders whose goal is to provide leadership and support in specific areas of focus, thereby improving business and quality of life in the region.

== About ==
The East Valley Partnership is a coalition of civic, business, educational and political leaders from Ahwatukee, Apache Junction, Carefree, Cave Creek, Chandler, Fort McDowell Yavapai Nation, Florence, Fountain Hills, Gila River Indian Community, Gilbert, Guadalupe, Mesa, Queen Creek, Salt River Pima-Maricopa Indian Community, Scottsdale, Sun Lakes, and Tempe dedicated to promoting economic development in the East Valley. The Partnership actively advocates in areas such as economic development; education; transportation and infrastructure; arts, behavioral health; and other important areas.

== History ==
In 1980, The Wall Street Journal noted that the East Valley of metropolitan Phoenix was one of the most vibrant growth centers in the United States, with extremely high residential and commercial market potential. Located on the periphery of Phoenix, the East Valley stood in the shadow of the superior political clout of Phoenix with little united strength to win government funding or allocations for the seven individual cities comprising the East Valley. In the spring of 1982, a group of influential business leaders held the first meeting to create guidelines for an aligned coalition that became the East Valley Partnership.

An executive committee was formed and appointed a selection committee to identify a list of influential leaders from the East Valley. The initial group was nonpartisan and represented the needs of the region. By early 1983, the East Valley Partnership had become a functioning body made up of legislators, city and county officials, business leaders and city leaders. Several primary concerns were identified. Among the concerns were transportation, court system decentralization, water, economic development, and human services.

While the East Valley Partnership was originally conceived as a small, restricted group of top leaders, today it has broadened to include leading individuals from all areas of business, education, government and civic enterprise united as an entity representing the interests of the East Valley. The East Valley Partnership, recognizing that more can be accomplished by working together, now regularly collaborates with Phoenix, the western portion of the Valley and Pinal County leaders in a wide range of issues.

== East Valley Profile ==
The East Valley of Greater Phoenix, Arizona comprises fifteen communities and is one of the most dynamic regions in the country with record-growth since 1980. In fact, there has been almost one million new residents since the 1990 census. The East Valley currently has nearly 655,000 households in its trade area, and is expected to grow to nearly 736,000 households by 2015. This unprecedented growth has resulted in the following: Young, higher income residents; a culture that values education; high educational attainment; an influx of a highly skilled and talented workforce; a consumer base of over $36 billion; over 62,000 business establishments; science and research-based companies; and new infrastructure and transportation networks.

Civic leaders, policymakers, business leaders, and educational leaders collaborate on economic development and preparation for global competition.

== Gateway to the East Valley Magazine ==
Since March 2010, East Valley Partnership has published Gateway to the East Valley magazine, a quarterly publication that exists to promote the economic development and quality of life of one of the most vibrant growth centers in the U.S. It highlights notable events in business, education, healthcare, technology, tourism, aviation and aerospace. The magazine is partnered with the East Valley Tribune, a newspaper that has served the East Valley for over 100 years. Gateway to the East Valley is distributed to community leaders and elected officials, businesses, medical facilities, retail stores, college and university campuses, libraries, hotels, airports, golf courses, health clubs and other high-traffic areas throughout Chandler, Gilbert, Mesa, Tempe, Queen Creek, Apache Junction, Fountain Hills, Scottsdale, Ahwatukee, Carefree, Cave Creek, Fort McDowell Yavapai Nation, Florence, Gila River Indian Community, Guadalupe, Salt River Pima-Maricopa Indian Community and Sun Lakes. The magazine is also available online at www.eastvalleygateway.com
