= Apache Junction Unified School District =

School district in Arizona, United States

Location
- 1575 West Southern Ave Apache Junction, Arizona 85120 United States
- Coordinates: 33.3929°N 111.5626°W

District information
- Type: Public
- Motto: Kids First
- Grades: Pre K-12
- Established: 1952
- Superintendent: Dr. Robert Pappalardo
- School board: 5 members
- Schools: 7
- Budget: $33,974,000 (2016-17)
- NCES District ID: 0400790

Students and staff
- Students: 3404
- Teachers: 161
- Staff: 402
- Student–teacher ratio: 21.14

Other information
- Website: www.ajusd.org

The Apache Junction Unified School District is a school district in Apache Junction, Arizona, additionally serving the town of Gold Canyon and Queen Valley. It was formed in 1952 and serves 3404 students at three elementary schools, one K-5 classical academy, one pre-school, one middle school, and one high school.

== Schools ==
• The Early Learning Center (Pre-School)

• The Classical Academy at Superstition Mountain (Classical K-5)

• Desert Vista Elementary School (Leadership K-5)

• Four Peaks Elementary School (Dual Language K-5)

• Peralta Trail Elementary School (STEM K-5)

• Cactus Canyon Junior High (AVID 6-8)

• Apache Junction High School (CTE 9-12)

== Governing Board ==
• Dena Kimble (President)

• Cami Garcia (Vice-President)

• Sandra Leen

• Judy Williamson

• Gail Ross
