= Gilbert, Arizona =

Town in Maricopa County, Arizona

- Town
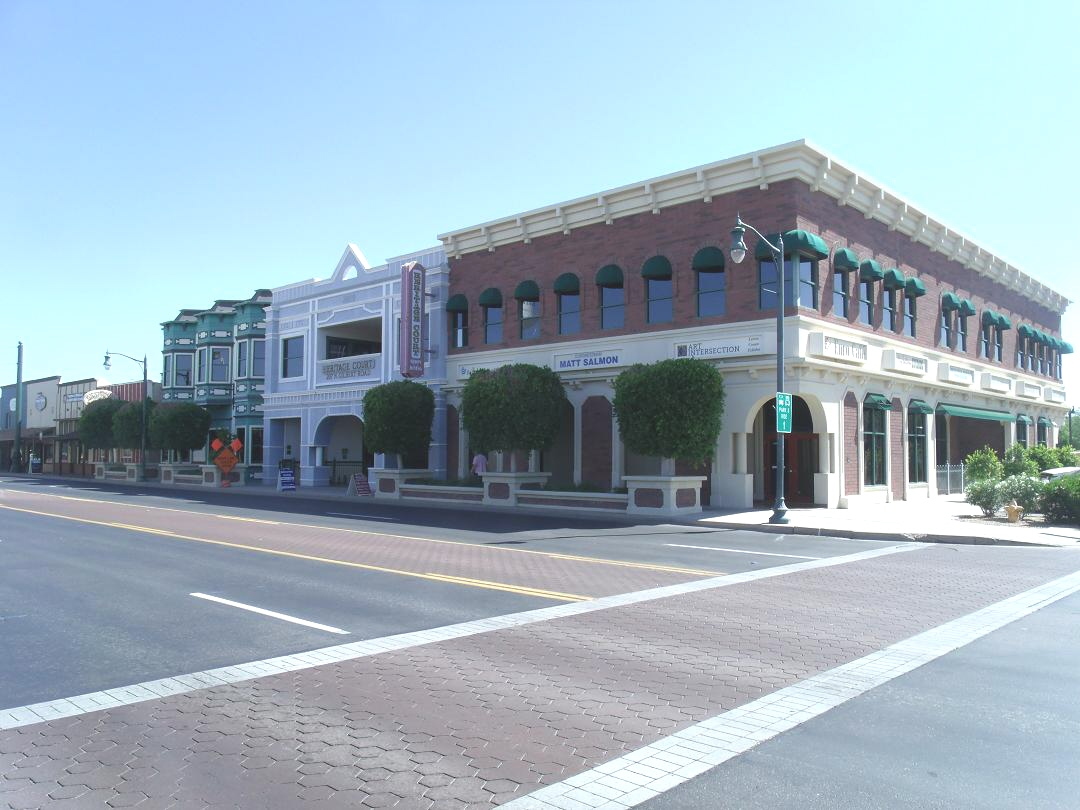
- Gilbert's Heritage Court as viewed from Gilbert Road

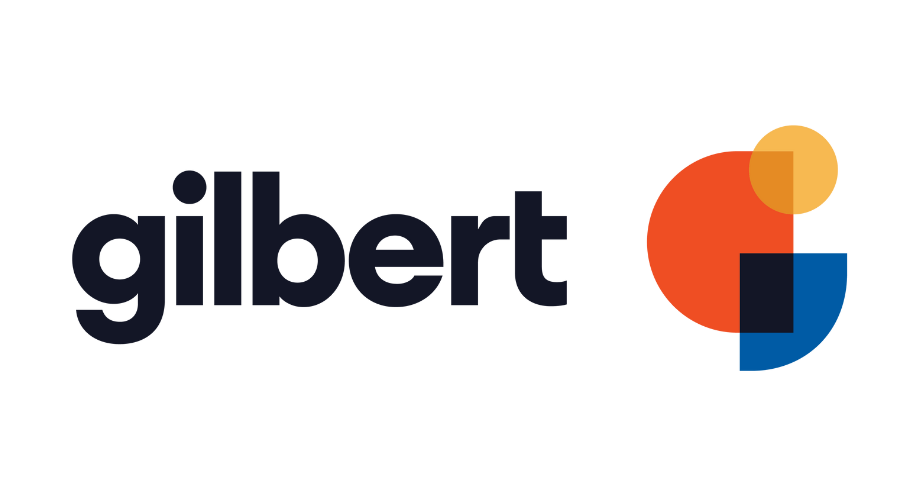
- Flag Seal Logo
- Motto(s): "Gilbert: Clean, Safe, Vibrant"
- Location in Maricopa County, Arizona
- Coordinates: 33°21′10″N 111°47′20″W
- Country: United States
- State: Arizona
- County: Maricopa
- Founded: 1891
- Incorporated: July 6, 1920
- Named after: William "Bobby" Gilbert

Government
  - Mayor: Scott Anderson

Area
  - Total: 68.86 sq mi (178.35 km^{2})
  - Land: 68.66 sq mi (177.84 km^{2})
  - Water: 0.20 sq mi (0.53 km^{2})
- Elevation: 1,237 ft (377 m)

Population (2020)
  - Total: 267,918
  - Estimate (2025): 287,285 ▲
  - Rank: US: 76th AZ: 5th
  - Density: 4,010/sq mi (1,549/km^{2})
- Time zone: UTC–7 (Mountain (MST) (no DST))
- ZIP Codes: 85233, 85234, 85295, 85296, 85297, 85298, 85299
- Area code: 480
- FIPS code: 04-27400
- GNIS feature ID: 0005032
- Sales tax: 7.8%
- Website: gilbertaz.gov

Gilbert is a town in Maricopa County, Arizona, United States. Located southeast of Phoenix, Gilbert had a population of 287,285 as of 2025. It is the fourth-most populous municipality in Arizona and is considered a suburb of Phoenix. Gilbert is the most populous incorporated town in the United States, and has been described as the “largest town in America.”

Incorporated on July 6, 1920, Gilbert was once known as the "Hay Shipping Capital of the World".

== History ==
Gilbert was established by William "Bobby" Gilbert, who provided land to the Arizona Eastern Railway in 1902 to construct a rail line between Phoenix and Florence, Arizona. Ayer's Grocery Store, Gilbert's first store, opened in 1910 and became the location of the first post office in 1912. The post office moved several times before settling on the east side of Gilbert Road in downtown, where it stands today. In 1912, many Mormons who had fled the Mormon colonies in Mexico due to the actions of Pancho Villa's forces settled in Gilbert. By 1915, they began holding church meetings at the Gilbert Elementary School. In 1918, they were organized into the Gilbert Ward.

Incorporated on July 6, 1920, Gilbert was primarily a farming community fueled by the rail line and construction of the Roosevelt Dam and the Eastern and Consolidated Canals. It remained an agricultural town for many years and was known as the "Hay Capital of the World" from 1911 until the late 1920s.

== Geography ==
Gilbert is in the southeastern Phoenix metropolitan area. It is south of Mesa, northeast of Chandler, and northwest of Queen Creek.

According to the United States Census Bureau, the town has an area of 68.86 square miles (178.35 km^{2}), of which 68.65 square miles (177.80 km^{2}) is land and 0.20 square miles (0.52 km^{2}) is water.

=== Climate ===
Gilbert has a hot arid climate (Köppen BWh) with sweltering summers, mild to warm winters with cold mornings, and little rainfall – although it typically receives somewhat more rain than does Phoenix.

Climate data for Gilbert, Arizona
| Month | Jan | Feb | Mar | Apr | May | Jun | Jul | Aug | Sep | Oct | Nov | Dec | Year |
|---|---|---|---|---|---|---|---|---|---|---|---|---|---|
| Record high °F (°C) | 89 (32) | 95 (35) | 99 (37) | 106 (41) | 118 (48) | 116 (47) | 119 (48) | 115 (46) | 113 (45) | 107 (42) | 97 (36) | 86 (30) | 119 (48) |
| Mean daily maximum °F (°C) | 67 (19) | 71 (22) | 77 (25) | 85 (29) | 94 (34) | 104 (40) | 106 (41) | 104 (40) | 99 (37) | 89 (32) | 75 (24) | 67 (19) | 87 (30) |
| Mean daily minimum °F (°C) | 41 (5) | 45 (7) | 49 (9) | 54 (12) | 61 (16) | 70 (21) | 77 (25) | 76 (24) | 70 (21) | 59 (15) | 47 (8) | 40 (4) | 57 (14) |
| Record low °F (°C) | 15 (−9) | 19 (−7) | 24 (−4) | 30 (−1) | 37 (3) | 43 (6) | 54 (12) | 51 (11) | 40 (4) | 30 (−1) | 22 (−6) | 17 (−8) | 15 (−9) |
| Average rainfall inches (mm) | 1.01 (26) | 1.03 (26) | 1.19 (30) | 0.33 (8.4) | 0.13 (3.3) | 0.04 (1.0) | 0.89 (23) | 1.14 (29) | 0.89 (23) | 0.81 (21) | 0.77 (20) | 0.98 (25) | 9.21 (235.7) |
Source: The Weather Channel

Climate data for Gilbert
| Month | Jan | Feb | Mar | Apr | May | Jun | Jul | Aug | Sep | Oct | Nov | Dec | Year |
|---|---|---|---|---|---|---|---|---|---|---|---|---|---|
| Mean daily daylight hours | 10.0 | 11.0 | 12.0 | 13.0 | 14.0 | 14.5 | 14.0 | 13.5 | 12.5 | 11.5 | 10.5 | 10.0 | 12.2 |
Source: Weather Atlas

== Demographics ==
Historical population
| Census | Pop. | Note | %± |
|---|---|---|---|
| 1920 | 865 | | — |
| 1930 | 791 | | −8.6% |
| 1940 | 837 | | 5.8% |
| 1950 | 1,114 | | 33.1% |
| 1960 | 1,833 | | 64.5% |
| 1970 | 1,971 | | 7.5% |
| 1980 | 5,717 | | 190.1% |
| 1990 | 29,188 | | 410.5% |
| 2000 | 109,697 | | 275.8% |
| 2010 | 208,453 | | 90.0% |
| 2020 | 267,918 | | 28.5% |
| 2025 (est.) | 287,285 | ▲ | 7.2% |
U.S. Decennial Census; 2020 Census

=== 2020 census ===
As of the 2020 census, there were 267,918 people, 88,896 households, and 69,603 families residing in the town. There were 93,230 housing units.

Gilbert town, Arizona – racial and ethnic composition Note: the US Census treats Hispanic/Latino as an ethnic category. This table excludes Latinos from the racial categories and assigns them to a separate category. Hispanics/Latinos may be of any race.
| Race / ethnicity (NH = Non-Hispanic) | Pop. 2000 | Pop. 2010 | Pop. 2020 | % 2000 | % 2010 | % 2020 |
|---|---|---|---|---|---|---|
| White alone (NH) | 87,597 | 151,930 | 178,671 | 79.85% | 72.88% | 66.69% |
| Black or African American alone (NH) | 2,515 | 6,606 | 9,601 | 2.29% | 3.17% | 3.58% |
| Native American or Alaska Native alone (NH) | 559 | 1,394 | 1,998 | 0.51% | 0.67% | 0.75% |
| Asian alone (NH) | 3,863 | 11,877 | 17,690 | 3.52% | 5.70% | 6.60% |
| Pacific Islander alone (NH) | 120 | 406 | 574 | 0.11% | 0.19% | 0.21% |
| Some other race alone (NH) | 111 | 264 | 1,211 | 0.10% | 0.13% | 0.45% |
| Mixed-race or multi-racial (NH) | 1,906 | 4,902 | 13,041 | 1.74% | 2.35% | 4.87% |
| Hispanic or Latino (any race) | 13,026 | 31,074 | 45,132 | 11.87% | 14.91% | 16.85% |
| Total | 109,697 | 208,453 | 267,918 | 100.00% | 100.00% | 100.00% |

=== 2010 census ===
As of the 2010 census, there were 208,453 people, 74,147 housing units, and 3.01 persons per household.

- Between 2000 and 2010, the town of Gilbert was the fastest-growing incorporated place among populations of 100,000 or more in the United States, with an increase of 90%.
- Fastest growing municipality in the United States from 1990 to 2003 (U.S. Census Bureau)
- 4th fastest growing municipality in the United States (U.S. Census Bureau – 2009)
- One of the top 25 safest cities in the United States
- 34.5% of Gilbert residents hold a bachelor's degree or higher.
- Highest household median income in the Phoenix Metropolitan Area with population 50,000+ (U.S. Census Bureau – 2005)

According to Nielsen's Claritas demographics, in 2009 the estimated racial makeup of the town was:

- 81.5% White
- 15.4% Hispanic or Latino
- 3.1% Black or African American
- 0.8% Native American
- 4.7% Asian
- 0.2% Pacific Islander
- 6.0% from other races
- 3.7% from two or more races

2009 estimated population data by gender/age:

- 31.37 average age male/female. By 2019, the average age was reported as 33.6.
- 50.2% male
  - 30.0 est. average age
- 49.8% female
  - 31.8 est. average age
- 37.1% population under 21
- 33.3% population under 18
- 70.0% population over 16
- 66.8% population over 18
- 62.9% population over 21
- 5.3% population over 65

2009 estimated population age 15+ by marital status:

- 20.9% never married
- 66.7% married, spouse present
- 2.2% married, spouse absent
- 2.1% widowed
- 8.1% divorced

2009 estimated population age 25+ educational attainment:

- 92.3% high school/GED or higher
- 37.5% bachelor's degree or higher. A 2019 report put the rate at close to 50% for residents over the age of 25.
- 10.5% master's degree or higher

2009 estimated household by household income:

- $109,213 average household income
- $89,077 median household income. Median income noted as >$87,000 in a report of 2013–2017 US Census data, as compared to a state-wide median of $53,000.
- $35,559 per capita income
- 2.3% of families were below the poverty level.

=== Religion ===
Various religious denominations are represented in Gilbert. The town has been known for its high population of members of the Church of Jesus Christ of Latter-day Saints, a fact evidenced by the building of the Gilbert Arizona Temple, which was dedicated on March 2, 2014.

== Economy ==
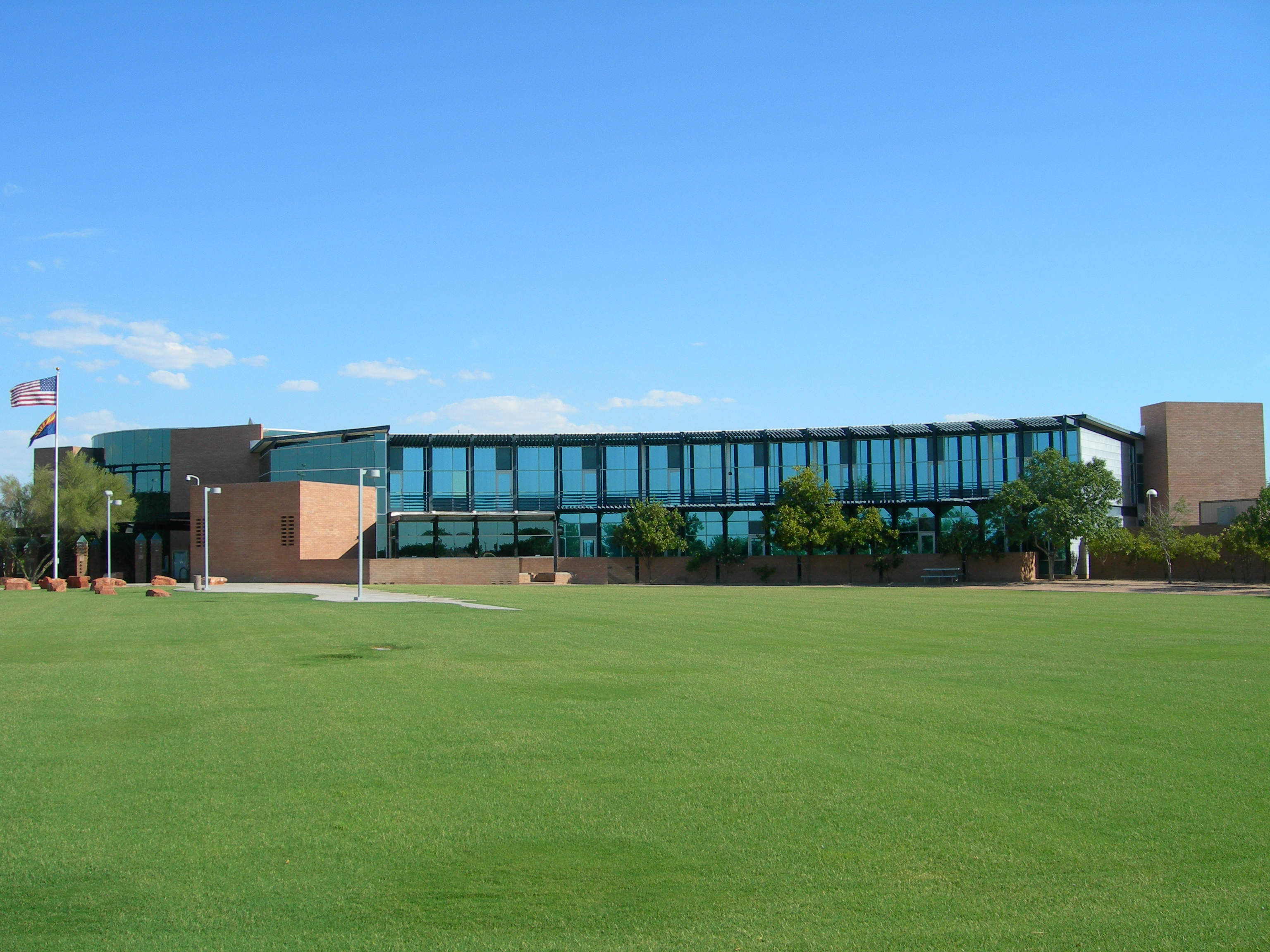
Town Hall building at the Civic Center

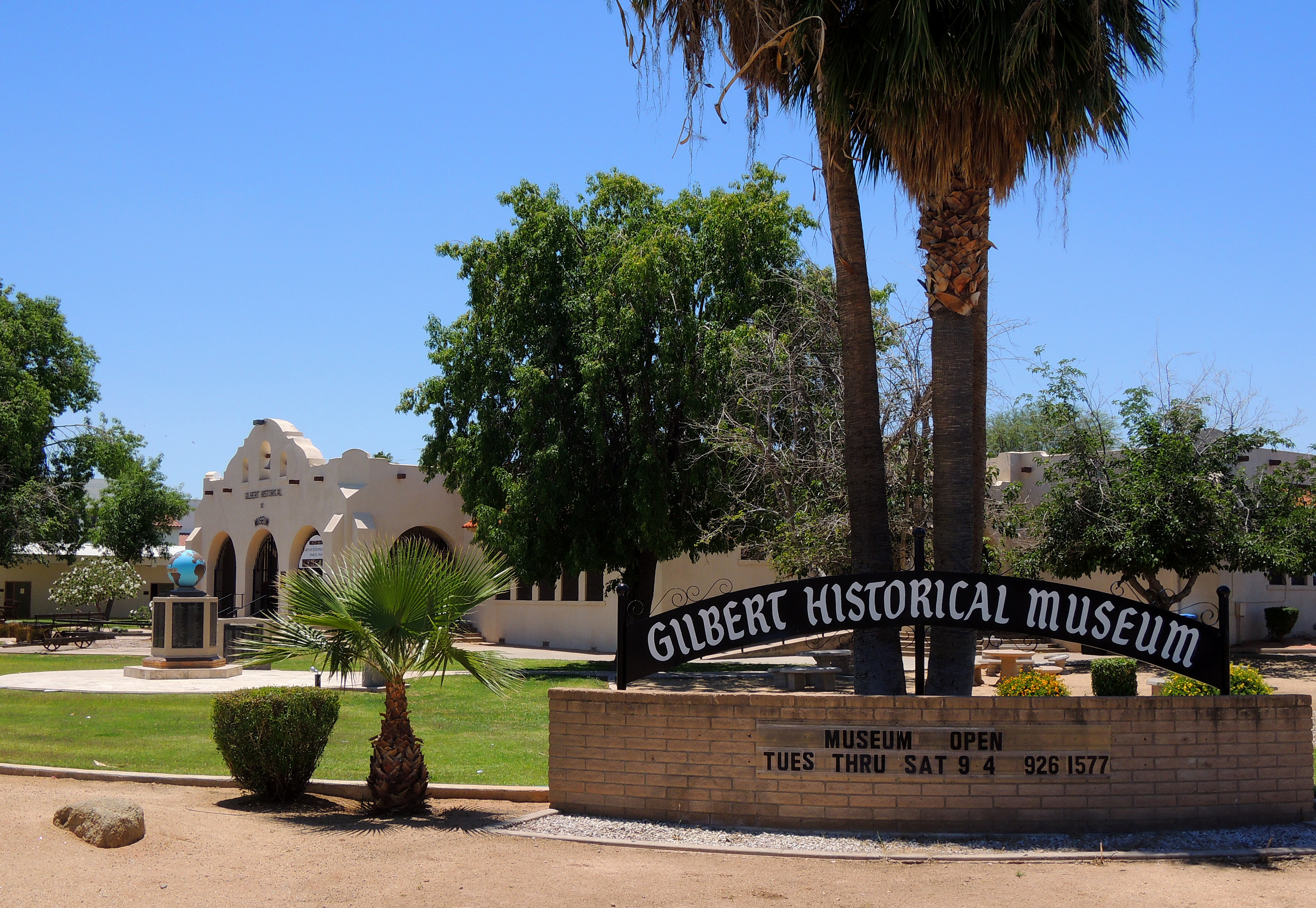
Gilbert Historical Museum

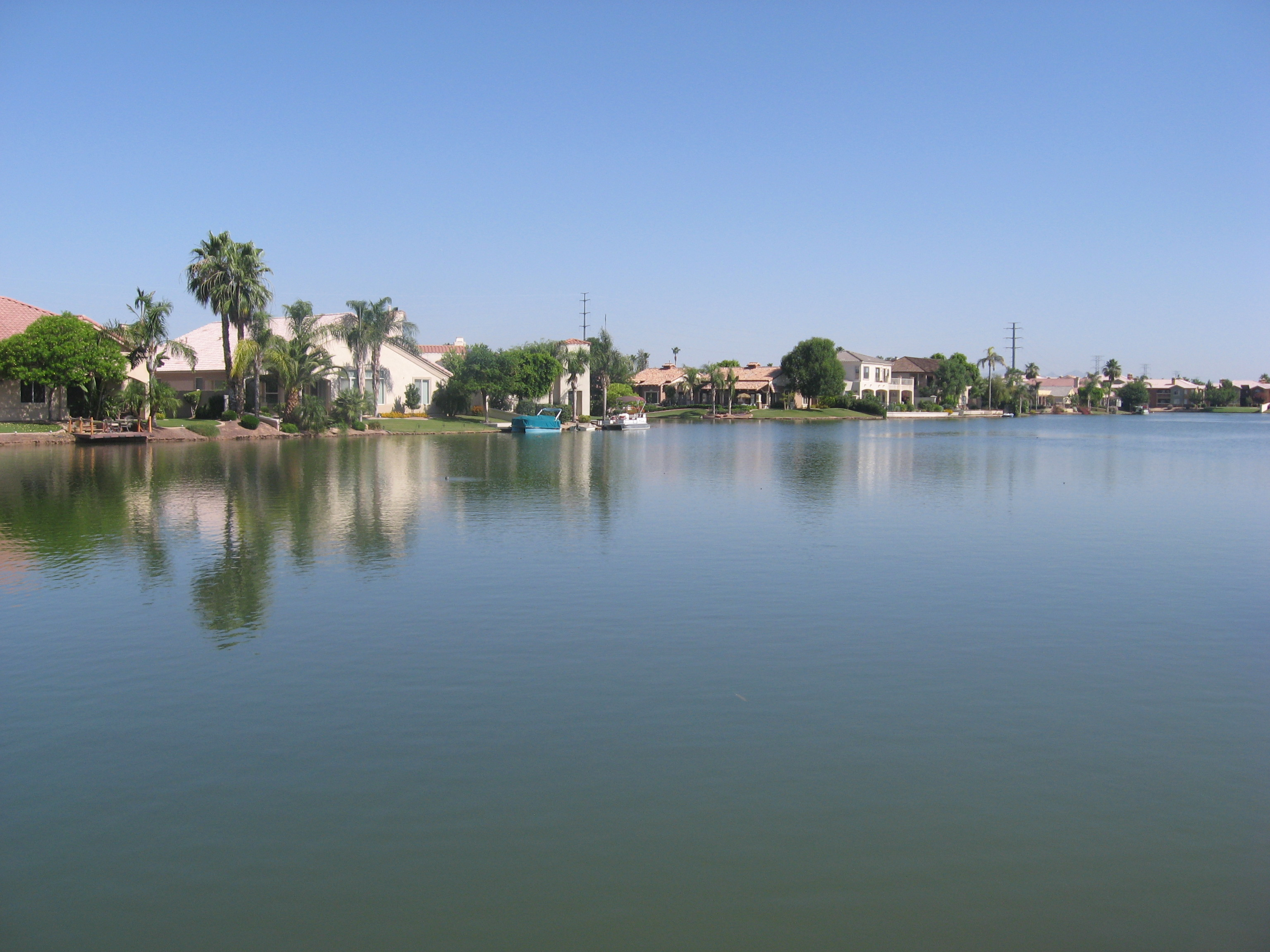
A waterfront in the Val Vista Lakes community in Gilbert

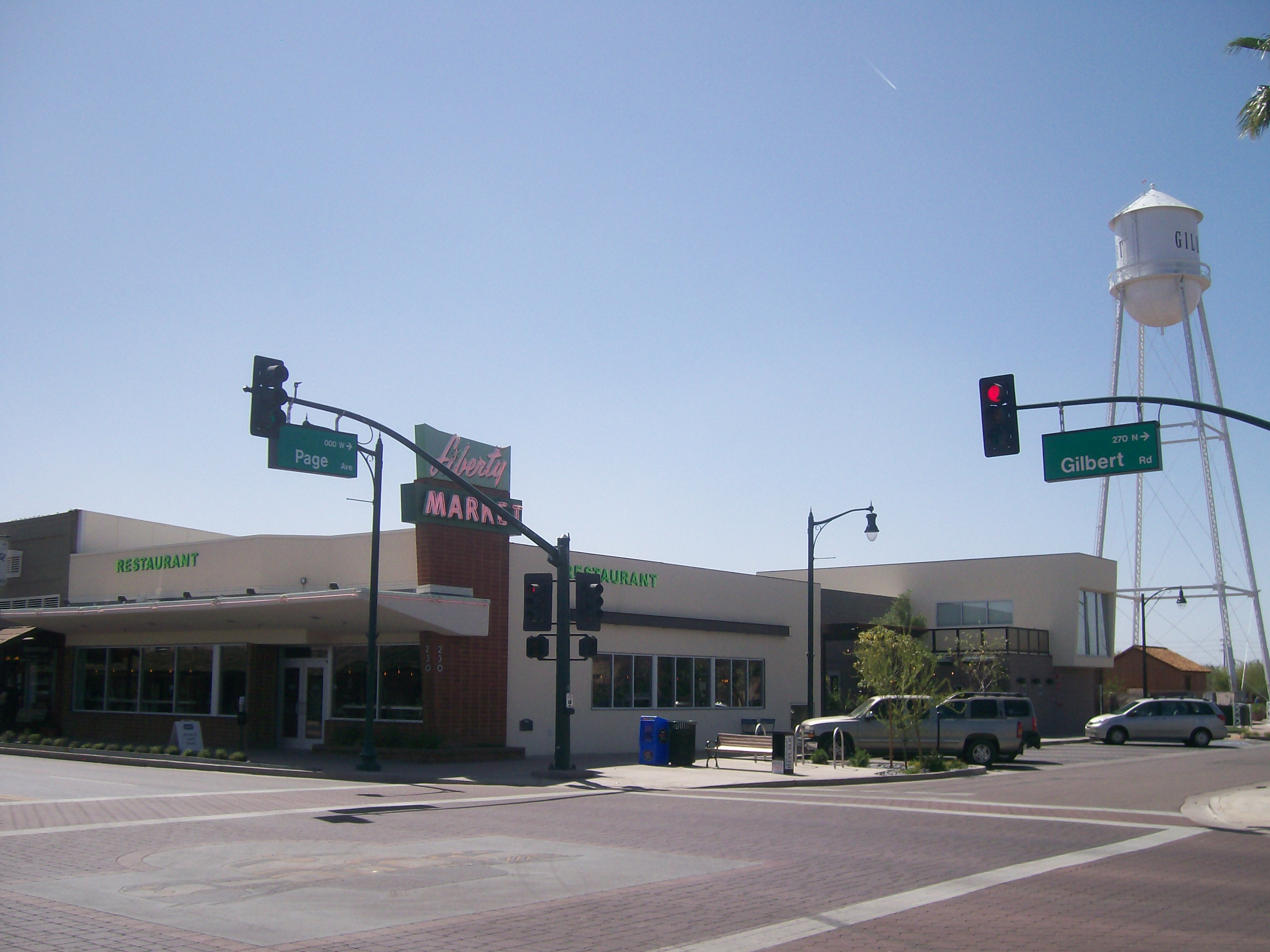
The Liberty Market with the Gilbert water tower (in background), pictured in March 2009

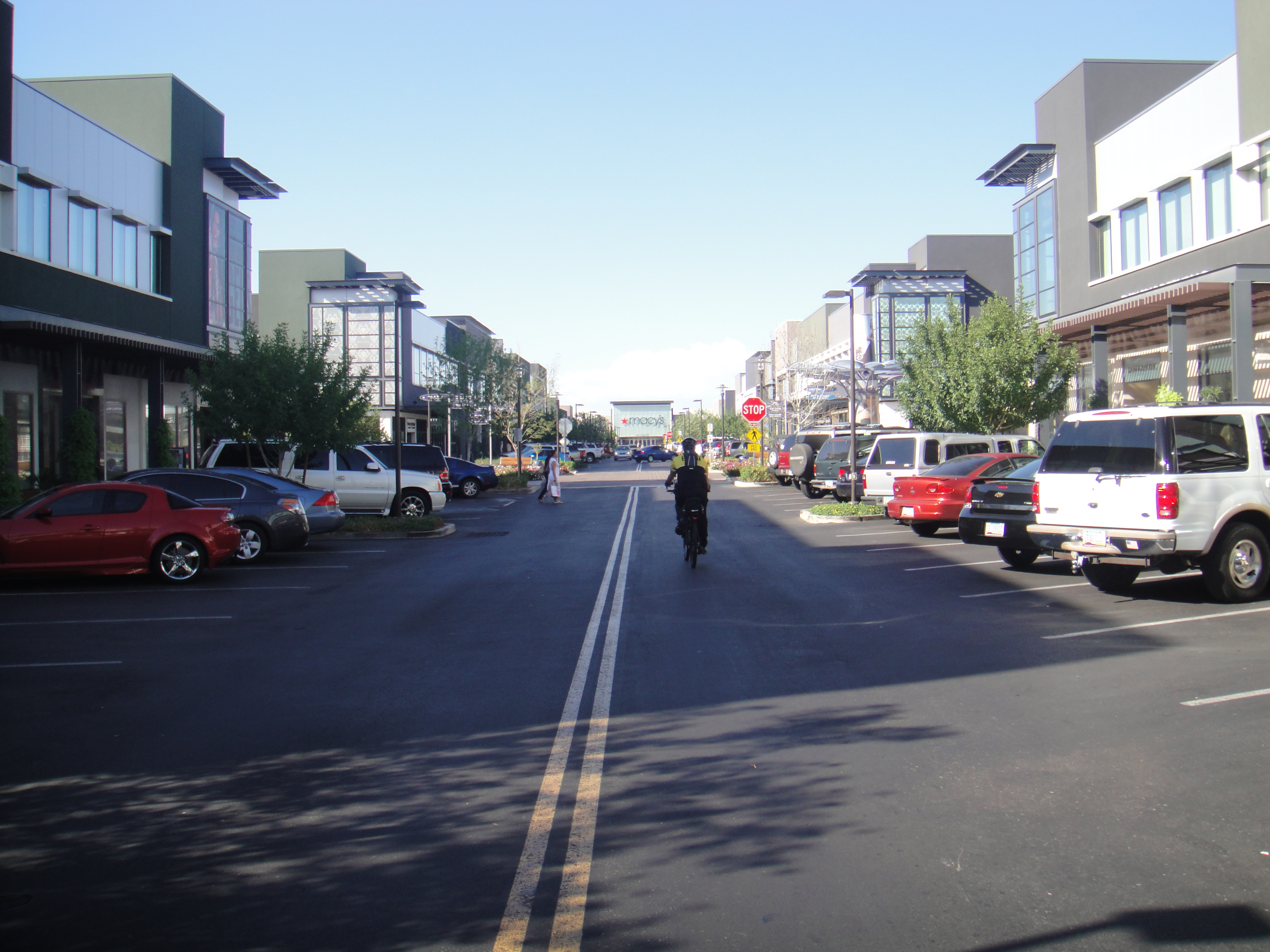
SanTan Village in September 2009

=== Largest employers ===
According to its 2023 Comprehensive Annual Financial Report, Gilbert's top employers are:

| # | Employer | # of employees |
|---|---|---|
| 1 | Gilbert Public Schools | 2,918 |
| 2 | Banner Health | 2,539 |
| 3 | Town of Gilbert | 1,815 |
| 4 | Fry's Food and Drug | 1,484 |
| 5 | Higley Unified School District | 1,296 |
| 6 | Northrop Grumman | 1,152 |
| 7 | Walmart | 1,111 |
| 8 | Dignity Health | 1,052 |
| 9 | Deloitte | 835 |
| 10 | Silent Aire USA | 778 |

== Arts and culture ==
The town's official tourism site, Discover Gilbert, highlights attractions for new and returning visitors. Sightseeing opportunities include the mural-clad brick walls, the color-changing water tower, waterways art, a solo gopher, and glowing benches. Gilbert also features the Hale Centre Theatre, historical museum, and gallery.

=== 9/11 Memorial ===
Gilbert Town Hall is home to a 9/11 Memorial that features an eight-foot steel girder beam that held up the North Tower of the World Trade Center. Former Gilbert Fire Chief Collin DeWitt raised money for three years to create the memorial and bring the beam from New York City to Arizona. He drove to collect it himself along with then Assistant Fire Chief Jim Jobusch.

The memorial's design angles the beam, putting it in reach of everyone. Four granite walls bear the names of those killed in the attacks. Concrete was poured in the shape of a pentagon for the memorial's foundation, and is surrounded by bricks that bear the names of some of those who donated to the memorial's creation. The memorial was unveiled in a ceremony on the attacks' 10th anniversary, on September 11, 2011.

=== Historic place ===
Gilbert Elementary School was built in 1913, and now houses the Gilbert Historical Museum. It is listed in the National Register of Historic Places.

== Parks and recreation ==
The Gilbert Parks and Recreation department provides parks, recreation, and cultural programs for residents and visitors. Gilbert has over 600 acres of open space, 37 park ramadas, four public pools, a riparian area, and over 40 sports fields. Gilbert Parks and Recreation is accredited by the Commission for Accreditation of Park and Recreation Agencies. It is also recognized as a Certified Autism Center by the International Board of Credentialing and Continuing Education Standards (IBCCES).

== Government ==
Since Gilbert remains incorporated as a town, it lacks the additional powers possessed by nearby Mesa and Chandler, which are incorporated as cities. For instance, Arizona towns do not have as much power to regulate utilities and construction within their borders as cities do. Unlike most of its neighboring communities, Gilbert is theoretically vulnerable to annexation.

The town is part of Arizona's 5th congressional district, which is represented by Republican and Gilbert resident Andy Biggs.

=== Mayors of Gilbert ===
Mayors of Gilbert, Arizona

| Image | Mayor | Years | Notes |
|---|---|---|---|
| | Everett R. Wilbur | July 16, 1920 – August 2, 1921 | |
| | E.R. Stoner | August 6, 1921 – November 1, 1921 | |
| | R.W. Merrell | November 7, 1921 – June 4, 1923 | |
| | Claude J. Cullumber | June 22, 1923 – June 1, 1925 | |
| | R.R. Creed | June 18, 1925 – June 7, 1927 | |
| | Walter W. Page | June 7, 1927 – June 7, 1937 | |
| | Ward C. Burk | June 10, 1937 – June 5, 1939 | |
| | Wayne McFrederick | July 10, 1939 – July 10, 1943 | |
| | Ward C. Burk | July 5, 1943 – July 4, 1945 | |
| | M.S. Vaughn | June 12, 1945 – June 9, 1947 | |
| | R.D. Hearne | June 25, 1947 – January 3, 1949 | |
| | Roy Fuller | February 7, 1949 – June 6, 1949 | |
| | Tom Clement | July 11, 1949 – June 13, 1955 | |
| | George Russell | June 16, 1955 – January 9, 1956 | |
| | Kenyon Udall | January 17, 1956 – June 8, 1959 | |
| | Morris Cooper | July 1, 1959 – June 12, 1967 | |
| | John Moore | July 5, 1967 – September 11, 1967 | |
| | Jack Smith | October 9, 1967 – June 9, 1969 | |
| | Vernon Gist | July 1, 1969 – June 14, 1971 | |
| | Dale Hallock | July 1, 1971 – June 14, 1976 | |
| | David Thompson | July 21, 1976 – August 11, 1978 | |
| | Ed Lane | August 22, 1978 – May 29, 1981 | |
| | L.J. Reed | June 2, 1981 – June 2, 1987 | |
| | James Farley | June 9, 1987 – June 6, 1989 | |
| | Steven Berman | June 13, 1989 – June 4, 1991 | |
| | Jo Albright | June 4, 1991 – April 28, 1992 | |
| | Wilburn Brown | May 26, 1992 – December 4, 1992 | |
| | Wilburn Brown | March 16, 1993 – June 10, 1997 | |
| | Cynthia Dunham | June 10, 1997 – June 12, 2001 | |
| | Steven Berman | June 12, 2001 – June 15, 2009 | |
| | John W. Lewis | June 16, 2009 – July 19, 2016 | |
| | Jenn Daniels | July 19, 2016 – August 18, 2020 | |
| | Scott Anderson | August 18, 2020 – January 12, 2021 | Appointed by a 7–0 vote of the city council after the resignation of Jenn Daniels |
| | Brigette Peterson | January 12, 2021 – January 7, 2025 | |
| | Scott Anderson | 2025 – incumbent | |

== Education ==
Most of Gilbert is zoned to schools in the Gilbert Public Schools, while other parts are zoned to districts including the Chandler Unified School District, Mesa Public Schools, and the Higley Unified School District. Also in Gilbert are charter schools such as Eduprize (the first charter school in Arizona), American Leadership Academy, and Legacy Traditional School. The town is also home to Gilbert Christian Schools, a chain of private schools. In 2018, Park University opened the Gilbert Campus Center after leasing 18,000-square-foot (1,700 m^{2}) at the University Building in the city's Heritage District.

== Infrastructure ==
=== Transportation ===
Gilbert is primarily served by one area freeway—the Santan Freeway portion of Loop 202. A small section of the US 60 Superstition Freeway also skirts Gilbert's northern boundary at the Higley Road interchange (Exit 186). Several regional arterials also serve the area, including Williams Field Road, Chandler Boulevard, and Gilbert Road. The town is relatively close to Phoenix Mesa Gateway Airport, in east Mesa, and is a 25-minute drive from Phoenix Sky Harbor International Airport.

A park-and-ride facility is in downtown Gilbert for bus service. Although the facility borders the Union Pacific (formerly Southern Pacific) tracks and has provisions for commuter rail service, there is currently no such service. Bus service is limited in Gilbert, with some north–south routes in Mesa dead-ending at Baseline Road before entering Gilbert. Routes that serve portions of Gilbert include the 108-Elliot Road, 112-Country Club/Arizona Avenue, 136-Gilbert Road, 140-Ray Road, 156-Chandler Boulevard/Williams Field Road, 184-Power Road, and 531-Mesa/Gilbert Express, with most of these routes operating at 30-minute frequency on weekdays. Sunday service is only available on Routes 108, 112, 156, and 184. Most people get around by car or bike. Gilbert has a low proportion of households without cars. In 2015, 1.9% of Gilbert households lacked a car, and the figure was 1.7% in 2016. The national average in 2016 was 8.7%. Gilbert averaged 2.08 cars per household in 2016, compared to a national average of 1.8.

In 2018 Waymo started testing in a small portion of Gilbert's northwest.

=== Health care ===
- Mercy Gilbert Medical Center
- Banner Gateway Medical Center (part of Banner Health)
- East Valley ER & Hospital

=== Public safety ===
The town of Gilbert operates the Gilbert Fire and Rescue Department, the Gilbert Police Department, and also owns a multi-purpose training facility which includes a shooting range, driving training course, and multiple burn buildings for firefighting training.

==== Gilbert Fire and Rescue Department ====
Emergency answering, dispatching, and mutual aid assignments are provided by the Mesa Fire Department Regional Dispatch Center (Some in Chandler, which is through Phoenix Fire Regional Dispatch) which distributes fire apparatus and personnel to an emergency from the nearest available station regardless of jurisdiction or municipal boundary as a part of a Regional Automatic Aid System.

The Gilbert Fire and Rescue Department is a ISO Class 1 Fire Department which is staffed by over 250 personnel and operates 11 stations consisting of 10 engines, three ladder trucks, one utility vehicle, six medics (ambulance), one hazardous materials vehicle, one water tender, one brush truck, and one command vehicle. The department was the first in the state of Arizona to implement the use of an electric fire engine.

==== Gilbert Police Department ====
The Gilbert Police Department (GPD) is a full-service accredited and certified police department with 373 full-time sworn personnel, 186 non sworn personnel, two stations, and six operational divisions: Patrol, Investigations, Traffic Enforcement, Canine, SWAT, and SRO. The department provides a Citizen Police Academy, Youth Leadership Academy, Youth Police Cadet program, community outreach, education, and volunteering programs including Citizens on Patrol, a crisis support team, a crime prevention team, and chaplain.

== Notable people ==
- Jim Bechtel, professional poker player; World Champion of Poker in 1993; lives in Gilbert
- Andy Biggs, U.S. representative; former Arizona state senator and state representative
- Christina Birch, professional track cyclist, scientist, NASA astronaut; member of the US track cycling team at the 2020 Summer Olympics
- Dave Burba, pitcher for late 1990s Cleveland Indians; lives in Gilbert
- Tony Cascio, soccer player
- Haley Cavinder, college basketball player at Fresno State and Miami, grew up in Gilbert and graduated from Gilbert High School
- Marquis Cooper, professional linebacker; played for Highland High School
- Roy Wayne Farris, "The Honky Tonk Man", retired professional wrestler, WWE Hall of Fame inductee
- Ryan Fitzpatrick, former NFL quarterback; played for Highland High School
- Jineane Ford, Miss Arizona USA 1980, Miss USA 1980
- Alan Gordon, professional soccer player; raised in Gilbert
- Dan Hausel, Hall of Fame martial artist; resident of Gilbert since 2006
- Shea Hillenbrand, All-Star professional baseball player and rescue farm owner
- Darrin Jackson, professional baseball player, 1985–1999; TV broadcaster; lives in Gilbert
- Nick Johnson (born 1992), basketball player in the Israeli Basketball Premier League
- Kimberly Joiner, Miss Arizona USA 2008; raised in and still lives in Gilbert
- Keaton Jones, Olympic swimmer, attended Higley High School in Gilbert
- Mina Kimes, ESPN TV personality and journalist; lived in Gilbert during teenage years; attended Mesquite High School
- Naomi Lang, five-time U.S. ice dance champion, 2002 Olympian
- Spencer Larsen, former professional football player; raised in Gilbert; played for Highland High School
- Justin Lassen, artist; lives in Gilbert; graduated from Gilbert High School in 2000
- Lydia, band
- Bengie Molina, former Major League Baseball catcher; has lived in Gilbert since 2011
- Alex Naddour, bronze medalist at 2011 World Artistic Gymnastics Championships and in pommel horse at 2016 Summer Olympics; graduated from Highland High School
- Carlos I. Noriega, NASA astronaut; retired United States Marine Corps lieutenant colonel; lives in Gilbert
- Phil Ortega, MLB pitcher, 1960–1969; born in Gilbert in 1939
- Brock Purdy, NFL quarterback for the San Francisco 49ers
- MyKayla Skinner, gold medalist at 2014 World Artistic Gymnastics Championships; silver medalist on vault at the 2020 Summer Olympics
- Lindsey Stirling, violinist, dancer, and performer; Mesquite High School graduate
- Jalen Williams, NBA player for the Oklahoma City Thunder
- Rick Woolstenhulme, drummer for band Lifehouse

== Sister cities ==
Gilbert has two sister cities:

- Leshan, China
- Antrim and Newtownabbey, Northern Ireland
