= Sixth Avenue (disambiguation) =

Sixth Avenue is a major street in New York City.

Sixth Avenue or 6 Av may also refer to:

- Sixth Avenue (Tacoma), Washington
- 6 Av, the sixth day of Av, the fifth month of the Hebrew calendar

== See also ==
- Sixth Avenue Line (Manhattan surface), a former public transit line in New York
- Sixth Avenue Bridge, also known as North Sixth Street Bridge, in northeastern New Jersey
- U.S. Route 6 in Colorado, part of which is known as the 6th Avenue freeway
- Sixth Avenue MRT station, an MRT station in Singapore
- Sixth Avenue Electronics, a Springfield, New Jersey-based retail chain
- Sixth Avenue, Auckley, Doncaster in England is a street name where the private school Hill House School is
- 6th Avenue Hotel-Windsor Hotel, a historic building in Phoenix, Arizona, US
- "6th Avenue Heartache", a 1996 song by The Wallflowers
- Sixth Avenue Line (disambiguation)
- 6th Street (disambiguation)
