= The Sixth =

The Sixth may refer to:

- The Sixth (1981 film), a Soviet action film
- The Sixth (2024 film), an American documentary
- the sixth of the month, the sixth day of a month

== See also ==
- Sixth (disambiguation)
- The Sixth Amendment to the United States Constitution
