= 6/1 =

6/1 may refer to:

- June 1 (month-day date notation)
- January 6 (day-month date notation)
  - The United States Capitol attack, which occurred on January 6, 2021

== See also ==
- Sixth (disambiguation)
- 1/6 (disambiguation)
- Six One, Irish news show
- Six of One (disambiguation)
