= 1/6 =

1/6 or 1/6 may refer to:

- 1/6 (number), a fraction (one sixth, 1/6)
- 1/6 (EP), 2021, by Sunmi
- 1st Battalion, 6th Marines
- January 6 (month-day date notation)
  - The United States Capitol attack, which occurred on January 6, 2021
- 1 June (day-month date notation)

== See also ==
- 6/1 (disambiguation)
- One & Six, album by Apink
- One Six Right, documentary film
- Ones and Sixes, album by Low
- Schweizer SGU 1-6
- Six of One (disambiguation)
- Sixth (disambiguation)
