= Phoenix Historic Property Register =

Listing of historic properties of Phoenix, Arizona, US

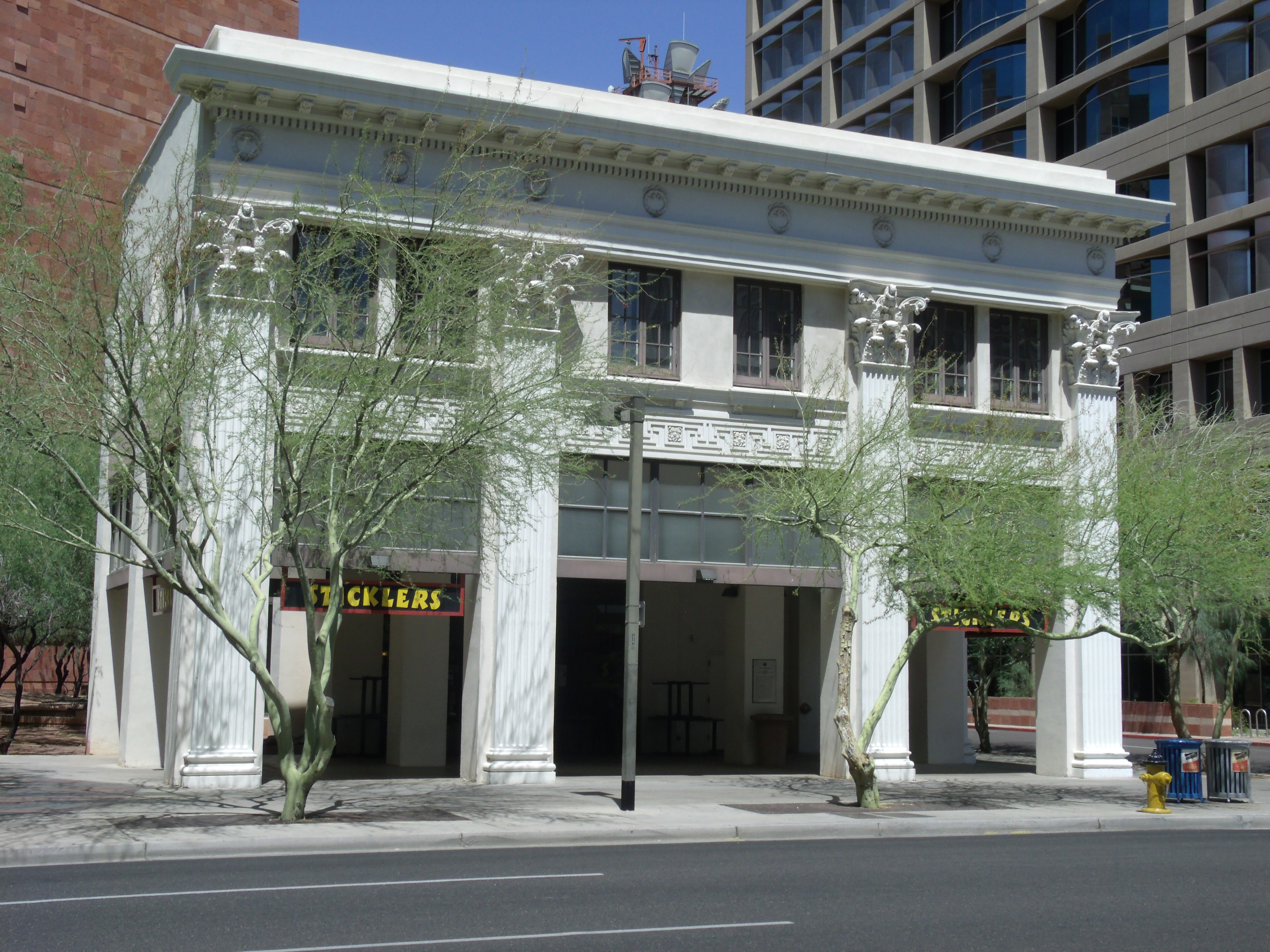
- Front view of the J.W. Walker Building (built 1920)

- Location in Maricopa County and the state of Arizona

The Phoenix Historic Property Register is the official listing of the historic and prehistoric properties in the city of Phoenix, the capital and largest city, of the U.S. state of Arizona. The city's register includes most or all places in Phoenix listed on the National Register of Historic Places and many more of local significance.

== History ==
The register was established on 1986 with the aim of recognizing buildings, structures, sites, objects and districts significant in local, regional, state or national history, architecture, archaeology, engineering and culture which have been deemed worthy of preservation.

The historic properties are divided into three categories and listed with a Historic Preservation zoning overlay. The categories are: Historic Residential Districts, Historic Non-Residential Districts and Individual Properties. The factors which are taken into consideration and which are included in the eligibility criteria for inclusion are:1.The historical significance of the property, 2. the age of the property (at least 50 years old) and 3. the integrity of the property (condition).

According to the Phoenix Historic Property Register, once listed, the properties are protected from demolition. However, according to Robert A. Melikian, author of the book "Vanishing Phoenix", Phoenix's preservation office does not have the ability to deny a demolition permit. Therefore, the owner of a property, listed either in the National Register of Historic Places or the Phoenix Historic Property Register, may demolish the historical property if he or she so wishes. Among the properties that have been demolished are the following:

- Arizona Citrus Growers Association Warehouse – 601 E. Jackson St.
- Craftsman Bungalow – 1241 E. Roosevelt St.

Some of the historic houses and buildings which are listed in the Phoenix Historic Property Register are also listed in the "enDangered Dozen Historic Places List," released by the Phoenix Historic Neighborhoods Coalition. These structures are prone to vandalism and the elements. Among the structures which are neglected and are at the highest risk of disappearing in the near future are the following:

- The William R. Norton House, built in 1895 and located at 2222 W. Washington St.

Norton founded the Sunnyslope subdivision of Phoenix and designed the Carnegie Library, the city’s first library, and the Gila County Courthouse in Globe, Arizona.

- The Charles Pugh House, built in 1897 and located at 356 N. Second Ave./ 362 N. Second Ave. (The 356 address is how the records show the house today. It was listed as 362 in older records.)
- The Louis Emerson House, built in 1902 and located at 623 N. Fourth St.
- The Concrete Block Bungalow, built in 1908 and located at 606 N. 9th St.
- The Leighton G. Knipe House, built in 1909 and located at 1025 N. 2nd Ave.
- The Sach's–Webster Farmstead House, built in 1909 and located in the Northwest corner of 75th Ave. and Baseline.
- The Sarah Pemberton House, built in 1920 and located at 1121 N. 2nd St.

Some of the properties listed in the Phoenix Historic Property Register are also listed in the National Register of Historic Places which is the United States federal government's official list of districts, sites, buildings, structures, and objects deemed worthy of preservation.

== Historic Residential Districts ==
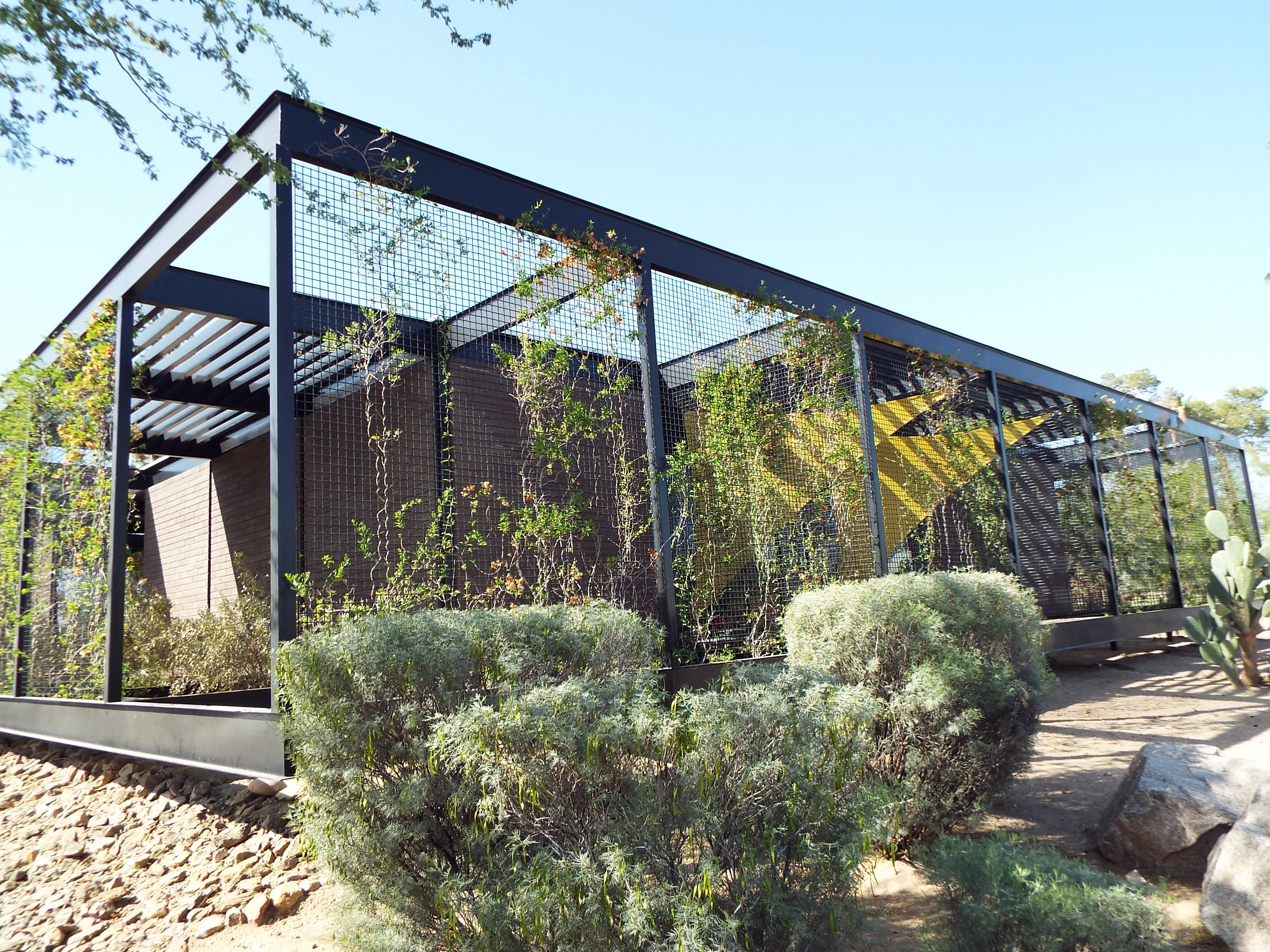
The Vlassis Ruzow and Associates Building, built in 1974, is located in the Margarita Historic District.

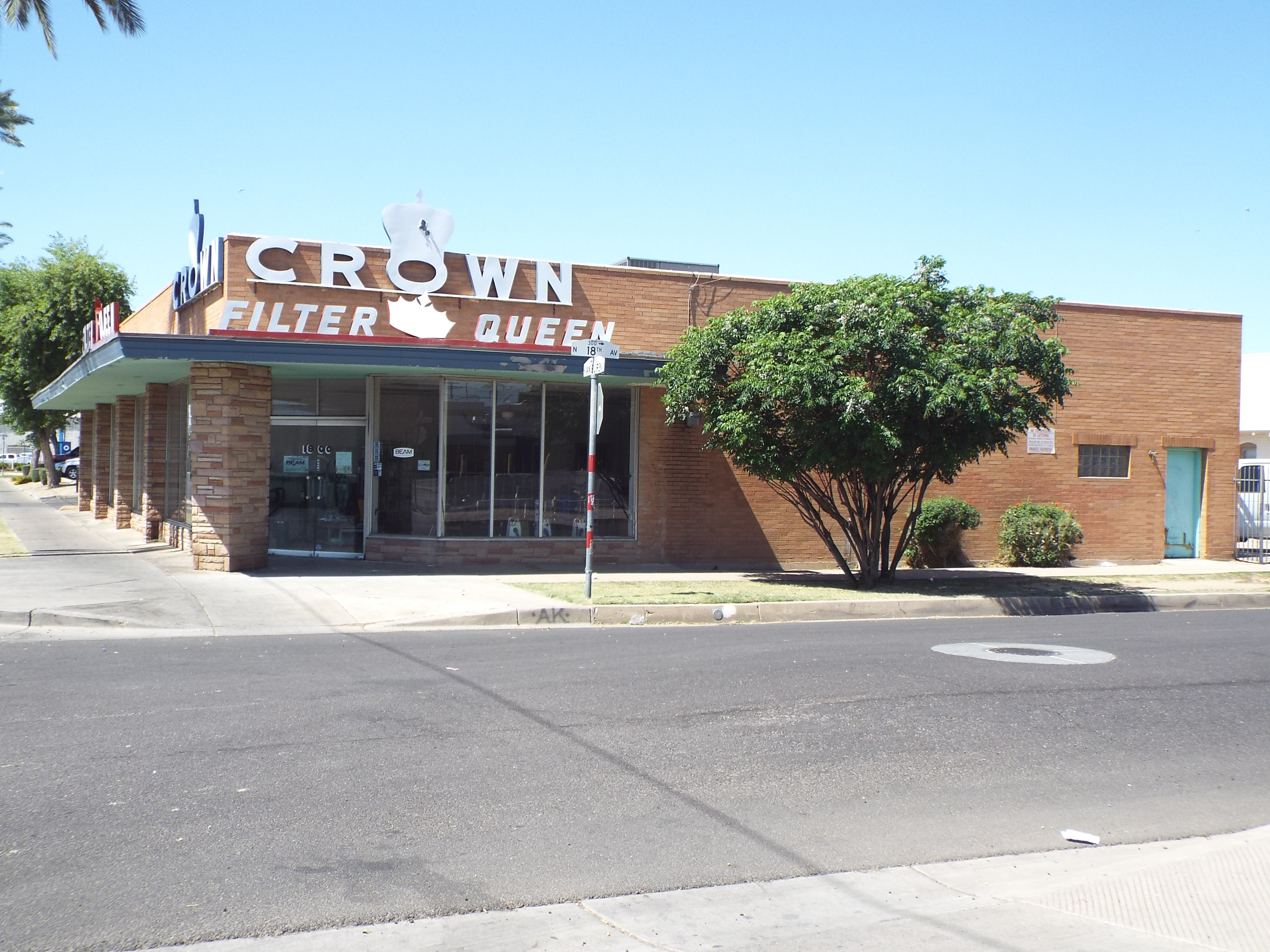
The Crown Filter Queen Building, built in 1955, is located in the Oakland Historic District.

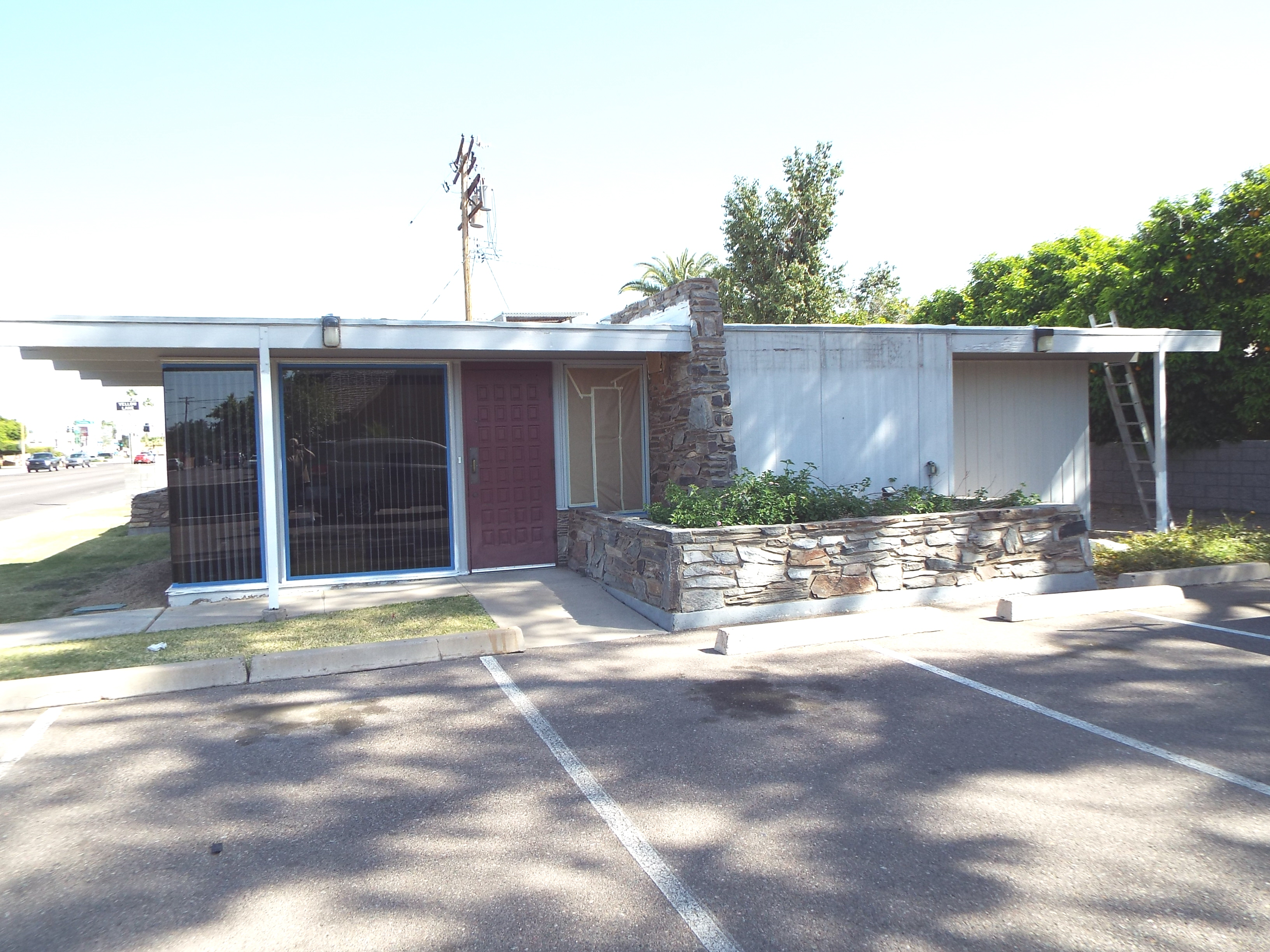
The Conn and Candlin CPA Office, built in 1962, is located in the Willo Historic District.

Historic Residential Districts in the Phoenix Historic Property Register
- Alvarado – Listed September 1992 (Period of Significance: 1907–1933)
- Ashland Place – Listed January 2003 (Period of Significance: 1920–1940)
- Brentwood – Listed April 2003 (Period of Significance: 1926–1956)
- Campus Vista – Listed April 2003 (Period of Significance: 1939–1956)
- Cheery Lynn – Listed February 1994 (Period of Significance: 1928–1945)
- Coronado – Listed January 2000 (Period of Significance: 1907–1942)
- Country Club Park – Listed January 1993 (Period of Significance: 1939–1946)
- Del Norte Place – Listed July 1993 (Period of Significance: 1927–1945)
- Earll Place – Listed April 2003 (Period of Significance: 1927–1942)
- East Alvarado – Listed May 1992 (Period of Significance: 1929–1942)
- East Evergreen – Listed November 1999 (Period of Significance: 1909–1929)
- Encanto-Palmcroft – Listed September 2005 (Period of Significance: 1920–1952)May 1992; boundary expansion January 2003 (Period of Significance: 1920–1940)
- Encanto Manor – Listed February 2006 (Period of Significance: 1945–1959)
- Encanto Vista – Listed April 2003 (Period of Significance: 1943–1953)
- Fairview Place – Listed February 1994 (Period of Significance: 1928–1948)
- F.Q. Story – Listed March 1988; boundary adjustments March 2000, January 2004 (Period of Significance: 1921–1942)
- Garfield – Listed December 2001 (as Dennis Addition Historic District); December 2002 (as Garfield Place Historic District); district consolidation, expansion and name change February 2005; boundary adjustment November 2005 (Period of Significance: 1883–1942)
- Idylwilde Park – Listed June 1991 (Period of Significance: 1928–1941)
- La Hacienda – Listed April 2003 (Period of Significance: 1926–1954)
- Los Olivos – Listed December 2003 (Period of Significance: 1906–1935)
- Margarita Place – Listed October 1999 (Period of Significance: 1927–1949)
- Medlock Place – Listed April 2003 (Period of Significance: 1926–1956)
- North Encanto – Listed December 2002 (Period of Significance: 1939–1950)
- North Garfield – Listed December 2002 (as Moreland Street Historic District); district consolidation, expansion and name change February 2005 (Period of Significance: 1887–1942)
- Oakland – Listed September 1988; boundary expansion June 2006 (Period of Significance: 1887–1951)
- Phoenix Homesteads – Listed January 1990 (Period of Significance: 1935–1937)
- Pierson Place – Listed November 2005 (Period of Significance: 1924–1956)
- Roosevelt – Listed September 1986; boundary adjustments October 1991, December 1997, November 2004 (Period of Significance: 1895–1930)
- Roosevelt Park – Listed March 2003 (Period of Significance 1924–1942)
- Villa Verde – Listed January 1999 (Period of Significance: 1928–1940)
- Willo – Listed June 2006 (Period of Significance: 1910–1956)
- Windsor Square – Listed July 1996 (Period of Significance: 1912–1945)
- Woodland – Listed February 1989; boundary expansion December 2002 (Period of Significance: 1880–1935)
- Woodlea – Listed January 1999 (Period of Significance: 1928–1949)
- Yaple Park – Listed June 1997 (Period of Significance: 1928–1940)

== Historic Non-Residential Districts ==
Historic Non-Residential Districts in the Phoenix Historic Property Register

	Name on the Register	Image	Location	Date listed	Period of significance
1	Heritage Square		Block 14 – located north of Washington Street extending to Monroe Street between 6th and 7th Streets. (Pictured is the 1901 Stevens-Haugsten House)	April 1989	1895–1920
2	Matthew Henson Public Housing Project		Located on the west side of Seventh Avenue just south of the Sherman Street alignment.	June 2005	1940–1941
3	Central Avenue Streetscape		Located within North the Central Avenue right-of-way between Bethany Home Road and the Arizona Canal.	July 2004	1895–1951
4	Papago Park		Bounded by Van Buren Street and McDowell Road between 52nd Street and the Arizona Crosscut Canal. (Pictured is the "Hole-in-the-Rock" landmark)	October 1989	1932–1946
5	Phoenix Indian School		Located west of Third Street and north of Indian School Road.	October 1992; landmark designation March 2004	1891–1931
6	Phoenix Union High School Campus		Located along the north side of Van Buren Street between Fifth and Seventh streets.	December 1986; landmark designation and boundary adjustment January 2003	1911–1929
7	Pioneer Cemetery & Memorial Park		Bounded by 13th and 15th avenues, Jefferson and Harrison streets.	June 1991; landmark designation March 2004	1880–1914)
8	Pueblo Grande Museum & Archaeological Park		4619 E. Washington St.	September 1991; landmark designation June 2005	500–1941
9	South Mountain Park & Preserves		Located south of Baseline Road extending as far as the alignment of Chandler Boulevard, between 48th Street on the east and 47th Avenue on the west.	October 1989	1933–1942

== Individual properties ==
Individual properties in the Phoenix Historic Property Register

	Name on the Register	Image	Location	Date listed	Year built
1	Adams School / Grace Court School		800 W. Adams St..	April 1987	1911
2	Agren-Taylor House		521 E. Willetta St.	June 2009	1921
3	Aldridge (Aubrey & Winstona) House		1326 E. Jefferson St.	June 2005	1950
4	American Legion Post 41		715 S. Second Ave.	November 2007	1948
5	Anchor Manufacturing Company		525 S. Central Ave.	November 2007	1928
6	Anderson (Helen) House		149 W. McDowell Road	September 1986	1900
7	Arizona Biltmore Resort		2400 E. Missouri Ave.	July 2009	1929
8	Arizona Hardware Supply Company Warehouse		22 E. Jackson St.	June 2009	1930
9	Arizona Museum		Located within University Park between 10th and 12th avenues, Van Buren and Polk streets.	April 1989	1927
10	Arizona Sash, Door & Glass Company Warehouse		850 W. Lincoln St.	February 2020	1926
11	Arrow Motel/Rainbow Motel		2262 Grand Ave	October 2020	1937
12	Arvizu's El Fresnal Grocery Store		310 E. Buchanan St.	July 2000; landmark designation July 2009	1900
13	Asbury-Salmon House		7801 N. Central Ave.	March 2003	1920
14	Barbara Jean Apartments		212–214 E. Portland St.	September 2004	1927
15	Bayless (J.B.) Store #7		825 N. Seventh St.	November 1998	1928
16	Betania Presbyterian Church		301 W. Pima St.	October 2007	1951
17	Blake, Moffitt & Towne Janitorial & Paper Supply Company Warehouse		101 E. Buchanan St.	July 2000	1927
18	Bobby Brown Café		1714–1718 W. Van Buren St.	March 2005	1930
19	Bohn (Louis) House		8001 N. Seventh St.	March 2003	1928
20	Boone (Daniel Boone & Clara) House		1720 W. Elm St.	November 2005	1940
21	Bragg's Pies, Inc.		1301 Grand Ave.	November 2005	1925
22	Brockway (Dr. George M.) House		506 E. Portland St.	February 2005	1909
23	Bungalow Farm Residence		6413 S. 26th St.	January 1993	1935
24	Campbell (Rev. Henry M.) House		826 N. Third Ave.	September 1986	1910
25	Carnegie Public Library & Park		1101 W. Washington St.	April 1989; landmark designation. March 2004	1907
26	Cartwright School		5833 W. Thomas Road	June 2007	1924
27	Carver (George Washington) High School		415 E. Grant St.	May 1992	1926
28	Cavness (William E.) House		606 N. Fourth Ave.	November 2004	1914
29	Central Arizona Light & Power Company Warehouse		501 S. Third Ave.	July 2000	1928–1929
30	Chambers Transfer & Storage Company Central Warehouse		15–39 E. Jackson St.	May 1990	1925
31	Chambers Transfer & Storage Company Warehouse		309 S. Fourth Ave.	April 1987	1923
32	Cisney (George) House		916 E. McKinley St.	March 1994	1897
33	Cobb Bros. Market Warehouse		430 S. Second Ave.	July 2000	1932
34	Coe (H.M.) House		365 N. Fourth Ave.	October 2002	1895
35	Concrete Block Bungalow		606 N. Ninth St.	February 2005	1908
36	Concrete Block Neoclassical House		614 N. Fourth Ave.	September 1986	1906
37	Concrete Block Neoclassical House		640 N. Sixth Ave.	September 1986	1911
38	Converse (Ralph) House		6617 N. Central Ave.	March 2003	1935
39	Conway (Col. Edward Power) House		7625 N. 10th St.	May 2003	1928–1929
40	Corpstein Duplex		417 W. Roosevelt St.	April 1986	1920
41	Crippled Children's Hospital		1825 E. Garfield St.	September 2020	1941
42	Cronin (C.P.) House		2029 W. Jefferson St.	October 2002	1893
43	Day (Dud R.) Motor Company / Phoenix Motor Company building		401 W. Van Buren St.	May 2017	1930
44	Del Monte Market		2659 W. Dobbins Road	September 1992; boundary expansion April 2004	1908
45	DeMund (Herman P.) House		649 N. Second Ave.	September 1986	1910
46	DeMund (Lester) House		363 E. Monte Vista Road	September 1992	1930
47	Diller (Adam) House / Lightning Z Ranch House		8702 N. Seventh Ave.	March 1994	1909
48	Dougherty-Peterson House		2141 W. Washington St.	March 1994	1899
49	Douglas (Lewis) House		815 E. Orangewood Ave.	May 1990	1923
50	Dunbar (Paul Laurence) School		701 S. Ninth Ave. / 707 W. Grant St.	March 2005	1925
51	Dunlap (Charles H.) House		650 N. First Ave.	September 1986	1914
52	Duppa-Montgomery Adobe		715 S. Second Ave. / 116 W. Sherman St.	November 2005	1870
53	Eastlake Park		Bounded by 15th, 16th, Jefferson and Jackson streets.	June 2005	1889–1950
54	El Encanto Apartment Building		2214 N. Central Ave.	December 1990	1939
55	El Portal Restaurant		701 S. Second Ave. / 117 W. Grant St.	November 2007	1947
56	El Zaribah Shrine Auditorium		1502 W. Washington St.	June 1989	1921
57	Ellis-Shackelford House		1242 N. Central Ave.	September 1986	1917
58	Emerson (Louis) House		623 N. Fourth St.	May 1990	1902
59	England (A.E.) Motors, Inc.		424 N. Central Ave.	May 2006	1926
60	England–Lawrence House		6234 N. Central Ave.	March 2003	1929
61	Evans (Dr. John M.) House		1100 W. Washington St.	December 1986	1893
62	Executive Towers		207 West Clarendon Street	October 2018	1962
63	Faith Lutheran Church		801 E. Camelback Road	December 1997	1946–1955
64	Farish (William A.) House		816 N. Third St.	October 2002	1900
65	Farmers & Stockmens Bank		5001 E. Washington St.	October 2014	1950–1951
66	Fennemore (Harry M.) House		501 E. Moreland St.	September 2004	1912
67	First Baptist Church		302 W. Monroe St.	April 1995	1929
68	First Presbyterian Church		402 W. Monroe St.	November 1997	1892
69	Franklin School		1645 (1625) W. McDowell Road / 1414 N. 16th Dr.	November 1997	1927
70	Fry Building		146 E. Washington St.	April 1987	1885
71	Fuller (W.P.) Paint Company Warehouse		117 E. Jackson St.	July 2009	1929
72	Gas Works		401 S. Second Ave.	July 2000	1910
73	Gates (Neil H.) House'		4602 N. Elsie Ave.	October 1990	1929
74	General Electric Supply Warehouse		435–441 W. Madison St.	July 2000	1930
75	General Sales Company Warehouse		435–441 W. Madison St.	October 2016	1946
76	George (Mrs. Leonard) House		6611 N. Central Ave.	March 2003	1929
77	Gerardo's Building		421 S. Third St.	July 2000; landmark designation: July 2009	1928
78	Gibbes (Carter W.) House		2233 N. Alvarado Road	April 1987	1930
79	Good Shepherd Home for Girls		Near the northeast corner of Northern and 19th avenues	November 1988	1942
80	Grace Lutheran Church		1124 N. Third St.	November 1997	1928
81	Graham Paper Company Warehouse		521 S. Third St. / 310 E. Lincoln St.	July 2009	1949
82	Grant Park		714 S. Second Ave. / 701 S. Third Ave.	November 2007	1934
83	Greystone Apartments		645–649 N. Fourth Ave.	September 1986	1930
84	Grier (William & Mary) House		1942 W. Adams St.	November 2007	1901
85	Grunow (Lois) Memorial Clinic		926 E. McDowell Road	April 1987	1931
86	Halm-Howard House		6850 N. Central Ave.	November 2005	1906–1907
87	Hanny's		40 (44) N. First St.	June 2005	1947
88	Harmon Park		1425 S. Fifth Ave.	October 2007	1927
89	Heard Museum		2301 N. Central Ave. / 22 E. Monte Vista Road	August 1992	1929
90	Heard Ranch Grain Silos		In the vicinity of 30th Street and Vineyard Road	March 1993	1930
91	Hedgpeth Hills Petroglyph Site		Approximately 1/4 mile north of the intersection of 43rd Avenue and Beardsley Road.	May 1990	Period of Significance: 700–1050
92	Hidden (George) House		763 E. Moreland St.	March 1994	1896
93	Hilgeman (Frank & Sarah) House		333 W. Loma Lane	December 2015	1933
94	Holloway (Dr. Jean S.) House		7215 N. Central Ave.	November 2005	1928
95	Hotel San Carlos		202 N. Central Ave.	June 1987	1928
96	Hotel Westward Ho		618 N. Central Ave.	September 1986	1928
97	Humbert (William K.) House		2238 N. Alvarado Road	April 1987	1932
98	Immaculate Heart of Mary Church		909 E. Washington St.	November 1997	1928
99	Jacobs (Judge Fred C.) House		6224 N. Central Ave.	March 2003	1928
100	Jefferson Hotel		101 S. Central Ave.	June 2005	1915
101	Jones-Montoya House		1008 E. Buckeye Road	March 1994	1879
102	Kelly (J.F.) House		44 E. Palm Lane	September 1992	1922
103	Kenilworth School		1210 N. Fifth Ave.	September 1986	1918–1920
104	King's Rest Hotel Motor Court		801 S. 17th Ave.	October 1990	1937
105	Knights of Pythias Building		829 N. First Ave.	September 1986	1928
106	Knipe (Leighton G.) House		1025 N. Second St.	September 2004	1909
107	Koontz (Kinter K.) House		7620 N. Seventh St.	March 2003	1929
108	Kunz-Carbajal House		1721 S. Seventh Ave.	March 1994	1904
109	Lugo (Luis) Bakery		415 (417) W. Sherman St. / 801 S. Fifth Ave.	November 2007	1917
110	Luhrs Building		11 W. Jefferson St.	January 1990	1924
111	Luhrs Tower		45 W. Jefferson St.	January 1990	1929
112	Maricopa County Courthouse		125 W. Washington St.	April 1989; landmark designation March 2004	1928–1929
113	Masonic Temple		345 W. Monroe St.	October 1996	1926
114	McClintock (Col. James H.) House		323 E. Willetta St.	October 1990	1911
115	McKinley School		512 E. Pierce St.	September 2004	1919
116	Merryman Funeral Home		817 N. First St.	November 2005	1937
117	Monroe School		215 N. Seventh St.	May 1987; landmark designation and boundary expansion March 2004	1914
118	Monterey Ranch Residence		40 E. Carter Road	July 1993	1927
119	Morgan (D.B.) House		8030 N. Central Ave.	November 2005	1927
120	Morse-Kelley House		2141 W. Madison St.	October 2002	1900
121	Murphy (William J.) House		7514 N. Central Ave. / 10 W. Orangewood Ave.	March 1994	1895
122	Mystery Castle		800 E. Mineral Road	May 1990	1930–1945
123	Neighborhood House		6029 S. Seventh St.	May 1990	1937
124	Nevitt (Guy P.) House		507 E. Moreland St.	September 2004	1919
125	Norton (Dr. James C.) House		2700 N. 15th Ave.	April 1989	1912–1913
126	Norton (William R.) House		2222 W. Washington St.	November 2002	1895
127	Olney-Ellinwood House		6810 N. Central Ave.	March 2003	1912
128	Ong Yut Geong Wholesale Market Warehouse		502 S. Second St.	July 2000	1930
129	Jim Ong's Market		1110 E. Washington St.	May 1990	1928
130	Orpheum Theatre		203 (209) W. Adams St.	April 1987; landmark designation March 2004	1929
131	Osborn (William) House		1266 W. Pierce St.	January 1989	1890
132	Ozell M. Trask House		333 W. Gardenia Dr.	October 2020	1956
133	Palmer (E. Payne) House		6012 N. Central Ave.	June 1999	1929
134	Patterson (William H.) Elks Lodge #477		1007 S. Seventh Ave.	June 2005	1946
135	Peirce (Harry E.) House		632 N. Third Ave.	September 1986	1910
136	Pemberton (Sarah H.) House		1121 N. Second St.	September 2004	1920
137	Phillips (Lucy) Memorial C.M.E. Church		1415 (1401) E. Adams St.	June 2005	1947
138	Phoenix City Hall (Old City Hall)		17 S. Second Ave.	April 1989; landmark designation March 2004	1928–1929
139	Phoenix Elementary School District No. 1 Administration Building		331 N. First Ave.	October 1996	1917
140	Phoenix Housing Authority		1301 S. Third Ave.	October 2007	1941
141	Phoenix Linen & Towel Supply Company Warehouse		702–706 S. Third St. / 215 E. Grant St.	February 2010	1929
142	Phoenix Second Ward L.D.S. Church		1120 N. Third Ave. / 302 W. Latham St.	September 1986	1929–1932
143	Phoenix Seed & Feed Company Warehouse		411 S. Second St.	March 2004	1905
144	Phoenix Star Theatre / Celebrity Theatre		440 N. 32nd St.	September 2013	1963
145	Phoenix Union Station		401 W. Harrison St.	December 1986	1923
146	Pierce (N. Clyde) House		4505 E. Osborn Road	May 1990	1927
147	Pieri-Elliot House		767 E. Moreland St.	June 1997	1920–1922
148	Pinney (William & Nathalie) House		1938 (1930) W. Adams St.	November 2007	1899
149	Pratt-Gilbert Building		200 S. Central Ave. / 1 W. Madison St.	October 2001	1913
150	Produce Center Building		2202 W. McDowell Road	October 2020	1953–1954
151	Professional Building		137 N. Central Ave. / 15 E. Monroe St.	January 1993	1931
152	Progressive Builders Association		2019 E. Broadway Road	June 2005	1953
153	Pueblo Revival Residence		46 E. Greenway Road	July 1993	1926
154	Pueblo Revival Residence		8048 (8050) S. 14th Street	March 2008	1930
155	Pugh (Charles) House		356 (362) N. Second Ave.	September 2003	1897
156	Rancho Joaquina House		4630 E. Cheery Lynn Road	April 1987	1924
157	Rancho Ko-Mat-Ke House		1346 E. South Mountain Ave.	April 1989	1925
158	Rehbein Grocery		1227–1231 Grand Ave.	November 2005	1920–1927
159	Roberts (Oscar) House		2004 W. Madison St.	October 2002	1893
160	Roosevelt Community Church		924 N. First St.	September 2004	1925
161	Rosson (Dr. Roland L.) House		115 N. Sixth St.	Landmark designation March 2004	1894–1895
162	"S" Mountain		Located west of Central Avenue and south of Mountain View Road.	2011	"S" painted in 1954
163	Sachs–Webster Farmstead		Located at the southwest corner of 75th Avenue and Baseline Road.	December 2003	1909
164	Sacred Heart Church		801 S. 16th St.	October 2007	1900
165	Sacred Heart House for the Aged		110 N. 16th St.	March 2019	1960
166	St. Mary's Basilica		231 N. Third St.	April 1987	1903–1913
167	Santa Fe Freight Depot		501 W. Jackson St.	July 2000	1929
168	Santa Rita Center		1017 E. Hadley St.	October 2007	1962
169	Scorpion Gulch		10225 S. Central Ave.	October 1990	1936
170	Seargeant–Oldaker House		649 N. Third Ave.	September 1986	1909
171	Security Building		234 N. Central Ave.	July 1987	1927–1928
172	Sedler (John) House		1204 E. Roosevelt St.	February 2005	1912
173	Shell Oil Company		425 S. 16th Ave.	April 1987	1925
174	Sierra Vista		6802 S. 28th St.	March 1993	1913
175	6th Avenue Hotel-Windsor Hotel		546 W. Adams St.	June 1987	1893
176	Skinner (E.W.) House		917 E. Roosevelt St.	October 2002	1899
177	Smith (Walter Lee) House		7202 N. Seventh Ave.	May 2003	1928
178	Smurthwaite House		1317 W. Jefferson St.	Landmark designation March 2004	1897
179	Sotelo-Heard Cemetery		Located southeast of the intersection of 12th Street and Broadway Road.	October 2007	Established in 1896 (Now in state of total abandonment)
180	Southwest Cotton Company / Karlson Machine Works		104 E. Grant St.	June 2005	1918
181	Spanish Colonial Revival Residence		47 E. Carter Road	March 2008	1927
182	Spanish Colonial Revival Residence		133 E. Carter Road	July 1993	1930
183	Spanish Colonial Revival Residence		333 E. Carter Road	July 1993	1916
184	Spanish Colonial Revival Residence		1200 W. South Mountain Ave.	March 2008	1926
185	Spanish Colonial Revival Residence		6451 S. 28th St.	March 2008	1930
186	Stag Hotel / Patio Hotel		27 W. Madison St.	October 2001	1931
187	Stapley (O.S.) Company Buildings		723–735 Grand Ave.	September 2012	1927
188	Stephens (C.P.) DeSoto Six Motor Cars		915 (913–917) N. Central Ave.	September 2012	1928
189	Stoddard-Harmon House		801 N. First Ave.	September 1986	1910
190	Storage Warehouse (Ice House)		429 W. Jackson St.	April 1987	1920–1922
191	Stoughton (Ralph H.) Estate		805 W. South Mountain Ave.	May 1990; boundary adjustments June 2006, October 2010	1930–1931
192	Strong (Walter) Residence		2501 E. Baseline Road	March 1993	1929
193	Stubbs (Courtney & Hilda) House		1245 E. Ocotillo Road	February 2006	1928
194	Sun Mercantile Building		232 S. Third St.	March 1987	1929
195	Swindall Tourist Inn		1021 E. Washington St.	October 1996	1913
196	Tanner Chapel A.M.E. Church		20 S. Eighth St.	December 2010	1929
197	Temple Beth Israel / First Chinese Baptist Church / Iglesia Bautista Central		122 E. Culver St.	June 2006	1921–1922
198	Title & Trust Building		112 N. First Ave. / 114 W. Adams St.	May 1987	1931
199	Tovrea Castle		5041 E. Van Buren St.	December 1990; landmark designation and boundary expansion March 2004	1928–1930
200	Tovrea Land & Cattle Co. Administration Building / Stockyards Restaurant		5009 E. Washington St.	March 2004	1919; 1947; rebuilt 1953–1954
201	Tudor Revival Residence		120 E. Carter Road	July 1993	1936
202	Tudor Revival Residence		106 E. Greenway Road	July 1993	1931
203	Tudor Revival Residence		1600 W. Colter St.	March 2003	1925
204	Tweed (Judge Charles A.) House		1611 W. Fillmore St.	September 1988	1881
205	U.S. Post Office / Federal Building		522 N. Central Ave.	October 1990	1932–1936
206	University Park Bath House		Located within University Park between 10th and 12th avenues, Van Buren and Polk streets	April 1989	1934
207	Vernacular Farm Residence		2956 E. Southern Ave.	September 1992	1915
208	Vernacular Residence		818 S. First Ave.	October 2002	1885
209	Wakelin (E.S.) Grocery Company Warehouse		219 S. Fifth Ave. / 440 W. Jackson St.	July 2000	1913
210	Walker (J.W.) Building / Central Arizona Light & Power Company		300 W. Washington St. / 30 N. Third Ave.	October 1996	1920
211	Washington (Booker T.) School		1201 (1209) E. Jefferson St.	June 2005	1928
212	Wastewater Treatment Plant Control Building		2301 W. Durango St. (The structure is now within the confines of the Arizona Department of Transportation District whose address is 2140 W. Hilton.)	October 1992	1931
213	Webster Auditorium		Located within Papago Park	October 1989	1939
214	Western Wholesale Drug Company Warehouse		101 E. Jackson St.	July 1987	1925
215	Whitney (J.T.) Funeral Chapel		330 N. Second Ave.	April 1987	1926
216	Whittier (John G.) School		2000 N. 16th St.	March 2005	1929
217	Wormley (Dr. Lowell) House		1910 E. Broadway Road	June 2005	1949
218	Wrigley (William Jr.) Mansion		2501 E. Telawa Trail	May 1990	1930

== See also ==
- Phoenix, Arizona
- List of historic properties in Phoenix
- National Register of Historic Places listings in Phoenix, Arizona
- History of Phoenix, Arizona

- Pioneer and Military Memorial Park
- Sunnyslope, Arizona
- Pioneer Living History Museum
- USS Arizona salvaged artifacts

Historic structures in Phoenix with articles

- Buildings and structures in Phoenix, Arizona

- Smurthwaite House
- El Cid Castle
- Windsor Hotel
- Squaw Peak Inn

- National Register of Historic Places listings in Maricopa County, Arizona
