= Sunnyslope Mountain =

Mountain in Phoenix, Arizona

- S Mountain
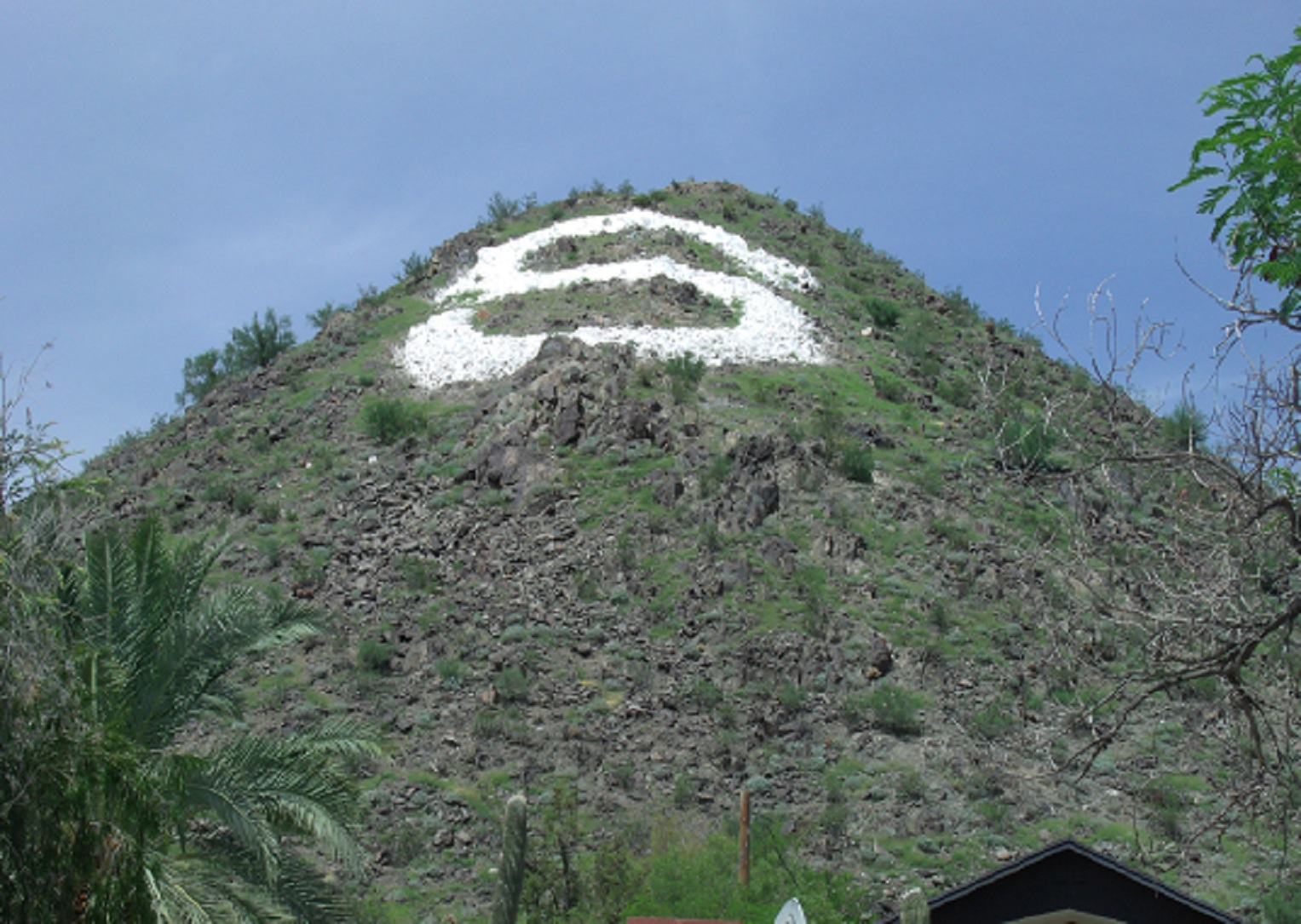

Highest point
- Elevation: c. 1,500 ft (460 m)
- Coordinates: 33°34′28″N 112°04′36″W

Geography
- Location within Arizona
- Location: City of Phoenix; Maricopa County, Arizona, U.S.
- Topo map: USGS Sunnyslope

Sunnyslope Mountain also known as "S" Mountain is a large, rocky, nearly symmetric hill in the Sunnyslope section of Phoenix, Arizona. It is located near Central Avenue and Hatcher Road. The southern slope of the mountain is adorned with a 150-foot white majuscule "S". The mountain, in particular the large "S", can be seen from thirty miles away on a clear day, and is distinctly visible to nearby airplane passengers. Although the mountain is part of the Phoenix Mountains, the mountain is most closely associated with Sunnyslope High School. Each year, the freshmen class is assigned the task of hiking up the mountain and giving the "S" a fresh coat of white paint. At the end of the Homecoming football game, the "S" is traditionally outlined with red flares which are ignited by members of the freshmen football team. Students came together in June 2004 to convert the "S" to a "J" in memory of Josh Conard, a basketball player for Sunnyslope who was killed by a drunk driver. When the school was remodeled in the mid-1990s, the view of Sunnyslope Mountain from the home football stands was partially obstructed. However, Sunnyslope Mountain remains one of the most visible, artificial features of the northern skyline of the Valley of the Sun.

The name of the mountain is derived from the bordering Sunnyslope district of Phoenix. Sunnyslope is generally defined as the area east and south of North Mountain and north of the Arizona Canal. It is listed on the Phoenix Historic Property Register.

Sunnyslope Mountain
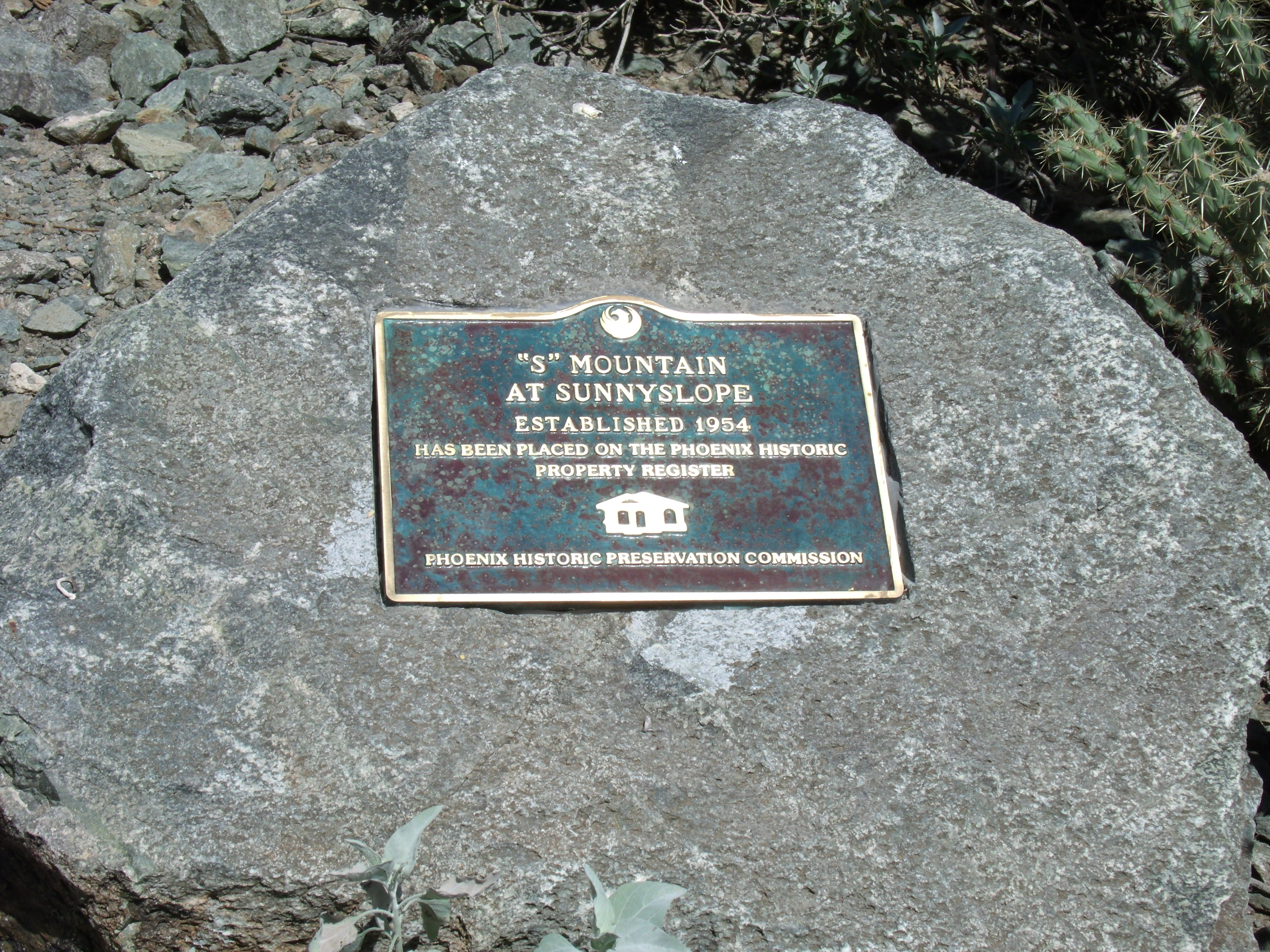
Phoenix Historic Property Register marker at the summit trailhead

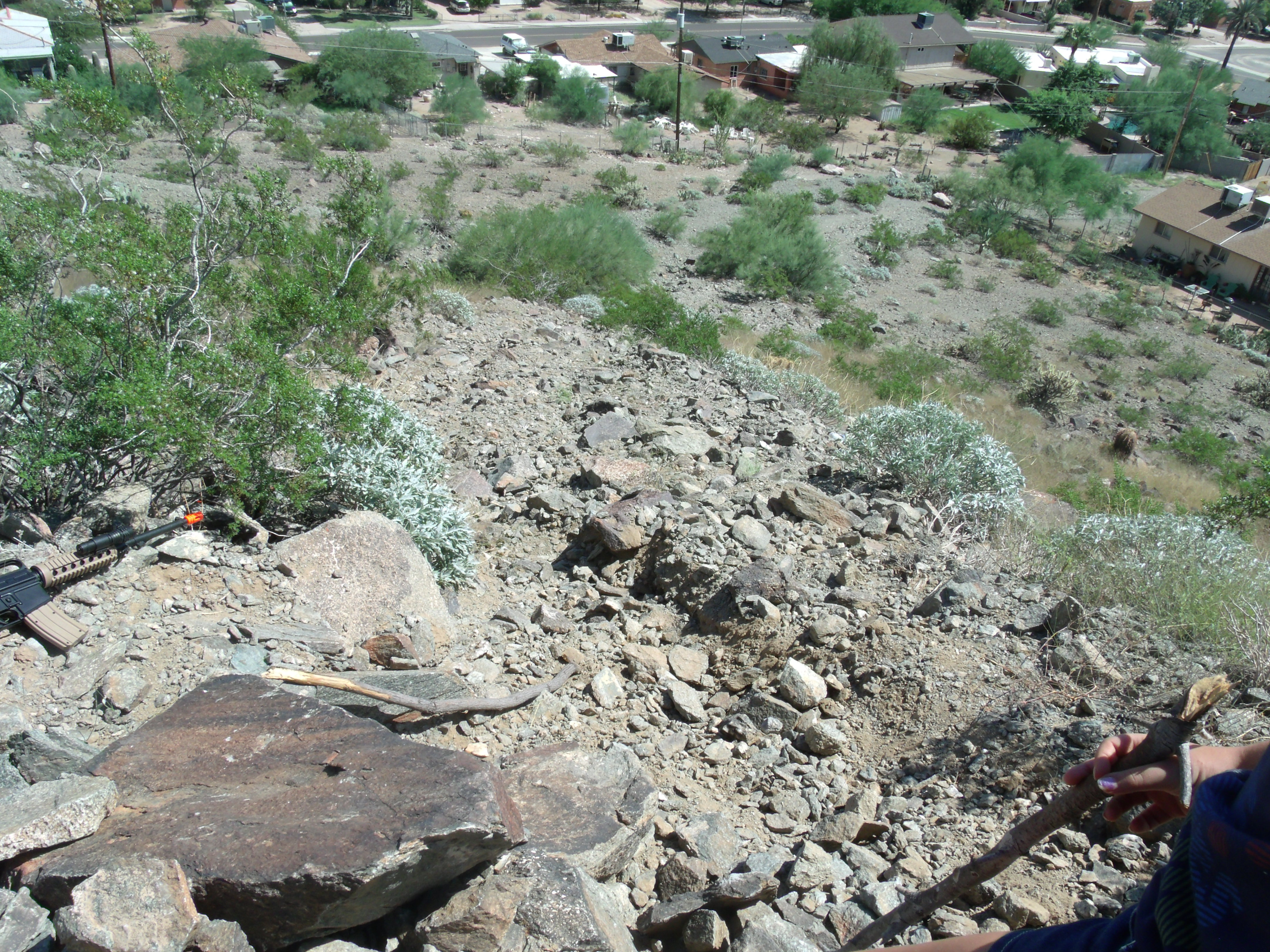
View from the trail

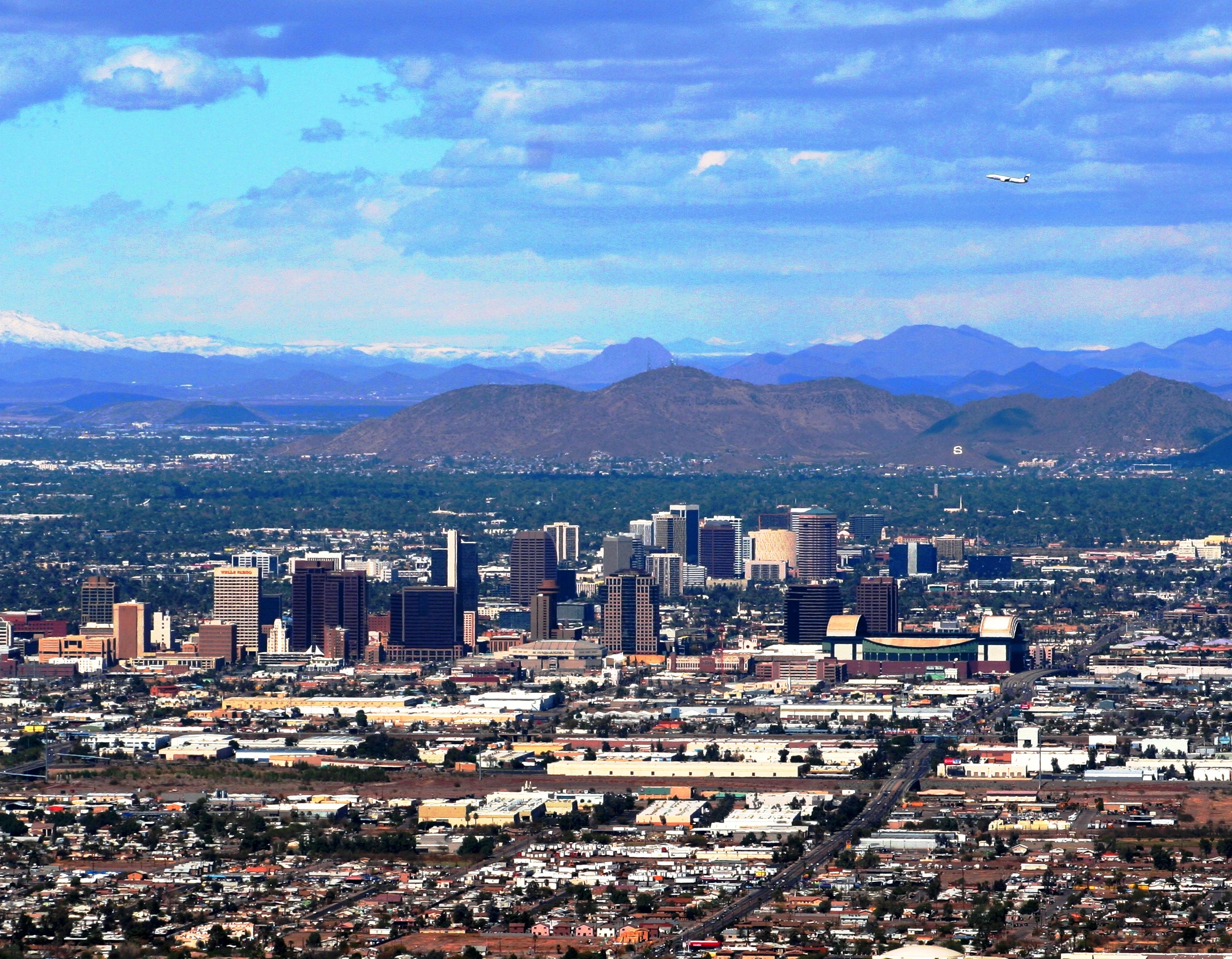
Northern skyline, downtown Phoenix in foreground, "S" mountain clearly visible on high resolution.
