= Scorpion Gulch =

Historic building in Phoenix, Arizona

Coordinates: 33.3536°N 112.0744°W

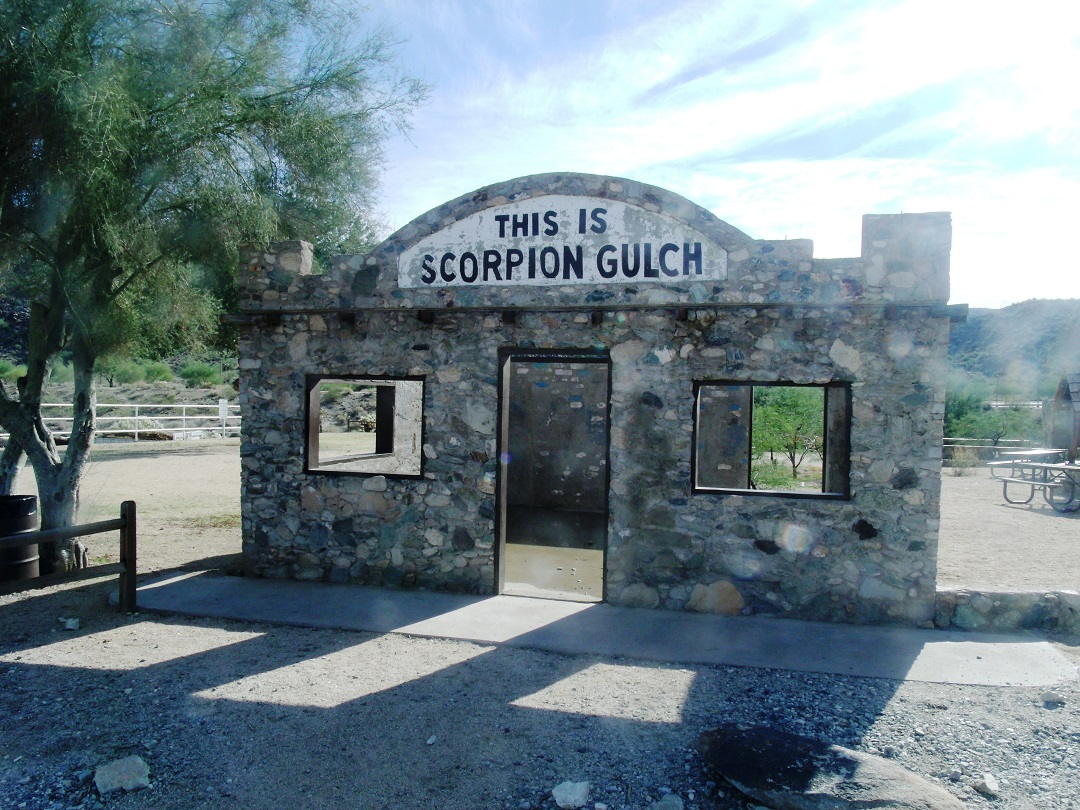
Scorpion Gulch store

Located in South Mountain Park in Phoenix, Arizona, Scorpion Gulch was built as a home and store by William Lunsford. Lunsford's store sold curios, Indigenous-made items, sodas, and candy. It was still in operation in 1966, when Lunsford was 75. In the 1970s, it became a bar. According to the Phoenix Historic Property Register, Scorpion Gulch was built in 1936, and was first listed on the historic preservation register in October 1990. Historical photographs show a sign on the original building entitled, "South Mountain Trading Post", under which jewelry, Indian curios, and leather goods are advertised.

== Scorpion Gulch today ==
Today, Scorpion Gulch, and its neighboring building are open to the public. Located at 10225 S. Central Ave, Scorpion Gulch is easily accessible and visible while driving South Central Avenue toward South Mountain. The roofs of both buildings are almost all but entirely gone, either for safety, or nature's toll. It is rumored that the building was burned at one point in its history; however, this is not evident by looking at either of the buildings themselves.

== Reconstruction ==
The City of Phoenix Parks and Recreation Department began stabilization work on Scorpion Gulch and the surrounding building in November 2012. The work was scheduled for completion in February 2013. The roof of the building labeled "Scorpion Gulch" has been removed, and the wood window frames of the various structures have been replaced.

== Gallery ==
Scorpion Gulch Gallery
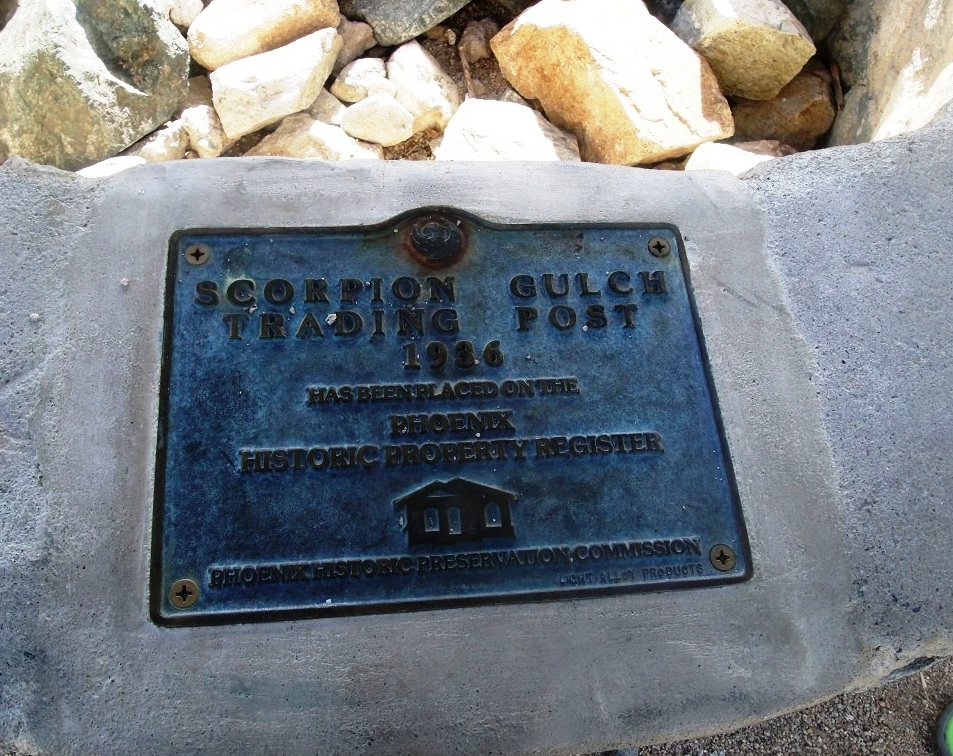
Scorpion Gulch historical marker which reads "Scorpion Gulch Trading Post 1936".

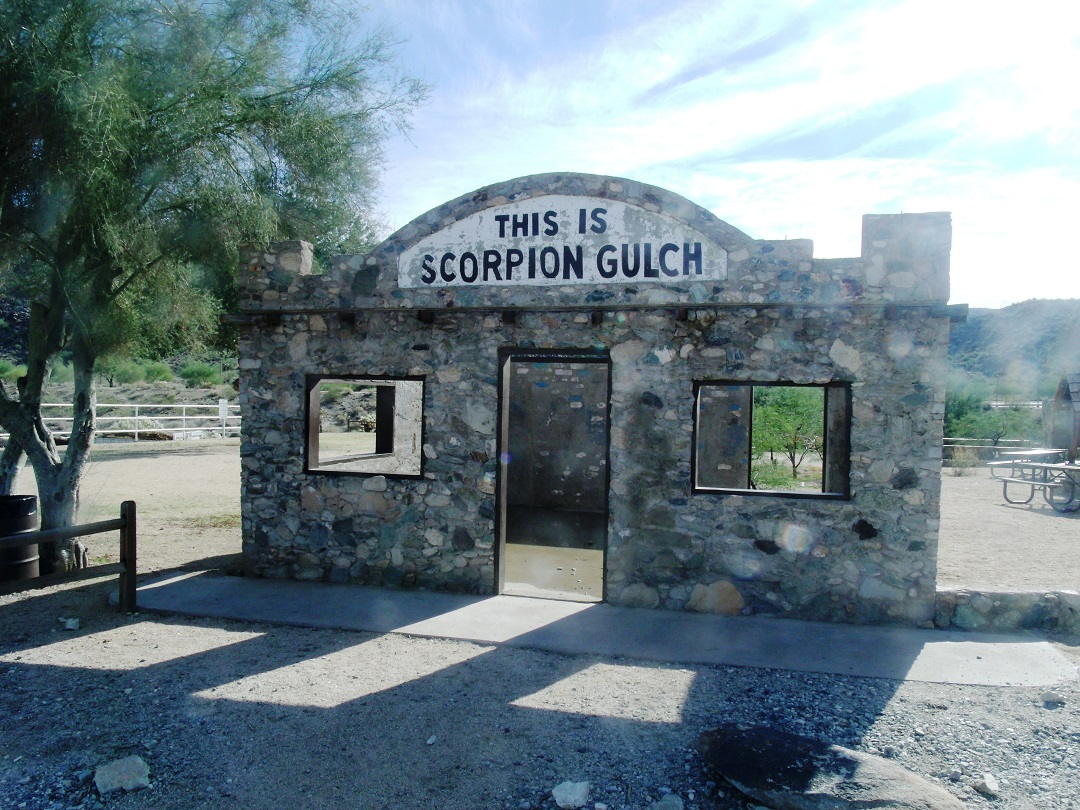
The Scorpion Gulch store was built in 1936 by William Lunsford. It is located at 10225 S. Central Ave, in South Mountain Park in Phoenix, Arizona. The property was listed in the Phoenix Historic Property and Preservation Register in October of 1990.

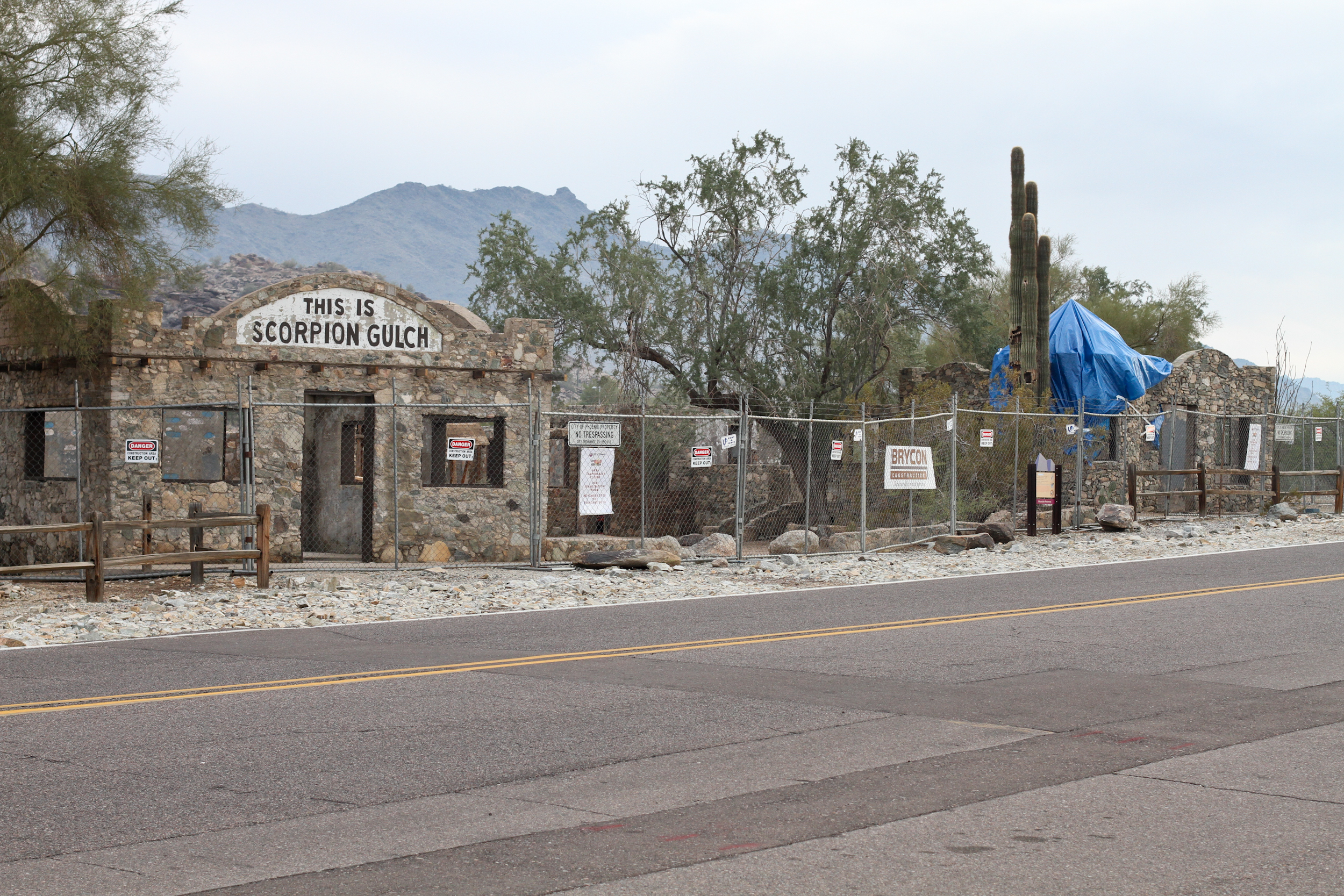
"Stabilization" work performed from November 2012 to February 2013.

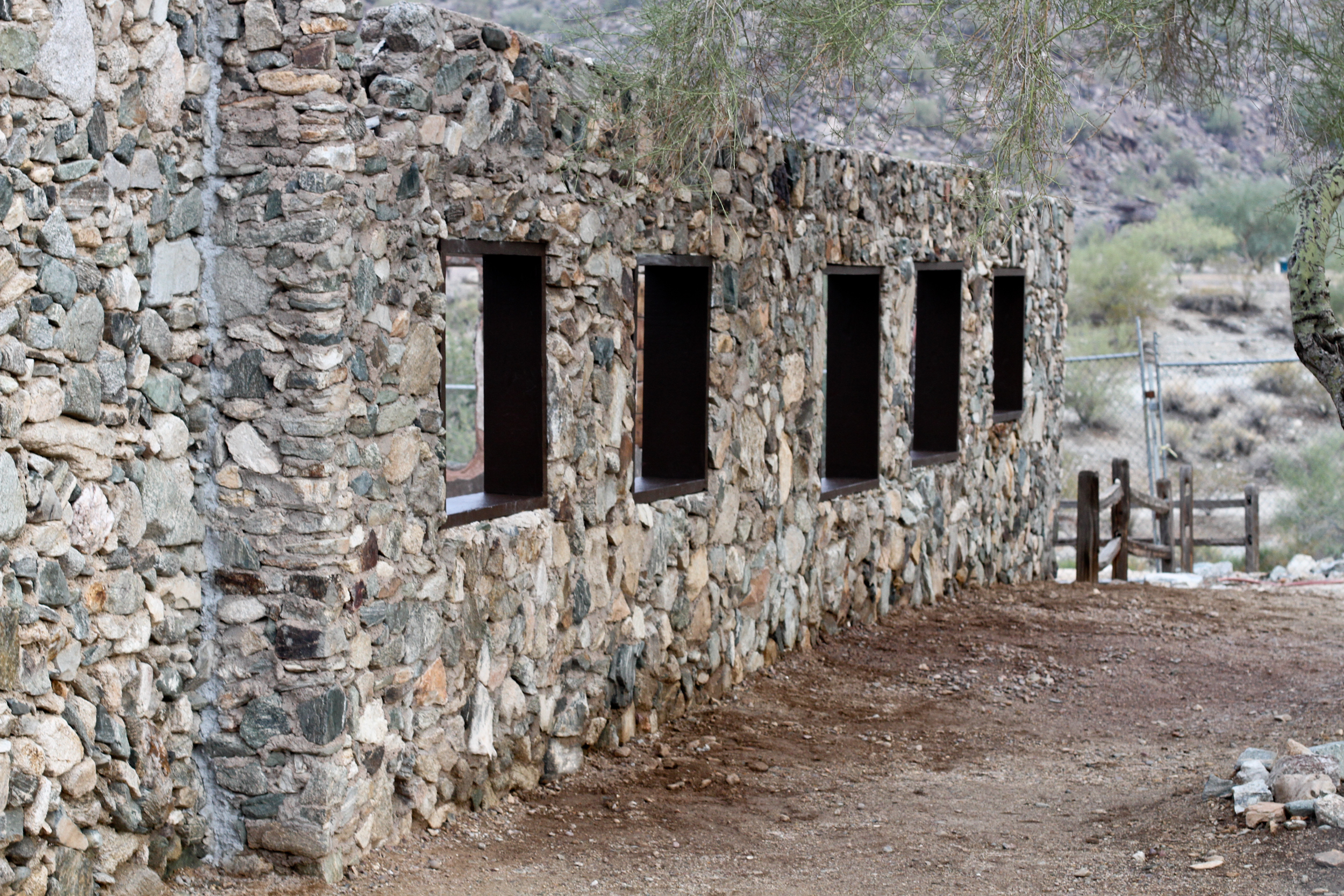
New wooden window frames.

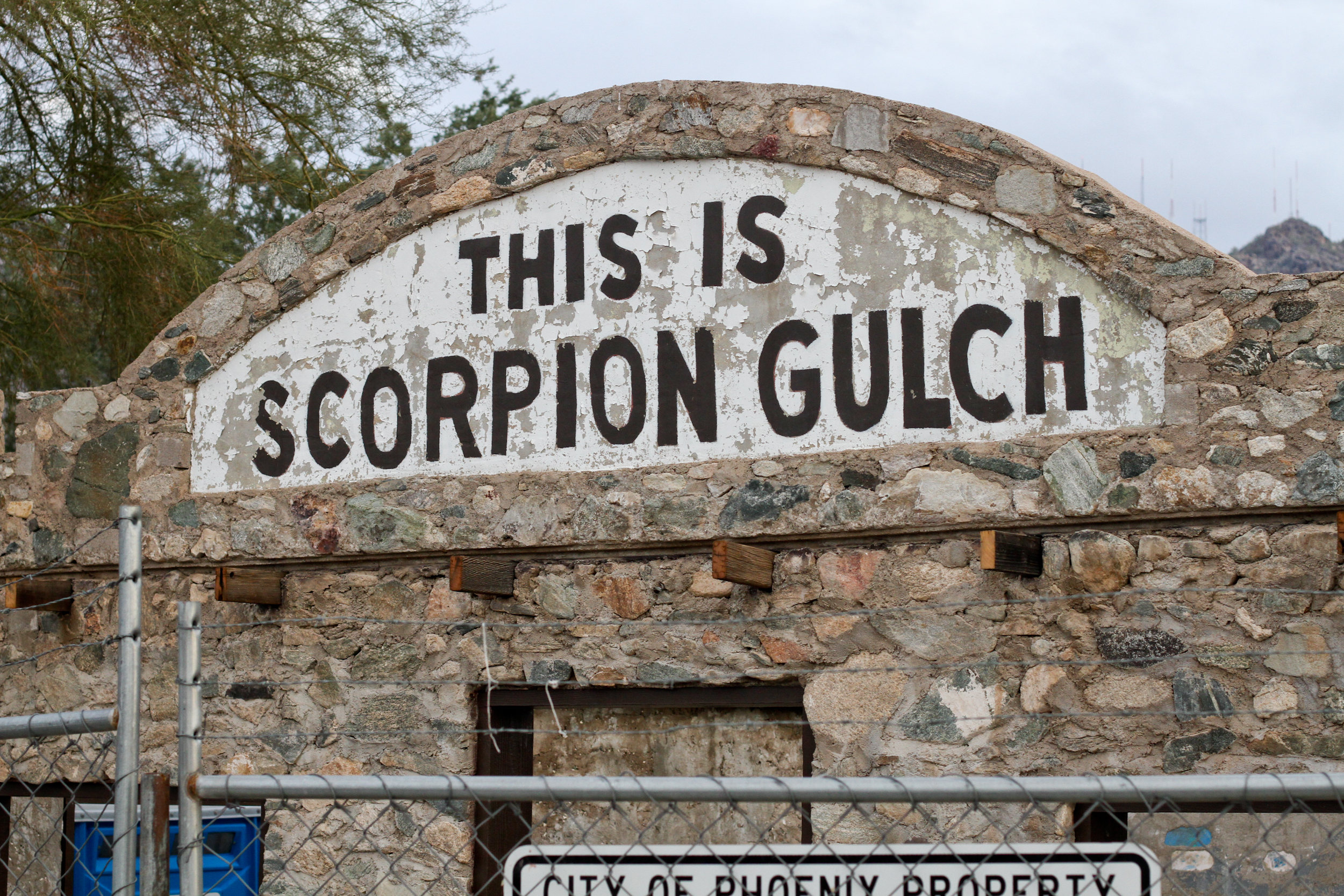
Scorpion Gulch sign taken during construction.

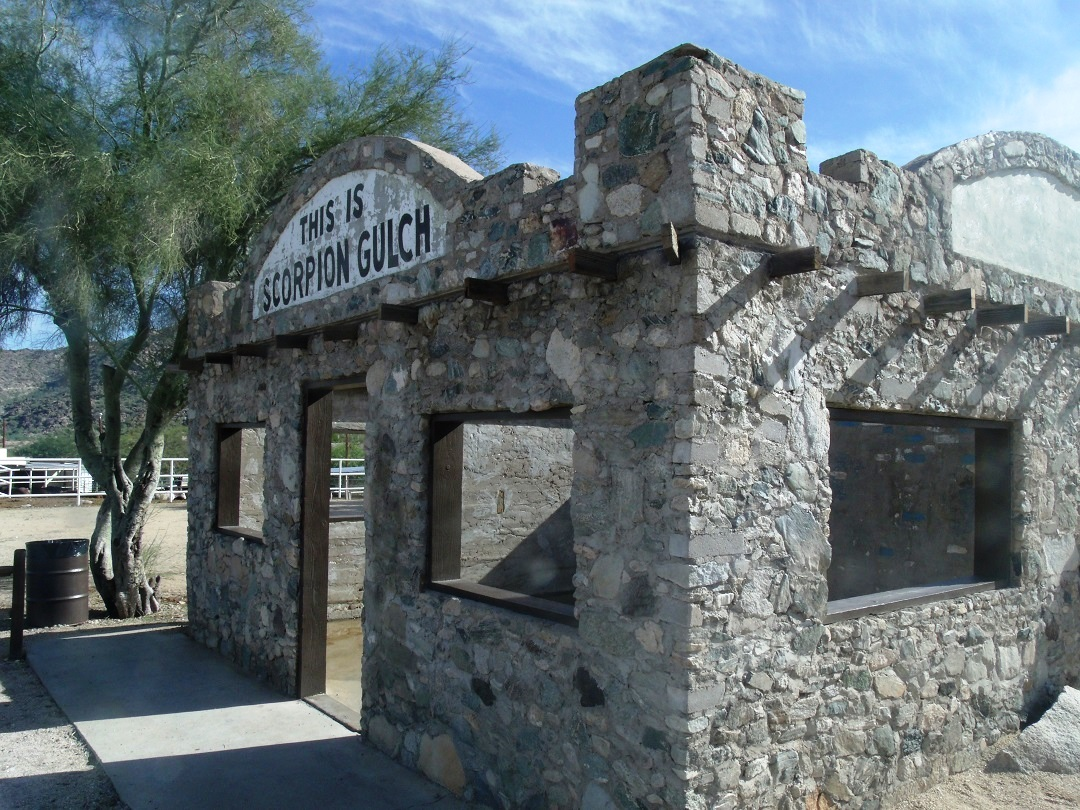
Different view of the Scorpion Gulch store.

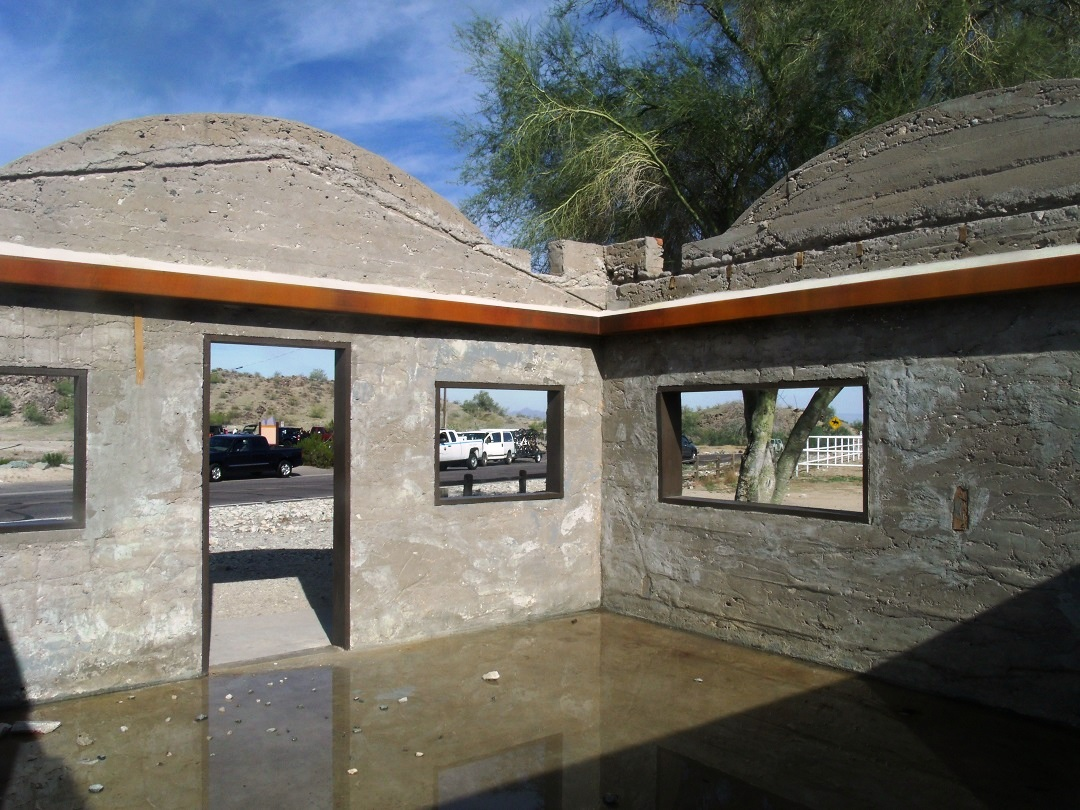
Inside view of the Scorpion Gulch store.

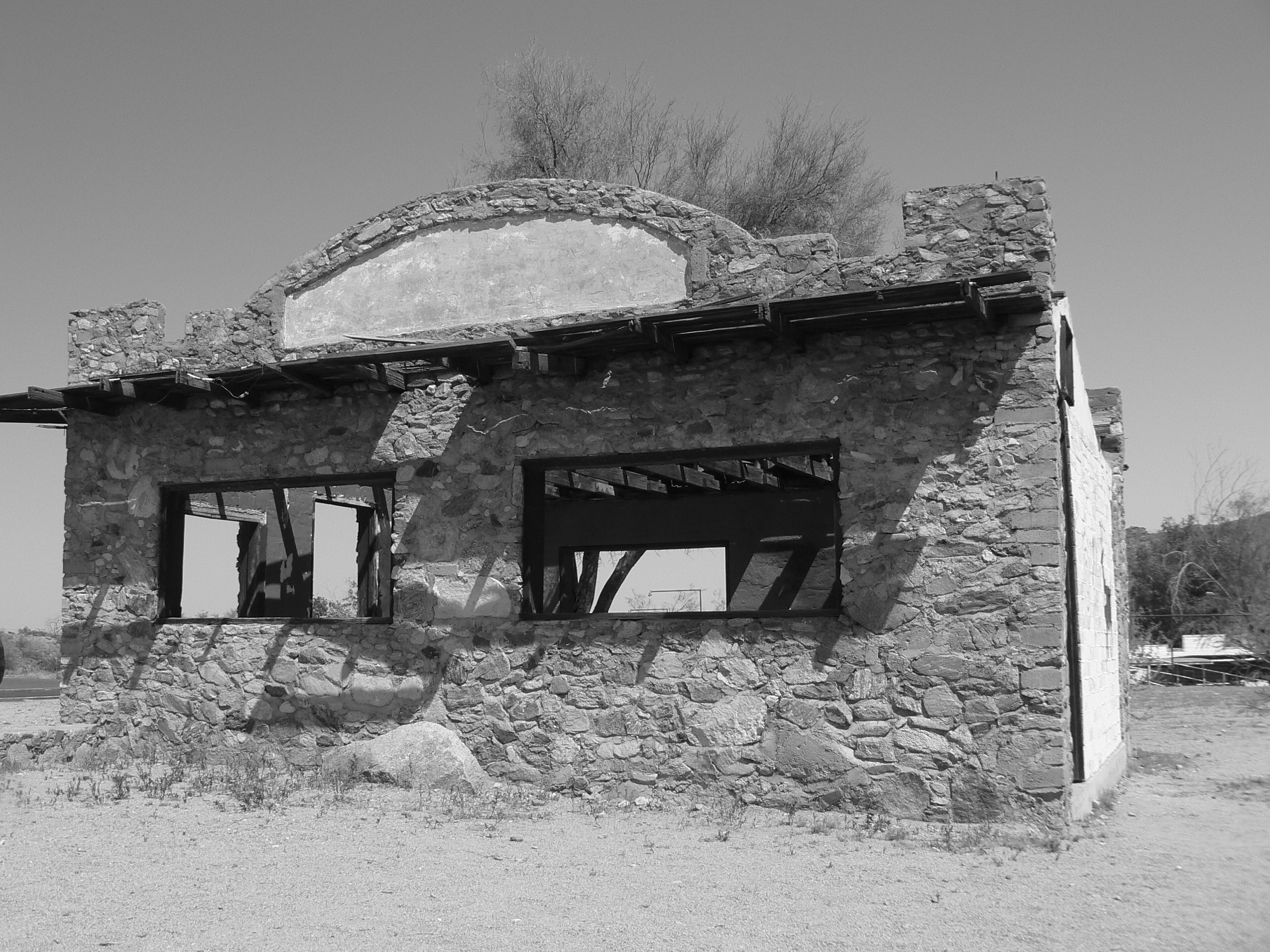
2009 photo

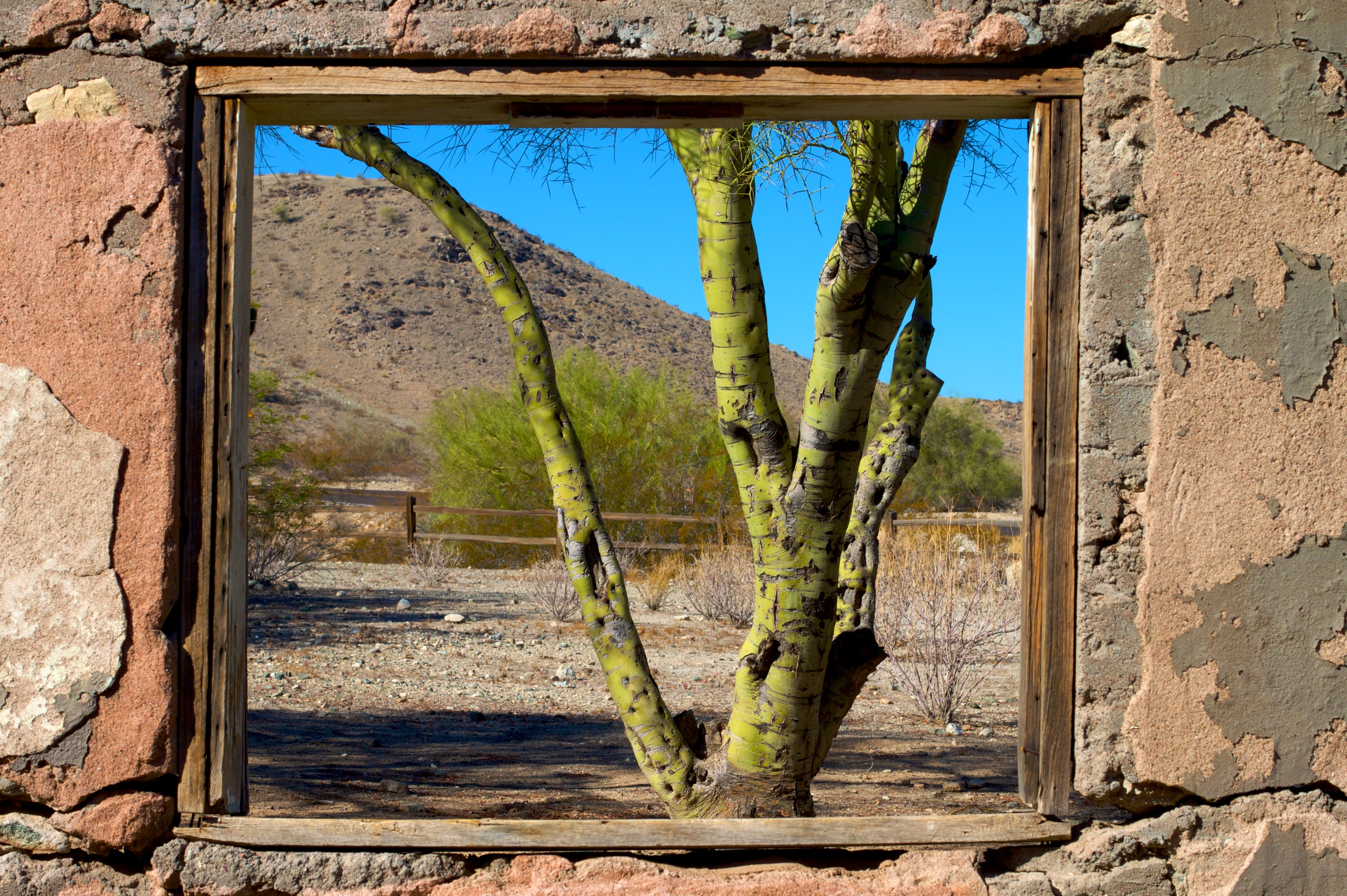
Palo Verde view

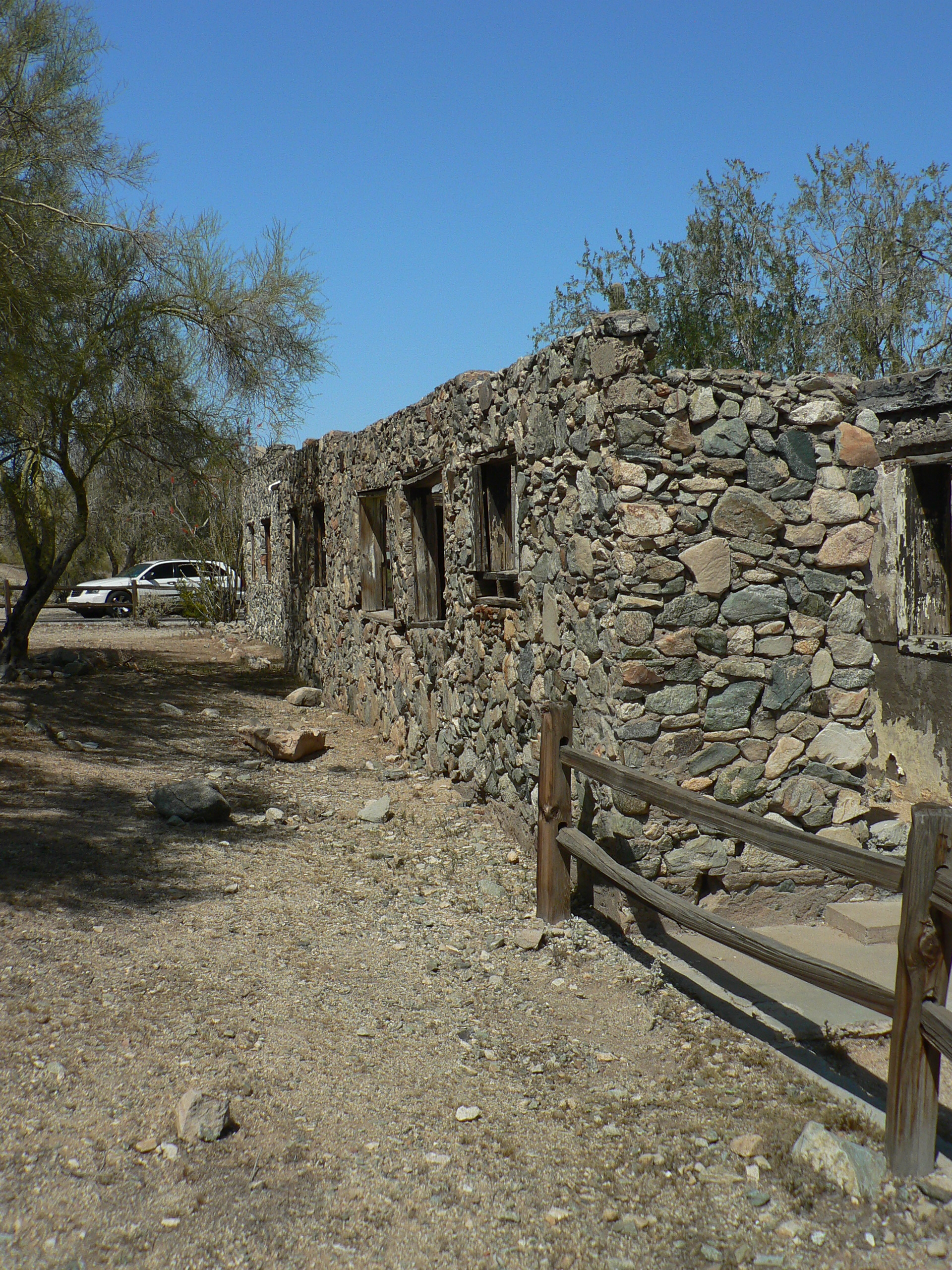
Side view

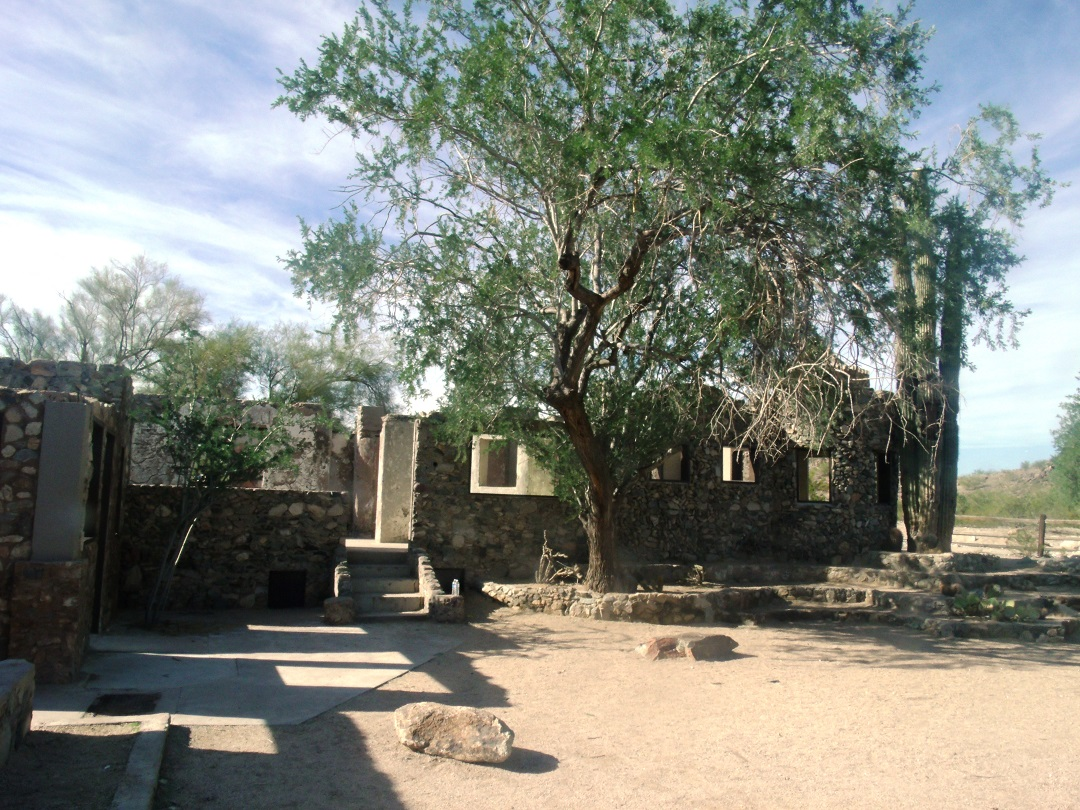
The ruins of the Scorpion Gulch residence. The residence is located at 10225 S. Central Ave, in South Mountain Park in Phoenix, Arizona. The property was listed in the Phoenix Historic Property and Preservation Register in October of 1990.

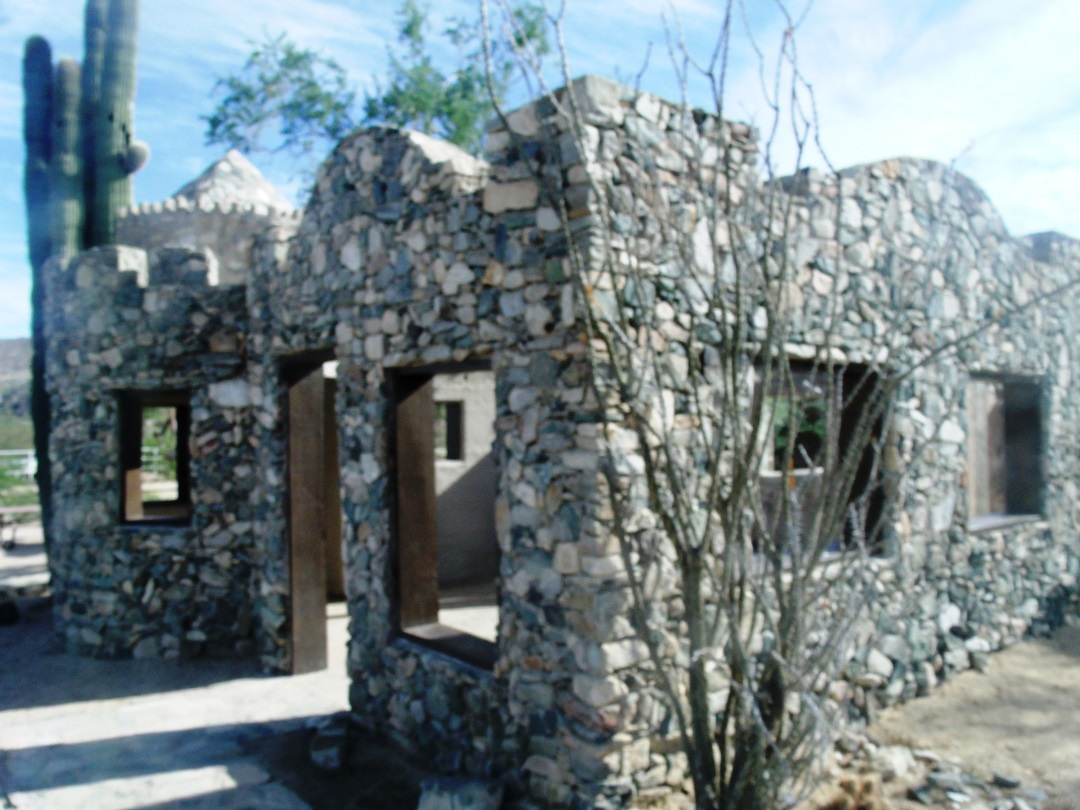
Front view of the ruins of the Scorpion Gulch residence.

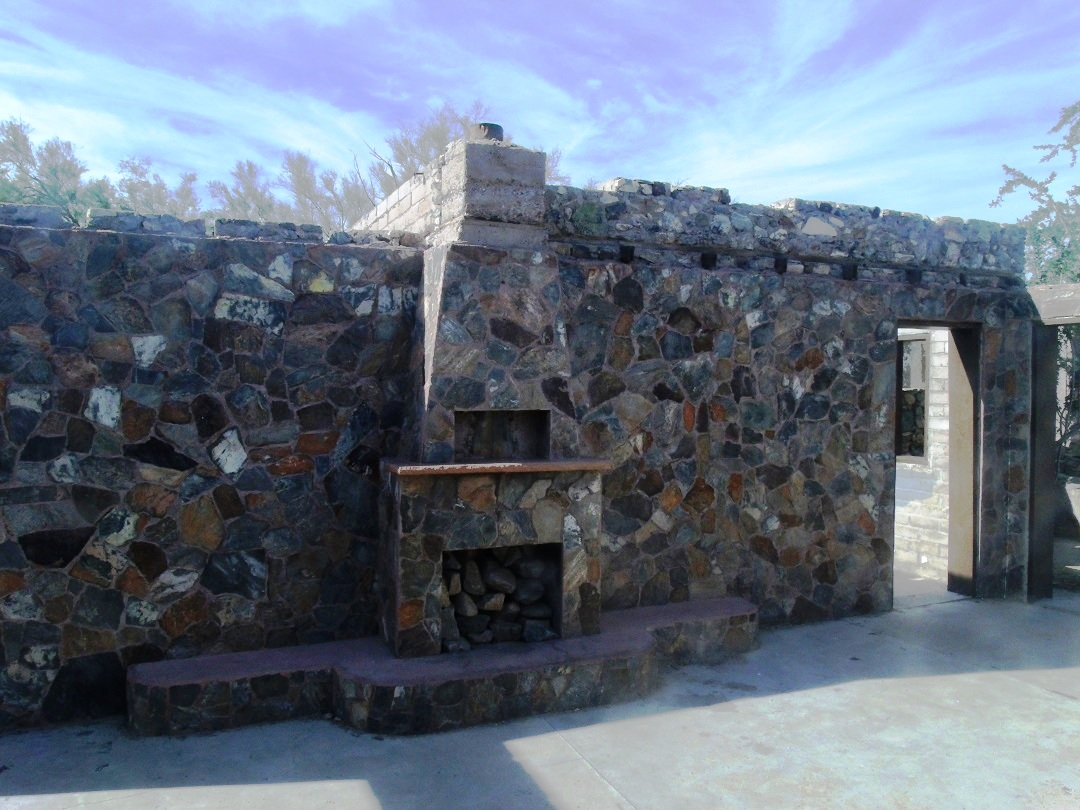
The main room (living room) of the ruins of the Scorpion Gulch residence.

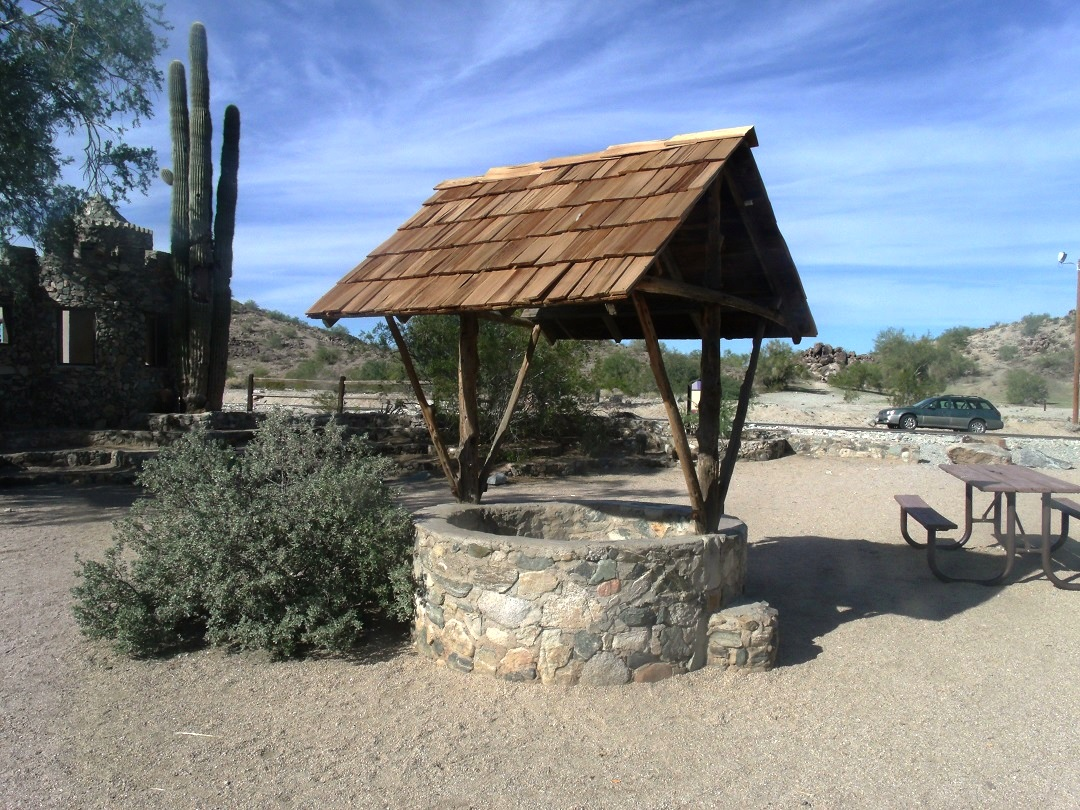
The Scorpion Gulch Well.

== See also ==
- List of historic properties in Phoenix, Arizona
- Phoenix Historic Property Register
