= Sixth =

Sixth is the ordinal form of the number six.

- The Sixth Amendment, to the U.S. Constitution
- A keg of beer, equal to 5 U.S. gallons or 1/6 barrel
- The fraction 1/6

== Music ==
- Sixth interval (music)s:
  - major sixth, a musical interval
  - minor sixth, a musical interval
  - diminished sixth, an interval produced by narrowing a minor sixth by a chromatic semitone
  - augmented sixth, an interval produced by widening a major sixth by a chromatic semitone
- Sixth chord, two different kinds of chord
- Submediant, sixth degree of the diatonic scale
- Landini sixth, a type of cadence
- Sixth (interval)

== Places ==
- 6th meridian east, a line of longitude extending through Europe and Africa
- 6th meridian west, a line of longitude extending through Europe and Africa
- 6th parallel north, a circle of latitude above the Equator
- 6th parallel south, a circle of latitude below the Equator
- 6th Street (disambiguation)
- Sixth Avenue (disambiguation)

== Time ==
- 6th century
- 6th century BC

=== Dates ===
- Sixth of the month, a recurring calendar date
  - Sixth of January
  - Sixth of February
  - Sixth of March
  - Sixth of April
  - Sixth of May
  - Sixth of June
  - Sixth of July
  - Sixth of August
  - Sixth of September
  - Sixth of October
  - Sixth of November
  - Sixth of December

== Other uses ==
- The Sixth (1981 film), a Soviet film directed by Samvel Gasparov
- The Sixth (2024 film), an American documentary film directed by Andrea Nix Fine and Sean Fine
- The 6ths, a band created by Stephin Merritt
- LaSexta (lit. The Sixth), a Spanish television channel

== See also ==
- 1/6 (disambiguation)
