= South Mountain Park =

Municipal park in Phoenix, Arizona

- Interactive map of South Mountain Park
- Location: Phoenix, Arizona, U.S.
- Coordinates: 33.336111111111°N 112.06944444444°W
- Area: 16,283 acres (65.89 km^{2})
- Designated: 1924
- Owner: City of Phoenix

South Mountain Park in Phoenix, Arizona, is the largest municipal park in the United States, and one of the largest urban parks in North America and in the world. It has been designated as a Phoenix Point of Pride.

== Geography and ecology ==
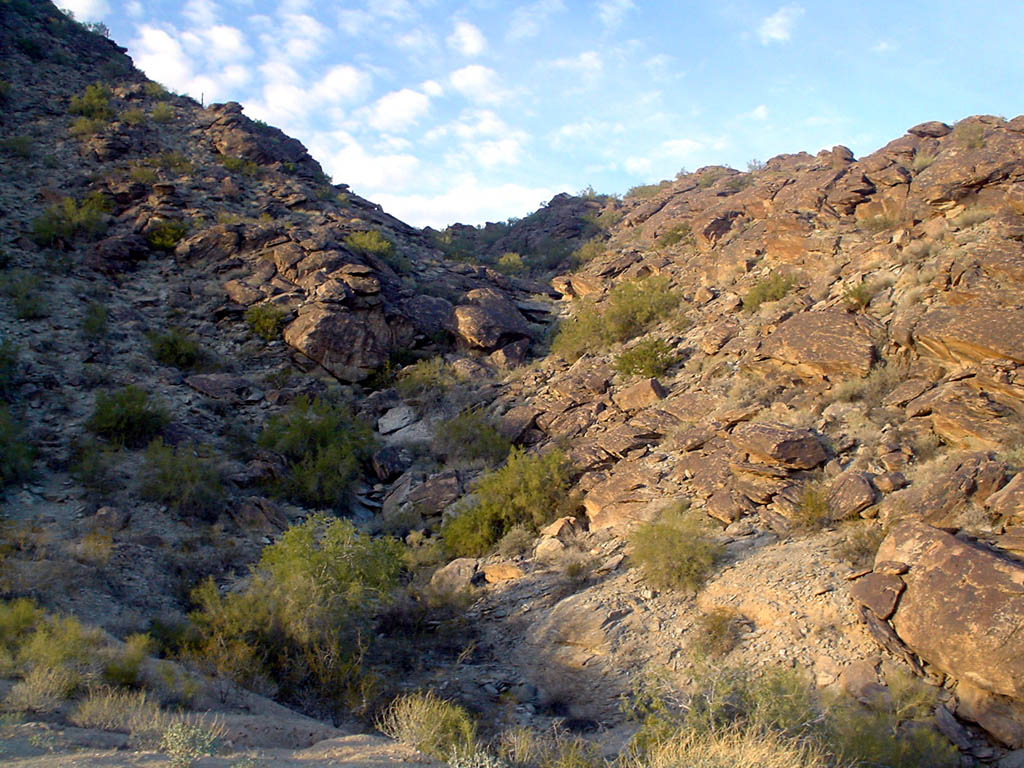
Winter on South Mountain

South Mountain Park preserves in a natural state a mountainous area of 16,283 acres (65.89 km^{2}) or approximately 25.5 sq mi (66 km^{2}) of native desert vegetation. Originally called Phoenix Mountain Park, it was formed in 1924 when President Calvin Coolidge sold its initial 13,000 acres (53 km^{2}) to the city of Phoenix for $17,000. It has since been expanded through bond programs during the 1970s into the early 1980s. It is located south of central Phoenix, hence the name. Since the naming, suburban growth has nearly surrounded the park. Ahwatukee now borders to the south and Laveen to the west.

South Mountain was originally known as the Salt River Mountains. The original mountain park committee consisted of J.C. Dobbins, chairman of the Phoenix city planning commission, Mrs. John Hampton, and H.B. Wilkinson. Dobbins Road, named after J.C. Dobbins, runs east and west just north of the park.

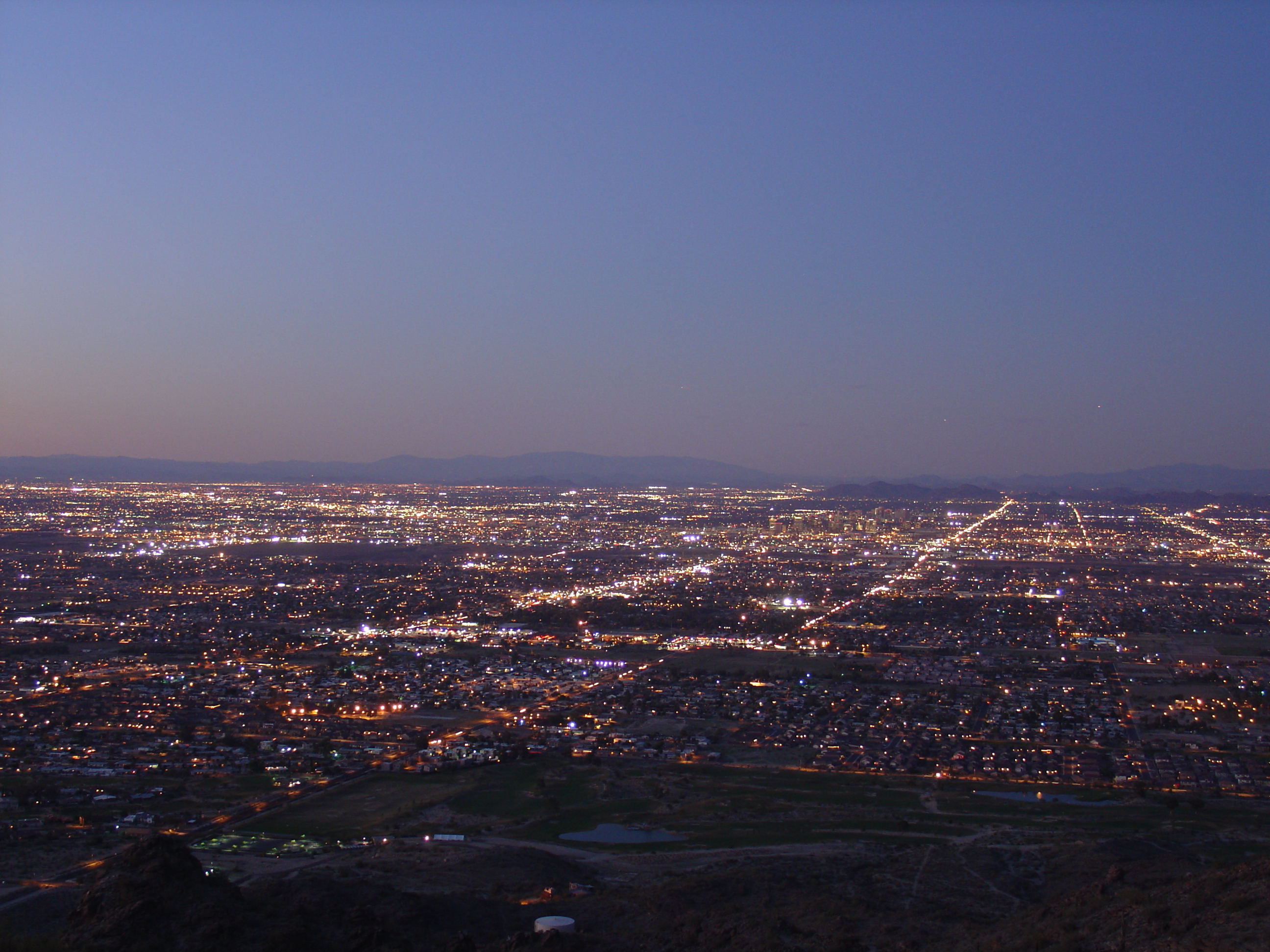
Twilight over Phoenix from South Mountain Park

The park's lookout point rises over 1000 feet (305 m) above the desert floor. Beyond the roads leading to ramadas and the summit, the park features 58 miles (93 km) of trails for cycling, hiking and horseback riding. Much of the original park infrastructure was constructed by the Civilian Conservation Corps in the early 1930s. The landmark Mystery Castle is located within its foothills. The Maricopa Trail and Sun Circle Trails pass through the South Mountain Park.

There is a variety of flora and fauna within South Mountain Park. One of the most notable flora is the Elephant tree (Bursera microphylla), which exhibits multiple contorted trunk architecture.

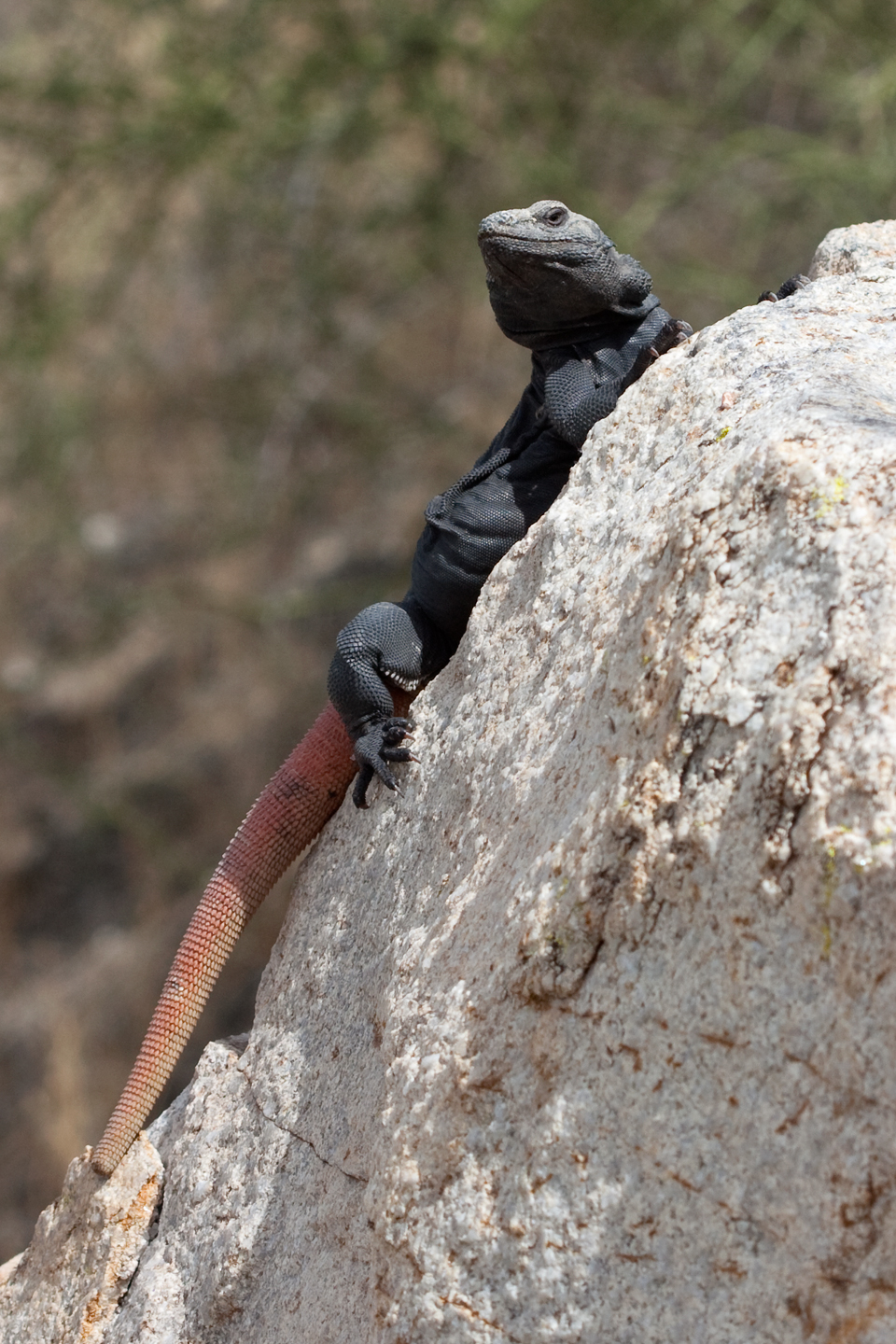
A "carrot tailed" Chuckwalla at South Mountain Park

South Mountain Park is also notable for its chuckwalla population. With an average of 65 chuckwallas per hectare, South Mountain has the highest density of chuckwallas that has ever been reported. Further, male chuckwallas at South Mountain exhibit a "carrot tail" phenotype, which is unique to this population.

== See also ==
- List of historic properties in Phoenix, Arizona
- South Mountains (Arizona)
- Scorpion Gulch
- Marcos de Niza
