= Sixth Avenue Line =

Sixth Avenue Line may refer to any of the following transit lines in Manhattan, New York City:

- IRT Sixth Avenue Line, often called the Sixth Avenue Elevated or Sixth Avenue El, constructed in the 1870s, closed in 1938 and razed in 1939
- IND Sixth Avenue Line, a subway line established 1936–1940 to replace the Sixth Avenue Elevated
- Sixth Avenue Line (Manhattan surface), a streetcar line opened in 1852 and replaced in 1936 by bus service, later rerouted to Broadway and absorbed into the M5 route
- Uptown Hudson Tubes, a PATH line that was built in 1908 and is now located between the IND Sixth Avenue Line
