= Sixth of the month =

Recurring ordinal calendar date

The sixth of the month or sixth day of the month is the recurring calendar date position corresponding to the day numbered 6 of each month. In the Gregorian calendar (and other calendars that number days sequentially within a month), this day occurs in every month of the year, and therefore occurs twelve times per year.

- Sixth of January
- Sixth of February
- Sixth of March
- Sixth of April
- Sixth of May
- Sixth of June
- Sixth of July
- Sixth of August
- Sixth of September
- Sixth of October
- Sixth of November
- Sixth of December

In addition to these dates, this date occurs in months of many other calendars, such as the Bengali calendar and the Hebrew calendar.

== See also ==
- Sixth (disambiguation)
