= Six of One =

Six of One or Six of One, Half Dozen of the Other may refer to:

== Film and television ==
- Six of One, an animated short film, 2000
- "Six of One" (Battlestar Galactica), a 2008 episode of the TV series
- "Six of One", a 2007 episode of children's TV series Numberjacks
- "Six of One", a 1991 episode of The Bill
- Six of One, a character in TV series Tripping the Rift
- Six of One, the TV series The Prisoner appreciation society
- Six of One, one of the original names for the TV series Friends
- Seven of One, a 1973 British comedy series, originally to be called Six of One

== Literature ==
- Six of One (novel), by Rita Mae Brown, 1978
- Six of One by Half a Dozen of the Other, an 1872 novel by Harriet Beecher Stowe and others
- "Six of One", a short story published in The Short Stories of F. Scott Fitzgerald, 1932
- Six of One, Half-dozen of the Other, a 2015 cartoon book by Foust

== Music ==
- Six of One, Half-Dozen of the Other, the US version of the 1992 Marillion album A Singles Collection
- Six of One, a 1983 album by Mach One
- Six of One, a 1970 Pink Floyd bootleg recording
- Six of One, a 1980 album by Evan Parker
- Six of One, a 2019 album by David Berkman
- Six of One, a 1997 album by Enda Kenny
- Six of One, Half a Dozen of the Other, a 1967 album by Del Reeves
- Six of One, Half a Dozen of the Other, a 1996 album by Howard Werth
- Six of One, Half a Dozen of the Other: 1986–2002, a 2005 album by Snuff
- Six of One..., a box set by Squeeze that includes their first six albums expanded with bonus tracks
- Six of One..., a 2007 EP by Thunder
- "Six of One", a song by Janet Feder and Fred Frith from the 2006 album Ironic Universe
- "Six of One", a song by New Riders of the Purple Sage from the 20912 album 17 Pine Avenue
- "Six of One", a song by Gaelic Storm from the 2015 album Matching Sweaters
- "Six of One", a song by The Tear Garden from the 2000 album Crystal Mass
- "Six of One, Half a Dozen of the Other", a song by Joe Nichols from the 1996 album Joe Nichols
  - Six of One, Half Dozen of the Other, the title of the 2002 reissue of Joe Nichols
- "Six of One and Half a Dozen of the Other", a song by The Ex from the 1982 album History Is What's Happening

== Other uses ==
- Six of One, a 1964 play by Francis Essex

== See also ==
- Irreversible binomial, a group of words used together in fixed order as an idiomatic expression, like "Six of One, Half Dozen of the Other"
- 6/1 (disambiguation)
