= Sixth Avenue Electronics =

Springfield, New Jersey-based retail chain

Sixth Avenue Electronics was a Springfield, New Jersey–based retail chain of consumer electronics stores, with locations in New Jersey and New York. The company was founded by Billy and Leon Temiz on Manhattan's Sixth Avenue in New York City in 1984, though following litigation in the early 2000s, the company eventually came to be owned by Billy and their youngest brother, Mike, after which the chain expanded to 19 locations.

The company began to decline in the late 2000s, and following defaults on its credit, a fifty percent sale of the company to online electronics vendor Albert Houllou, and a threat of seizure by GE Capital, the company was ordered shut down by a US District Court restraining order, and placed into liquidation, pending complaints filed against it by consumers, and the recouping of money owed to its creditors.

Sixth Avenue's collapse is unusual, even for a consumer electronics retail chain, despite the fact that other New Jersey–based electronics chains experienced a rise and collapse even more quickly. The Temiz brothers attributed the company's fall to the weak late 2000s economy, increased interest rates and diminished demand for televisions following the rise in popularity of the Internet, while former employees, competitors, creditors and those handling the company's liquidation attributed its collapse to poorly-timed, overly ambitious expansion, poor inventory management, and the brothers' hubris.

As of July 2012, Albert Houllou owns the rights to the Sixth Avenue name and website, which launched on Amazon.com as a featured merchant. It is now known as 6Ave online, and has an office as 6th Avenue Express LLC at 50 Atrium Drive, Somerset, NJ 08873.

== History ==
=== Founding, litigation and expansion ===
Billy and Leon Temiz opened Sixth Avenue Electronics on Manhattan's Sixth Avenue in New York City in 1984. Their youngest brother, Mike, soon joined them. The company opened its first suburban store in 1989, on Route 4 in Paramus, New Jersey, after which it began to evolve into a chain of upscale suburban showrooms, moving its corporate headquarters to Springfield in 1991.

In late 2001, a conflict developed among the three Temiz brothers that resulted in litigation. Leon at the time was the sole voting shareholder of the Sixth Avenue board, while Billy and Mike were non-voting members. After a dispute over use of company funds, Leon removed Billy and Mike from the board in December 2001. In a 2002 complaint, Leon sought damages from his brothers for stealing computer data and financial records, stating that they also "had engaged in improper conduct with respect to certain company funds." Billy and Mike countersued, accusing Leon of unfairly ousting them from the company and withholding money from them. In 2003 the brothers entered arbitration to structure a buyout or sale of the company. Leon sold his stake to Billy and Mike. In a 2010 interview with The Record, he explained that he did this because he grew tired of the conflict. He later founded a rival chain, Electronics Expo, based in Wayne, New Jersey.

Beginning in 2004, Billy and Mike began expanding Sixth Avenue rapidly, opening 11 stores over the next six years and expanding into new markets. The two brothers purchased luxurious homes in Saddle River, New Jersey with the fruits of their success. In 2007, Mike Temiz told the consumer electronics trade magazine Twice that Sixth Avenue, then a $250 million company, had a strategy to reach $1 billion in sales by 2012.

=== Decline and closing ===
In 2009, sales were increasing despite a weak economy, and Billy and Mike decided to capitalize on the closing of the 700-store Circuit City by opening new stores and buying retail properties with expensive mortgages, increasing the company's expenses at a time when competition from the Internet was causing television prices to drop, to the detriment of electronics vendors. These problems were exacerbated by the 2005 purchase of an inventory operating system that proved to be faulty. According to one employee, the system at times would erroneously count sales twice, registering as if two items had been sold instead of one, and at other times would fail to remove a sold item from inventory. In early 2010, the company attempted to sell refrigerators, dishwashers, and other kitchen and laundry appliances in its stores. This initiative was unsuccessful, and as a result, Sixth Avenue began to lose lines of credit, slowing the supply of goods it relied on for its high sales volume that fueled cash flow. Later that November, two weeks before Black Friday, one of the retail industry's biggest sales days of the year, the company switched back to its prior computer platform without doing a physical inventory count to check the numbers on the computers, making the company's accounting even more haphazard. In early 2011, the company closed two Philadelphia-area stores it had opened six months earlier. By March, the company was in default on its line of credit from a division of GE Capital that advanced the company money to buy its inventory. As a result, it reached an agreement to pay GE Capital just over $9 million in installments.

By March 2011, the company's locations dropped from 19 at its peak to 10. In order to pay GE Capital, the Temiz brothers reluctantly sold a 50 percent stake in the company to Somerset, New Jersey-based online electronics vendor Albert Houllou for $15 million. However, this partnership only extended Sixth Avenue's future another six months. In September 2011, Sixth Avenue defaulted a second time on GE Capital loan. In October, with GE Capital threatening to seize the three remaining Sixth Avenue stores and the corporate headquarters and warehouse, GE Capital and Sixth Avenue agreed to a deal in which the Temiz brothers and Houllou signed the company over to Alco Capital Group of Closter, through an assignment for benefit of creditors, ABC plan.

On October 12, 2011, the company was court ordered shut down under a temporary restraining order issued by the US District Court because of defaults on payments to its main creditor. As of October 28, 2011, the company was in liquidation, which was expected to last 4-8 weeks, and 33 pending complaints pending against it filed by consumers. The Court assigned Alco Capital Group of Closter to recoup money owed to Sixth Avenue's creditors, and address lawsuits against it who may have received preferential payments from Sixth Avenue in the months before the company closed. Terrence Corrigan, an executive with Alco, predicted that recovery of those assets probably would likely not be resolved before the end of 2012.

In a deed of assignment filed in the Chancery Division of Superior Court in Union County on October 26, 2011, Sixth Avenue agreed to sign over all its inventory and other assets to Alco to be sold to pay GE Capital, which would allow Sixth Avenue to avoid bankruptcy. Although GE Capital believed that the credit it advanced to Sixth Avenue totaled $12 million in inventory still in stock in Sixth Avenue's three remaining stores and warehouses, the liquidation produced only approximately half that amount, due to, according to Corrigan, Sixth Avenue's poor inventory management and its careless record-keeping.

Sixth Avenue's chief financial officer, Sevan Semerciyan, attributed the inventory discrepancy to its sale by the liquidators for less than it was worth. Corrigan disputed this, saying that because liquidators are paid on the basis of what they raised through going-out-of-business sales, it is in their best interest to get the highest possible price. Sixth Avenue sold items for as much as 70 percent off in unofficial clearance sales during the middle of 2011. Following the company's collapse, one of its creditors, Toshiba, won a default judgment for $1.2 million after the Temiz brothers failed to respond to a lawsuit, and banks foreclosed against store properties owned by the brothers. Two of their real estate holding companies filed for bankruptcy protection approximately in July 2012. As of that date, Albert Houllou owns the rights to the Sixth Avenue name and website, which had recently launched on Amazon.com as a featured merchant. Amazon.com does not reveal the names or business addresses of its featured merchants.

=== Analysis ===
Sixth Avenue's collapse is unusual, even for the "fast-and-loose" world of consumer electronics retailing, despite the fact that other New Jersey-based chains like Nobody Beats the Wiz, Topps Appliance City and Crazy Eddie rose rapidly and collapsed even more quickly than Sixth Avenue did. According to John Laposky, managing editor of the consumer electronics trade publication TWICE, "They went from being a solid, small regional chain, to nothing in a matter of two or three years. You have to wonder what was going on behind the scenes." Billy and Mike Temiz blamed the weakened economy, increased interest rates and diminished demand for televisions for Sixth Avenue's collapse. However, former employees, competitors, creditors and those handling the company's liquidation attributed its collapse to poorly-timed, overly ambitious expansion, poor inventory management, and the brothers' hubris. According to a 2012 NorthJersey.com article by Joan Verdon, former employees and competitors also raised questions about whether the Temiz brothers, anticipating the collapse of their company, took steps to benefit Sixth Avenue at the expense of creditors.

=== Name purchased ===
As of July 2012, Albert Houllou owns the rights to the Sixth Avenue name and website, which launched on Amazon.com as a featured merchant. It is now known as 6Ave online, and has an office as 6th Avenue Express LLC at 50 Atrium Drive, Somerset, NJ 08873.

== General source ==
- "Sixth Avenue Electronics / 6th Ave", Reseller Ratings, archived from the original on September 9, 2012
