= 6th Avenue Hotel-Windsor Hotel =

- 6th Avenue Hotel - Windsor Hotel
- U.S. National Register of Historic Places
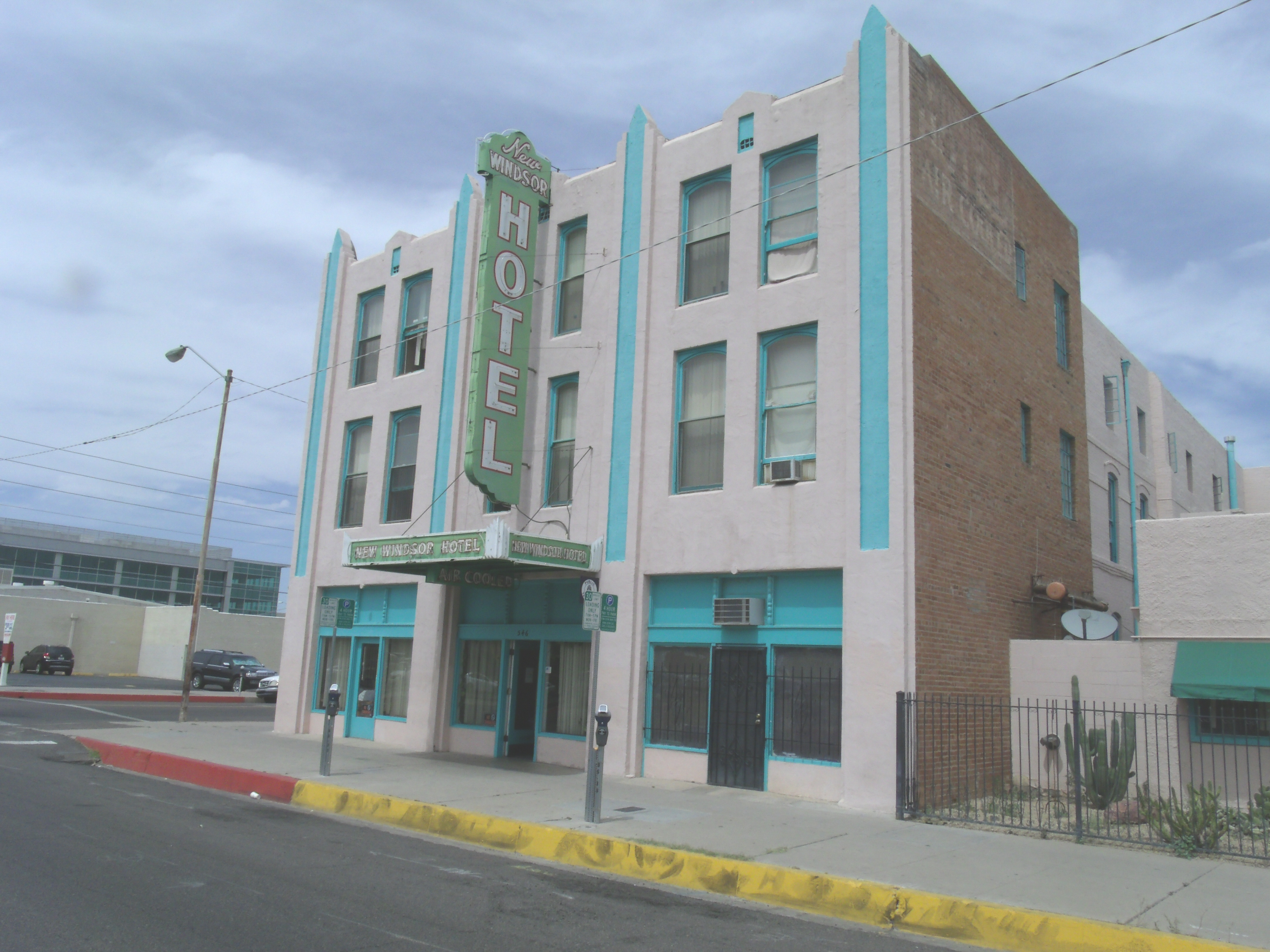
- The New Windsor Hotel

- Location within Arizona Location within the United States
- Location: 546 W. Adams Street Phoenix, Arizona
- Coordinates: 33°27′56″N 112°4′37″W
- Area: less than one acre
- Built: 1893
- Architectural style: Victorian
- NRHP reference No.: 85002041
- Added to NRHP: September 4, 1985

The 6th Avenue Hotel - Windsor Hotel, now known as the New Windsor Hotel, is the only 19th century hotel which is still in use in the Phoenix, Arizona, original town-site. It is listed in the National Register of Historic Places.

== History ==
In 1881, Phoenix was incorporated as a city. One of the first of several important events which revolutionized the economy of Phoenix was the establishment of a railroad system in the 1880s. Phoenix thus became the most important trade center in Arizona. In 1888, the city offices were moved into a new City Hall, at Washington Street and Central Avenue and in 1889, the territorial capital was moved from the town of Prescott to Phoenix. When the territorial capital was moved from Prescott to Phoenix in 1889 the temporary territorial offices were also located in City Hall.

The need for the establishment of hotels and living quarters was apparent. In 1893, Phoenix pioneer and businessman A.D. Walsh had a hotel erected on the corner of what is now known as 6th Avenue and Adams Street and named it the 6th Avenue Hotel. The proper address of the building, which originally was a two-story brick Victorian styled structure, is 546 W. Adams Street.

In 1925, the hotel was renamed the Windsor Hotel. In the 1930s the Windsor went through a remodeling process in which a third story was added. The third story brick structure has a stucco facade on the south and west walls. A front brick addition with casement windows mixed the Victorian architecture with a modern facade. In the 1950s, it was finally renamed the "New" Windsor Hotel.

No longer used as a hotel, it is now a low cost haven for the elderly poor in downtown Phoenix.

== National Register of Historic Places ==
The Windsor Hotel was added to National Register of Historic Places on September 4, 1985, and its reference number is 85002041. It is listed as the "6th Avenue Hotel-Windsor Hotel" also known as "47-9' According to the NRHP, the period of significance was 1875–1899.

== Gallery ==
Inside the New Windsor Hotel
(formerly the 6th Avenue Hotel - Windsor Hotel)
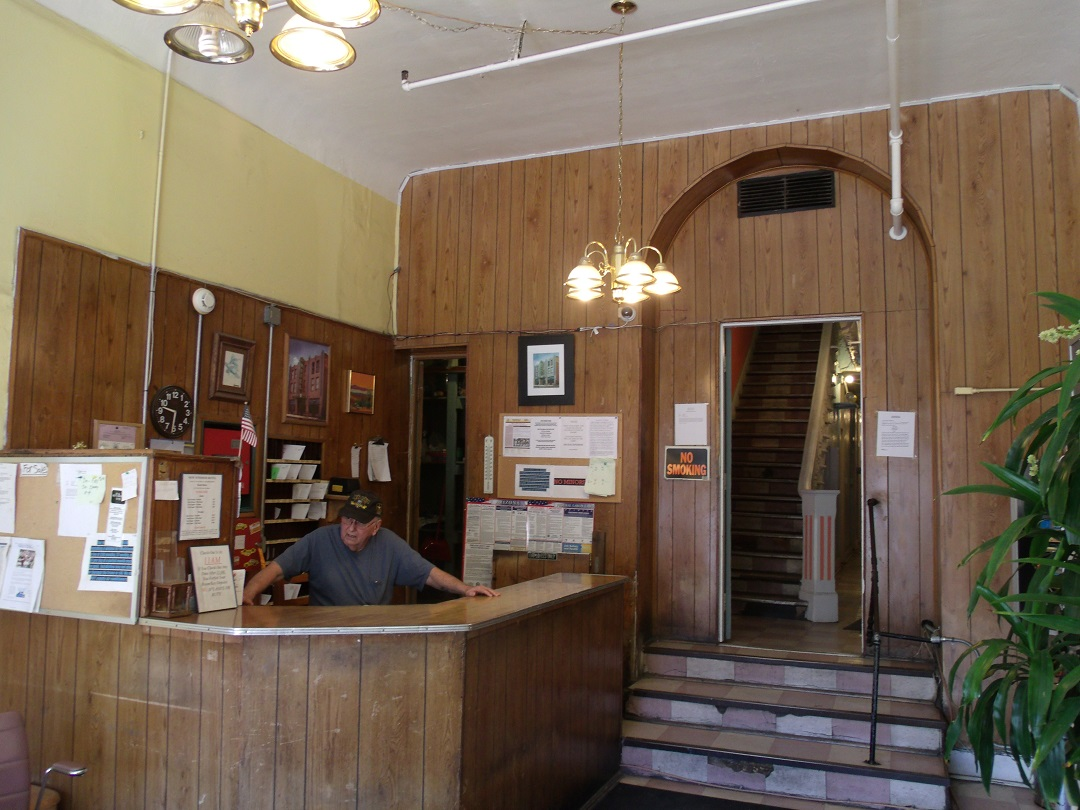
This is the service desk of the historic Windsor Hotel.

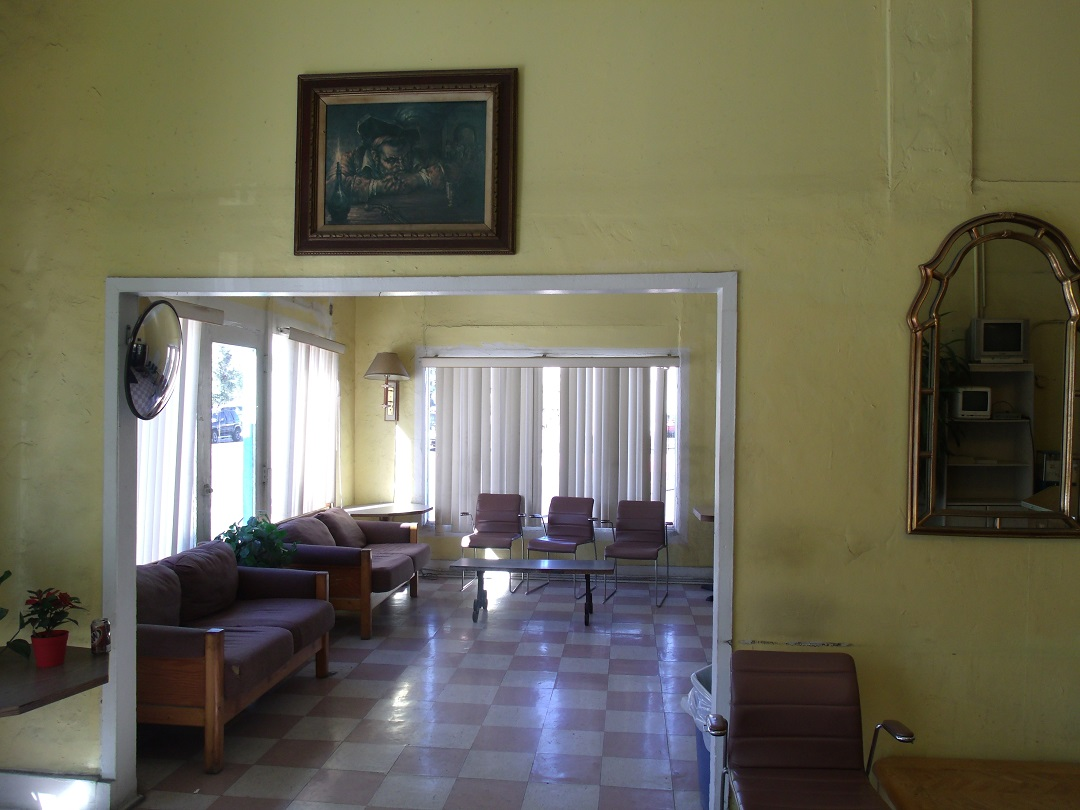
This is the hotel's lobby.

== See also ==
- History of Phoenix, Arizona
- Phoenix, Arizona
- Phoenix Historic Property Register
- List of historic properties in Casa Grande, Arizona
- List of historic properties in Chandler, Arizona
- List of historic properties in Florence, Arizona
- List of historic properties in Glendale, Arizona
- List of historic properties in Mesa, Arizona
- List of historic properties in Peoria, Arizona
- List of historic properties in Phoenix, Arizona
- List of historic properties in Tempe, Arizona
- List of National Historic Landmarks in Arizona
- National Register of Historic Places listings in Arizona

Other historic Phoenix structures in Phoenix

- Smurthwaite House
- El Cid Castle
- Squaw Peak Inn
