= 6th Street =

6th Street or Sixth Street may refer to:

== Places ==
- 6th Street (Augusta), Georgia
- 6th Street (Los Angeles), an east–west thoroughfare in California
- 6th Street (Manhattan), New York
- Sixth Street (Austin), a historic and entertainment district in Downtown Austin, Texas
- Sixth Street (Wells, Nevada), State Route 223
- 6th Street Marketplace, former shopping mall in Richmond, Virginia

== Other uses ==
- Sixth Street Partners, a global investment company
- Sixth Street (EP), 2015, by Yuna
