= Cid =

Cid may refer to:

- Cid (soil)
- Cubic inch (c.i.d., cid), a displacement unit for internal combustion engines
- Cid, a slang term for lysergic acid diethylamide (LSD)
- Content-ID, a URI scheme (cid:) that allows the use of MIME within email

== People ==
- El Cid (1043–1099), 11th-century Castilian nobleman
- Cid Corman (1924–2004), poet
- Cid Moreira (1927-2024), Brazilian news anchor
- Cid Samson (born 1943), Canadian politician
- Gérald Cid (born 1983), footballer
- Hilda Cid (born 1933), Chilean scientist
- Mauro Cid (born 1979), Brazilian military
- Sofía Cid (born 1971), Chilean politician

=== Fictional characters ===
- Cid (Final Fantasy), a recurring name of several characters throughout the Final Fantasy franchise
  - Cid Highwind, the "Cid" of Final Fantasy VII
  - Cindy Aurum, one of two "Cid" characters from Final Fantasy XV
- Cid the Dummy, the main protagonist of his eponymous video game
- Cid Scaleback, Trandoshan informant in the 2021 animated series Star Wars: The Bad Batch
- Cid Kagenou (シド・カゲノー) (known as Minoru Kageno (影野実) before reincarnation) from the light novel, manga and anime The Eminence in Shadow

== See also ==
- CID (disambiguation)
- El Cid (disambiguation)
- Sid (disambiguation)
