= Tovrea =

Tovrea is a surname. Notable people with the surname include:

- Edward A. Tovrea (1861–1932), American cattle baron
- Philip Edward Tovrea Jr. (1920–1982), American World War II veteran

== See also ==
- Tovrea Castle
- Tovrea Stockyards
