= CID =

CID may refer to:

== Film ==
Several Indian films have the mention of Criminal Investigation Department (as C.I.D.) in their title:

- C.I.D. (1955 film), an Indian Malayalam film
- C.I.D. (1956 film), an Indian Hindi film
- C. I. D. (1965 film), an Indian Telugu film
- C.I.D. (1990 film), an Indian Hindi film
- CID 999, an Indian film series including Goa Dalli CID 999 (1968) and Operation Jackpot Nalli C.I.D 999 (1969)

== Television ==
- CID (Indian TV series)
- C.I.D. (Singaporean TV series)

== Organizations ==
=== Police units ===
- Criminal Investigation Department (disambiguation)
- Criminal Investigation Division (disambiguation)
- United States Army Criminal Investigation Division

=== Other organizations ===
- Center for International Development, at Harvard University
- Central Institute for the Deaf, in St. Louis, Missouri
- Central Investigation Department, the intelligence and counter-intelligence agency of the Chinese Communist Party Central Committee from 1949 to 1983
- Committee of Imperial Defence, a former part of the government of Great Britain and the British Empire
- Conseil International de la Danse, an umbrella organization for all forms of dance in the world
- Council of Industrial Design, a UK body renamed the Design Council
- University of Colombo, Centre for Instrument Development, in Sri Lanka

== Science and technology ==
=== Biology and medicine ===
- Clinical Infectious Diseases, a medical journal
- Cytomegalic inclusion disease
- Chromosomal Interacting Domain, a self-interacting domain in bacteria

=== Chemistry ===
- Collision-induced dissociation, a mass spectrometry mechanism
- Compound identification number, a field in the PubChem database
- Configuration interaction doubles, in quantum chemistry

=== Computing and telecommunications ===
- Caller ID, a telephone service that transmits the caller's telephone number to the called party
- Card Identification Number, a security feature on credit cards
- Cell ID, used to identify cell phone towers
- Centro de Investigaciones Digitales of the Universidad de La Habana
- Certified Interconnect Designer, a certification for printed circuit-board designers
- CID fonts, a font file format
- Customer Induced Damage, a reason for rejection of a Return merchandise authorization

=== Other uses in science and technology ===
- Channel-iron deposits, one of the major sources of saleable iron ore
- Controlled Impact Demonstration, a project to improve aircraft crash survivability
- Cubic inch displacement, a measurement in internal combustion engines

== Other uses ==
- Centro Insular de Deportes, an indoor sports arena in Spain
- Chinatown–International District, Seattle
- CID The Dummy, a video game
- Combat Identification, the accurate characterization of detected objects for military action
- Common-interest development, a form of housing
- Community improvement district, an area within which businesses are required to pay an additional tax
- The Eastern Iowa Airport (IATA code CID), serving Cedar Rapids, Iowa
- Corpus des inscriptions de Delphes, a compendium of ancient Greek inscriptions from Delphi
- Cid (Final Fantasy), a recurring character in the Final Fantasy series
- CID, a robot character in Saints Row IV

== See also ==
- Cid (disambiguation)
- SID (disambiguation)
