= El Sid =

El Sid may refer to:

- "El Sid" (Sliders), a second season episode of the TV series Sliders
- Sid Fernandez (born 1962), an American Major League Baseball left-handed pitcher
- Sidney Moncrief (born 1957), an American retired professional basketball player
- Sidney Green (basketball) (born 1961), an American basketball player and coach

== See also ==
- El Cid (disambiguation)
