= Al-Sayyid =

Al-Sayyid may refer to:

- Sayyid, an Arabic honorific title denoting descendants of the Islamic prophet Muhammad
- Al-Sayyid Bedouin Sign Language
- al-Sayyid, Israel, a Bedouin village in the Southern District of Israel
- Al-Sayyid, Syria, a village

== See also ==
- El Cid (disambiguation)
- Sayyid (name)
