= El Cid Castle =

Former structure in Sunnyslope, Arizona, US

Coordinates: 33.5902°N 112.1010°W

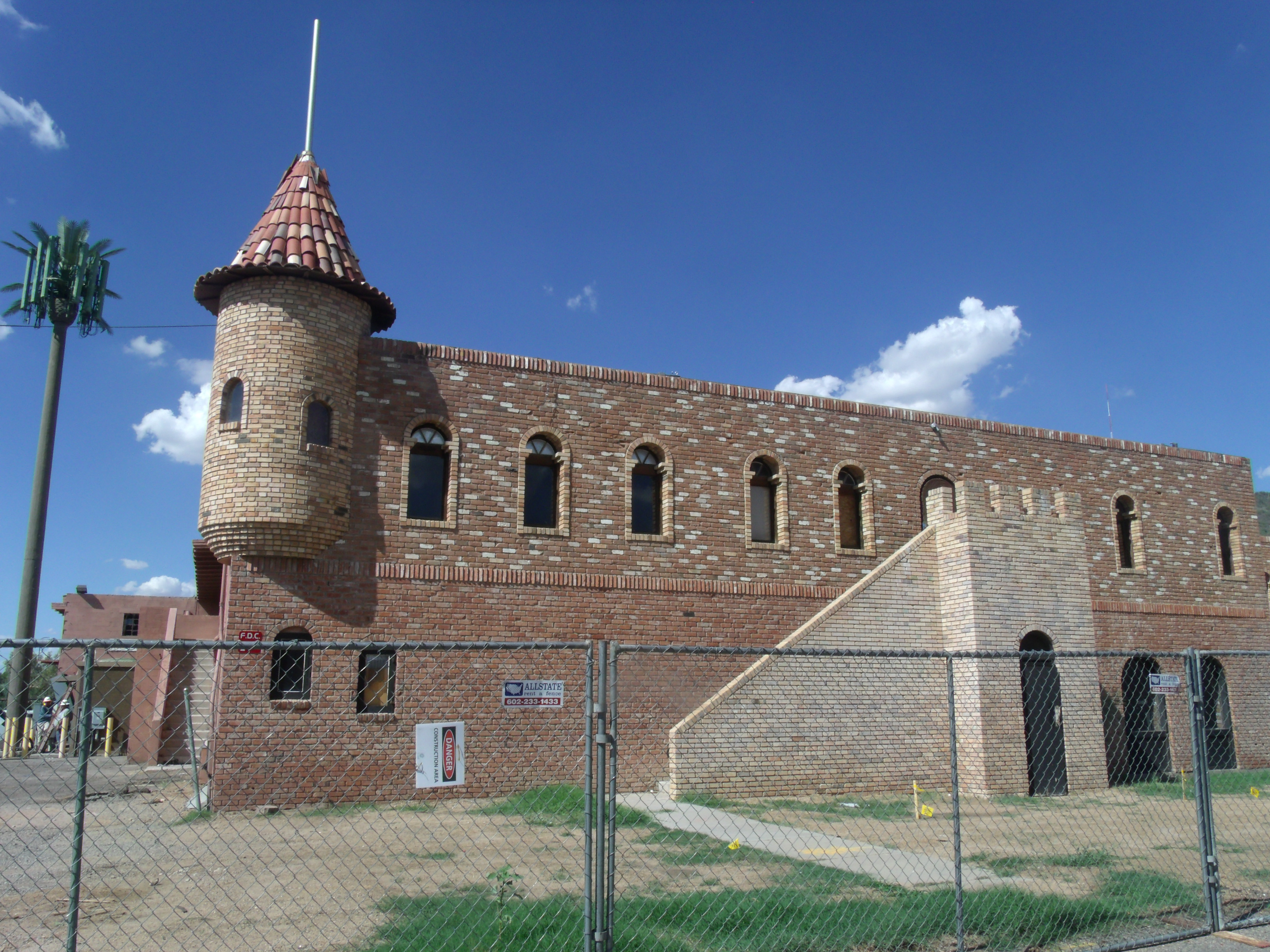
- Side view of the castle
- Interactive map of El Cid Castle

El Cid Castle was a landmark structure located on the opposite side of the western boundary of Sunnyslope, Arizona, at the corner of 19th Avenue and Cholla Drive. The controversial castle, built by the late Dr. Kenneth Hall, was supposed to be a bowling alley which resembled a Moorish Castle. Construction on the structure began in 1963 and was completed in 1980.

== History ==
=== Dr. Kenneth E. Hall ===
Dr. Kenneth E. Hall was born in Oklahoma. During World War II, Hall enlisted in the U.S. Army, graduated from the University of Arkansas Medical School, and was honorably discharged after a brief deployment to Italy in 1945. In 1948, he moved with his family to Phoenix, Arizona. Dr. Hall established clinics in South Phoenix and Sunnyslope (Sunnyslope was not part of Phoenix at the time). Dr. Hall wanted to be known as the “King of Sunnyslope” and built the biggest house in Sunnyslope. Sunnyslope had attempted to be incorporated as its own town on four occasions but failed every time. In 1959, the City of Phoenix annexed the community of Sunnyslope. By then, Dr. Hall operated the North Mountain Hospital, a 40-bed hospital in Sunnyslope, which he built in 1955. The hospital had a primate zoo located on the hospital grounds.

=== El Cid Castle ===
Dr. Hall felt that the growing population of Sunnyslope needed recreational facilities and therefore in 1963, he illegally diverted $16,564 in Medicare funds to help in the construction of a bowling alley which resembled a Moorish Castle. The castle was to be a 65,000-square-foot building under one roof in 20 acres of land at 19th Avenue and Cholla Street. The venture was to include thirty-two bowling alley lanes, an ice skating rink, four recreation rooms for teenagers and a snack bar. The castle was also supposed to include multiple nightclubs and a French restaurant. It was named "El Cid", after an 11th-century Spanish hero whose life was depicted in a film of the same name in 1961.

=== Downfall of Dr. Hall and closure of El Cid Castle ===
Dr. Hall believed that El Cid Castle would be the first of a nationwide chain of bowling allies which would be called Spanish Trails. However, the castle was completed in 1980, almost twenty years after its construction began. Various factors contributed to the downfall of Dr. Hall and the eventual failure of El Cid. Dr. Hall had been performing unsanctioned medical operations, and his physician's license was revoked in 1971 after four patients died during gastric bypass surgery. In 1974, he pleaded guilty to diverting thousands of dollars in Medicare funds to help build the castle. Dr. Hall was bankrupt, and in 1982 “El Cid Castle” bowling alley closed after one year of operation. Dr. Hall lost the building in order to settle a malpractice suit.

=== Later years ===
Dr. Hall died in 2001, at age 80, of heart failure. The building later served as a furniture store, an educational facility, church and a sports club. The structure, which was empty for sometime, was purchased by the State of Arizona for a new Department of Economic Security office complex. It was remodeled and no longer looks like a castle. In January 2015, the Arizona Department of Economic Security opened the doors of its new facility.

== Gallery ==
El Cid Castle
(Sunnyslope Historical Society and Museum)
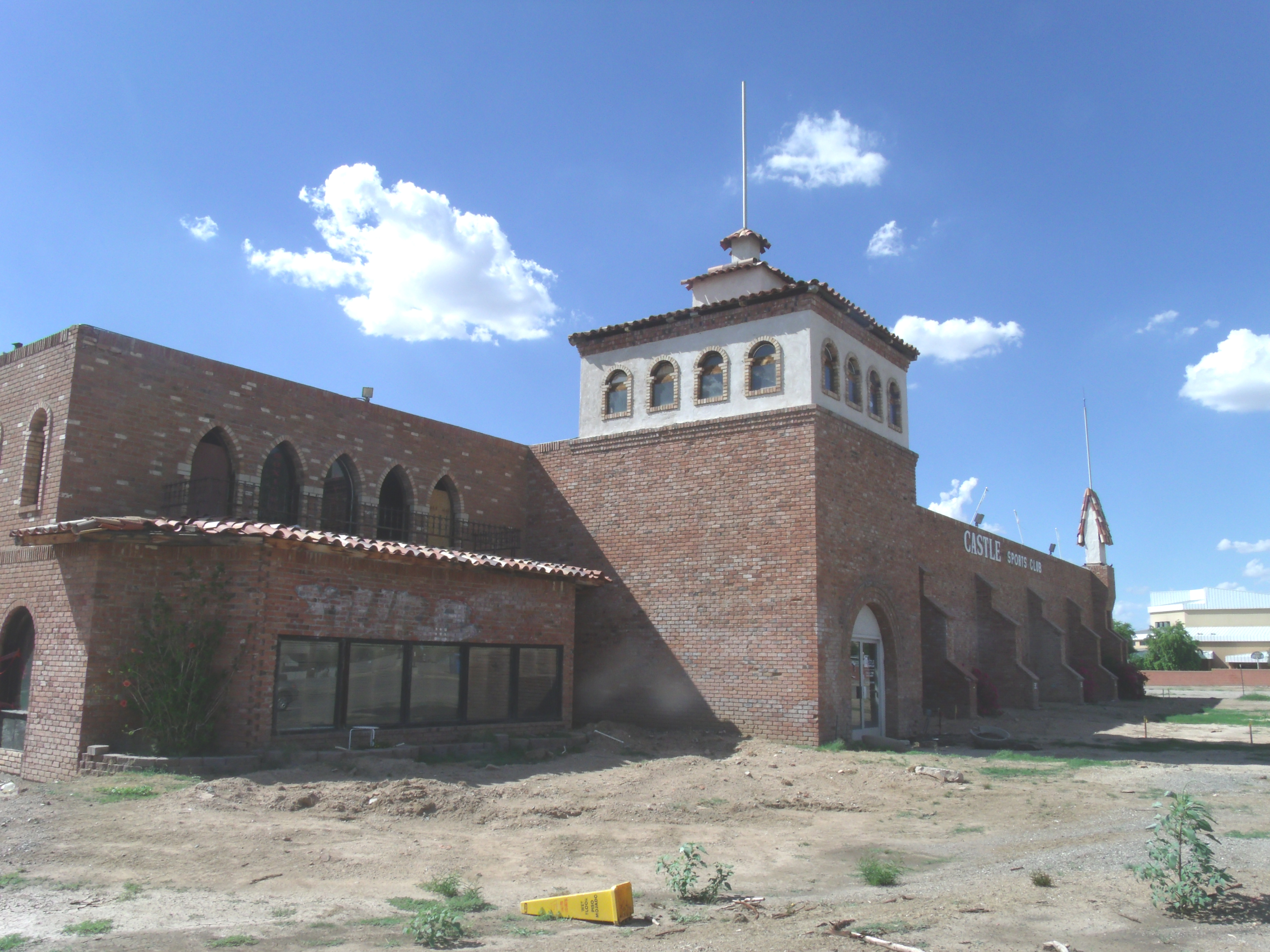
The castle

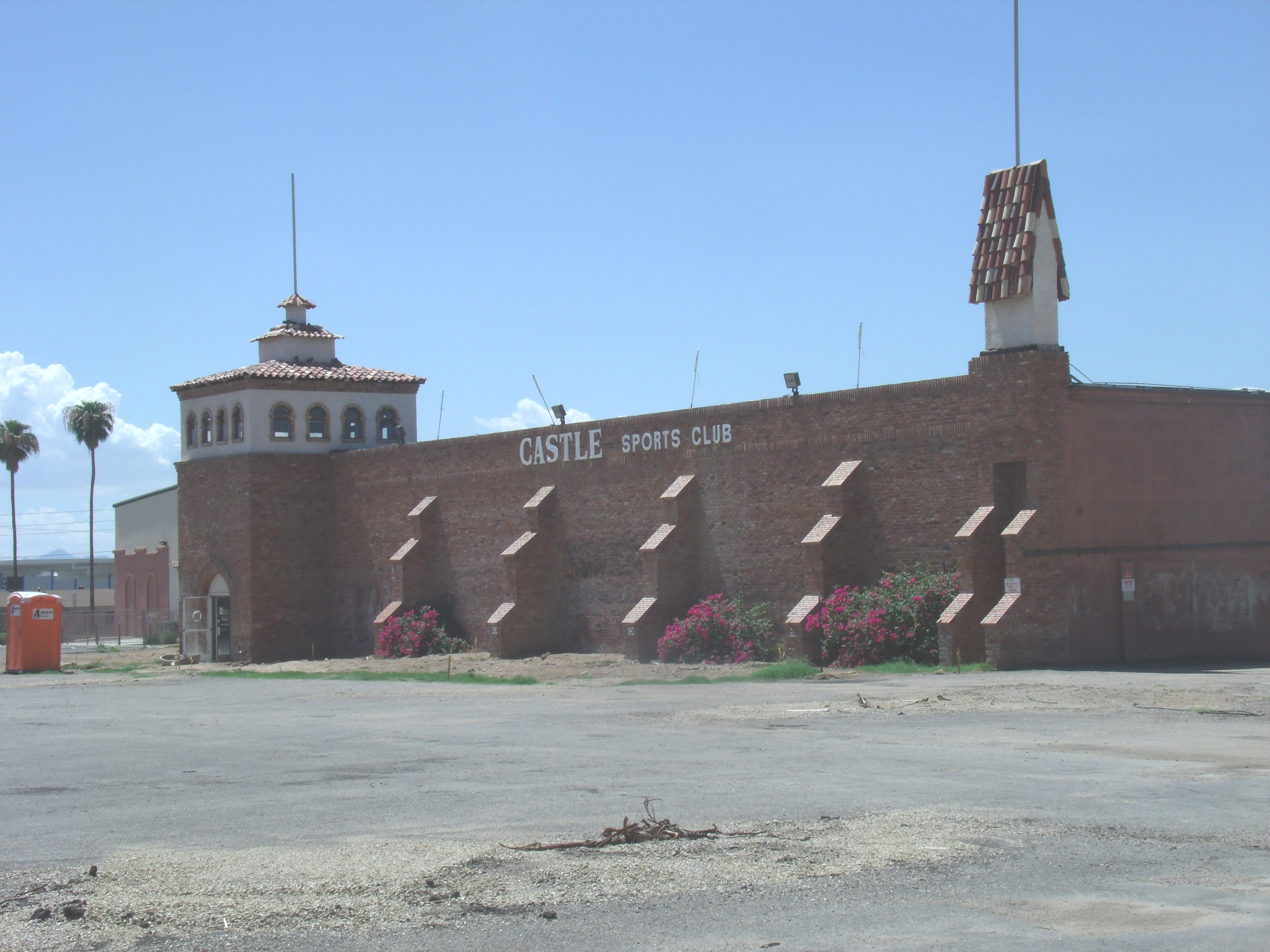
Different view of the castle while it was a sports club

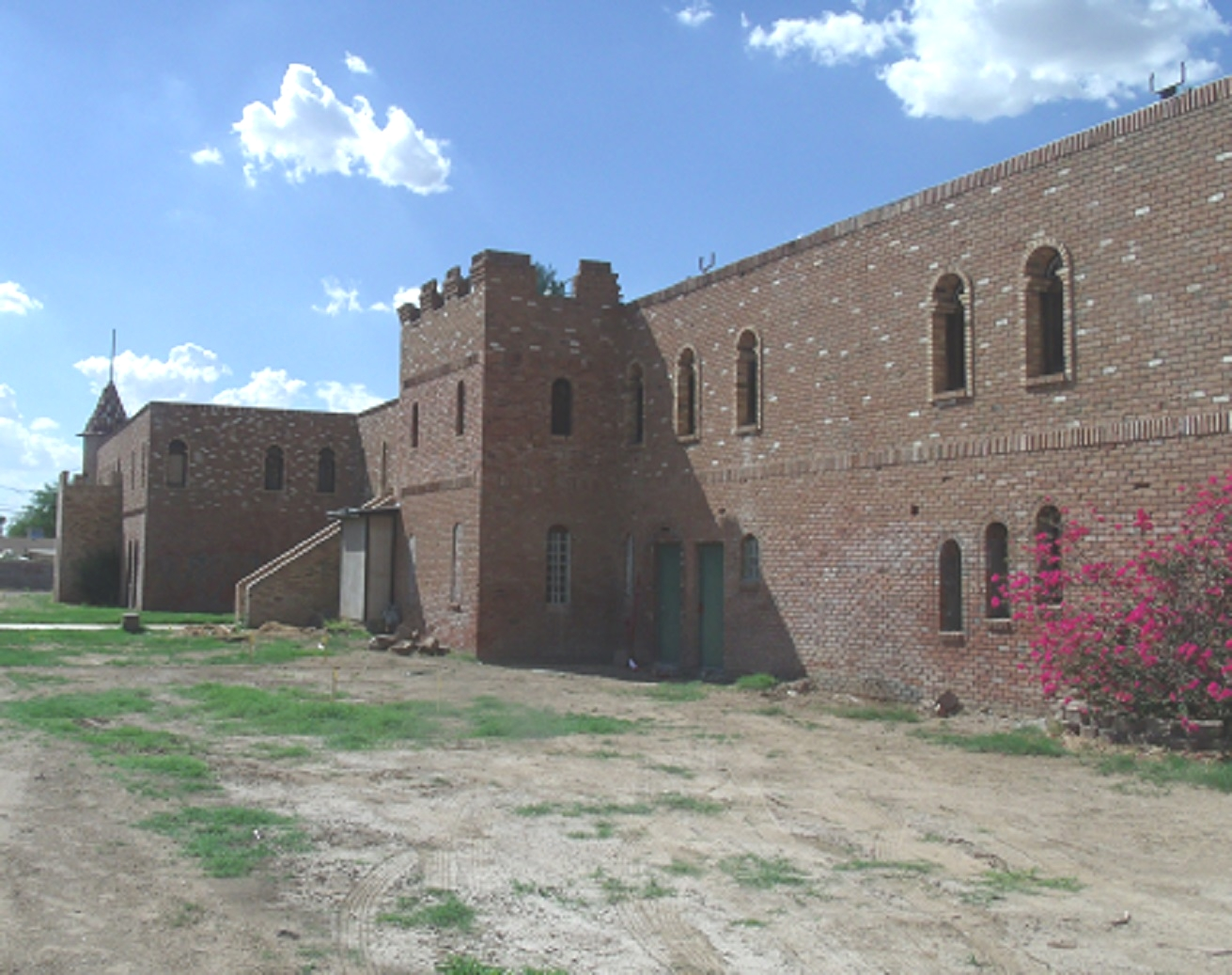
Side view of the castle

== See also ==
- List of historic properties in Phoenix, Arizona
- Sunnyslope, Arizona
- Other uses of the term El Cid

Other historic structures in Phoenix

- Smurthwaite House
- Windsor Hotel
- Squaw Peak Inn
- Tovrea Castle
- Mystery Castle
