= Edward A. Tovrea =

American businessman (1861–1932)

Edward Ambrose Tovrea (March 20, 1861 – February 7, 1932) was an American entrepreneur who is best known as a prominent Arizona cattle baron.

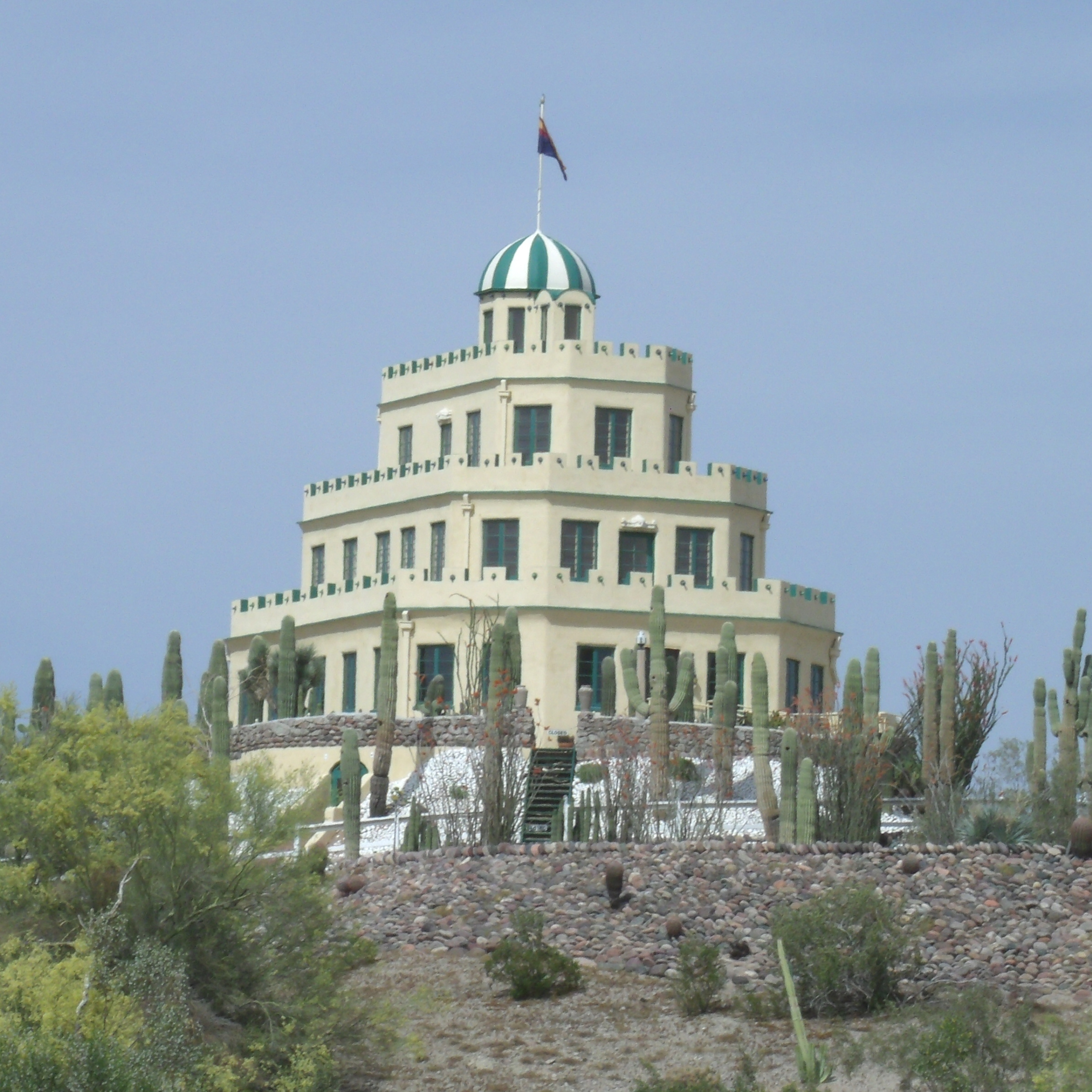
Tovrea Castle

Edward Tovrea was born at Sparta in Randolph County, Illinois. He was the owner of Tovrea Stockyards in Phoenix. Tovrea opened his stockyard operation in 1919. In 1931 he purchased the Tovrea Castle, one of the most famous landmarks in the City of Phoenix.

He and his first wife Lillian had five sons. In 1906, Edward divorced Lillian and married Della Gillespie. Tovrea died in 1932 and was buried in Greenwood/Memory Lawn Mortuary & Cemetery.
