= Economy of Phoenix =

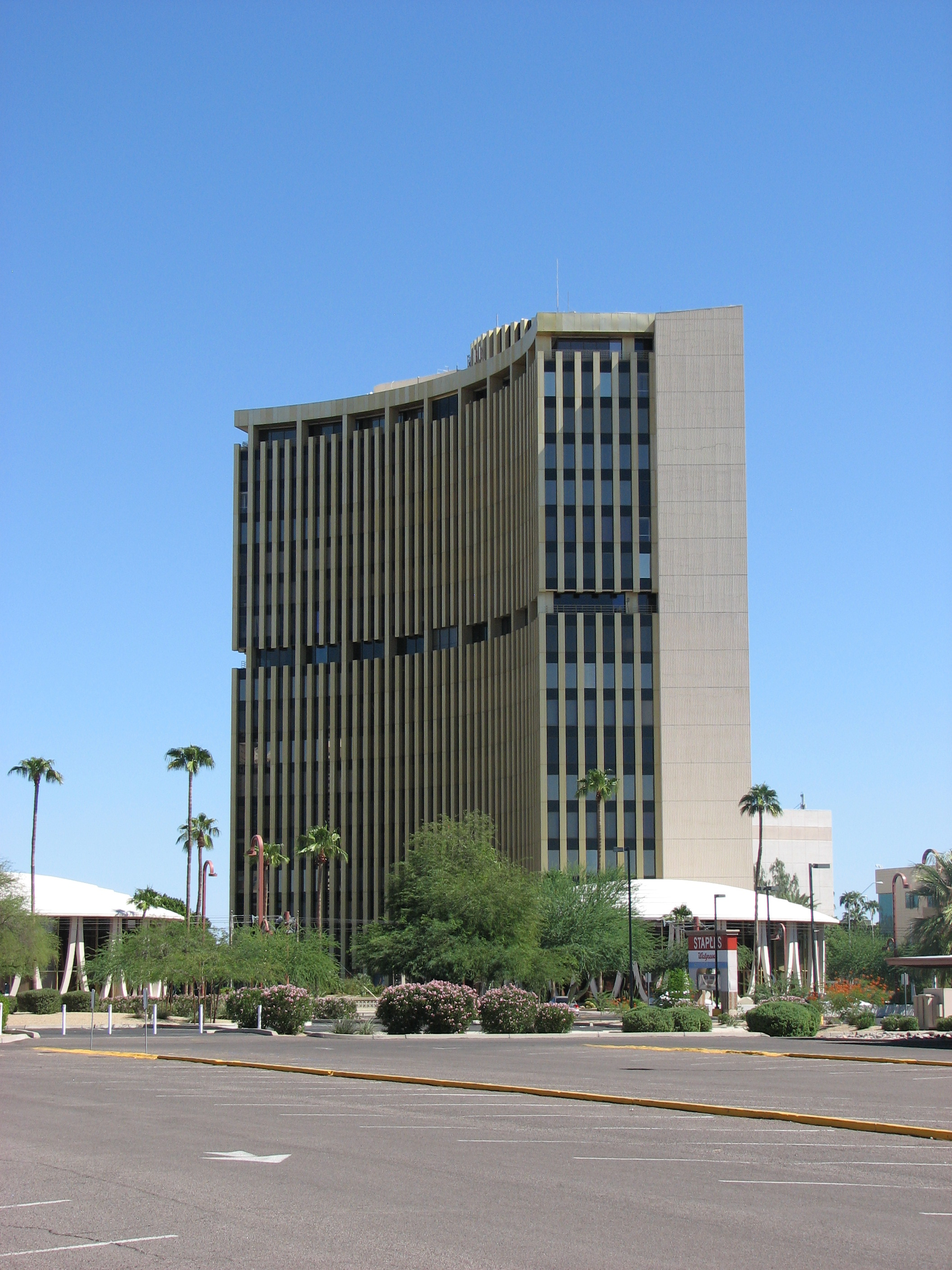
Phoenix Financial Center

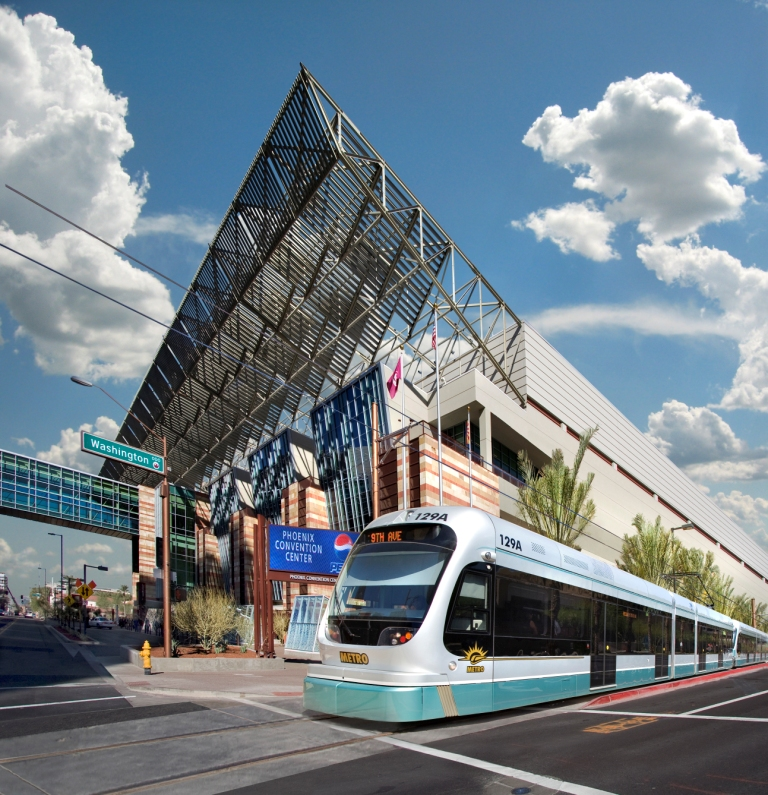
Phoenix Convention Center, light rail in front - 2009

The economy of Phoenix was focused during the early years of Phoenix primarily on agriculture and natural resources, dependent mainly on the "5Cs", which were copper, cattle, climate, cotton, and citrus. Since World War II, the Phoenix economy has become diversified.

== 1800s – 1910s ==
The early economy of Phoenix was focused primarily on agriculture and natural resources, dependent mainly on the "5Cs", which were copper, cattle, climate, cotton, and citrus. Once the Salt River Project was completed, the city, and the valley in general, began to develop more rapidly, due to a now fairly reliable source of water. Led by agriculture, the number one crop in the 1910s was alfalfa, followed by citrus, cotton, and other crops, with almost a quarter-million acres under cultivation by the middle of the decade. World War I would greatly change the agricultural landscape of the valley, and teach the farmers of the region an invaluable, if difficult lesson.

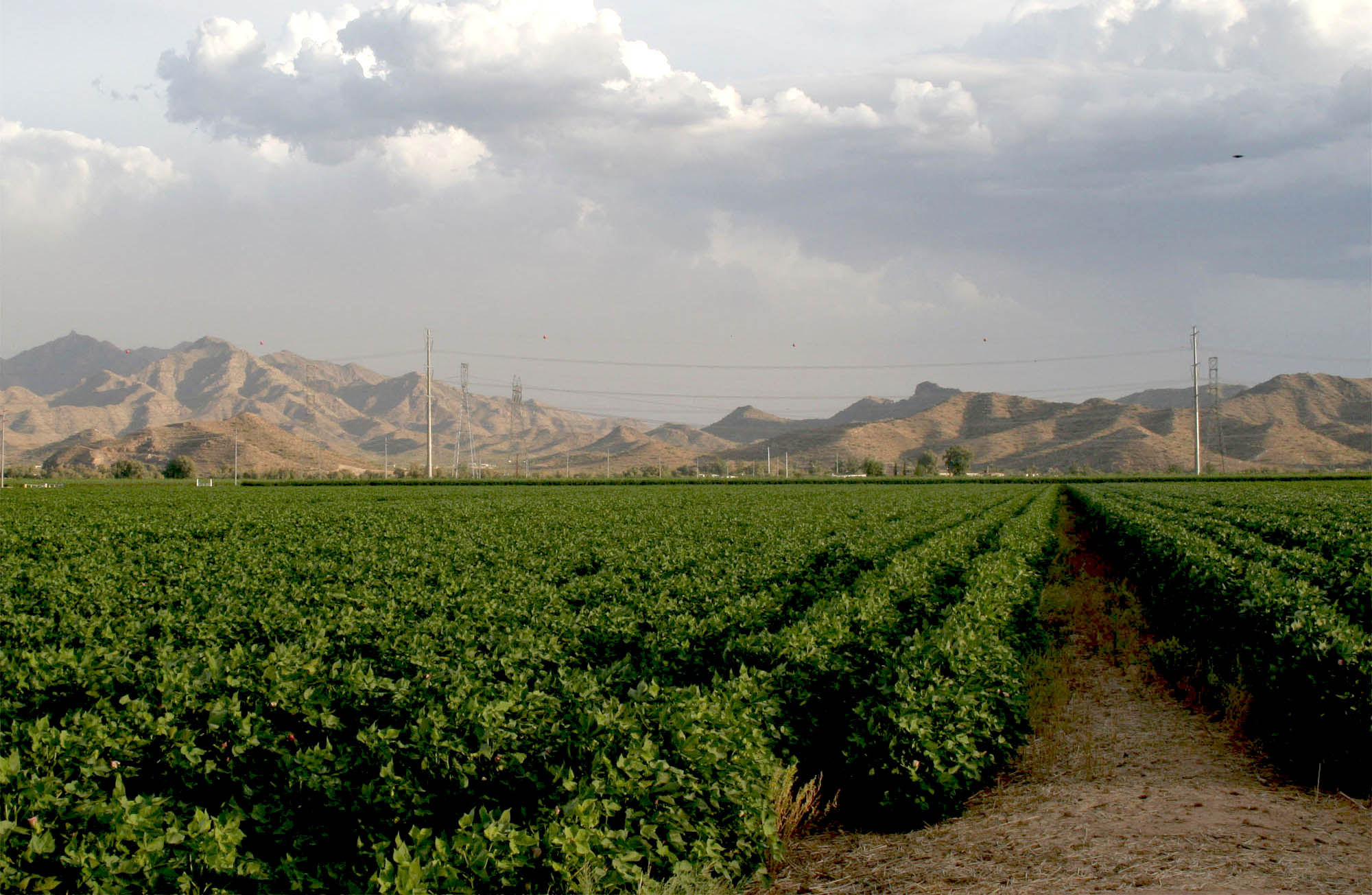
A cotton field outside Phoenix.

As the war began, imports of foreign cotton were no longer available to American manufacturing, since cotton was a major material used in the production of tires and airplane fabric, those manufacturers began to look for new sources. The Salt River Valley looked to be an ideal location for expansion of the cotton crop. Led by Goodyear, tire and airplane manufacturers began to buy more and more cotton from valley growers. In fact, the town of Goodyear was founded during this period when the company purchased desert acreage southwest of Phoenix to grow cotton. By 1918, cotton had replaced alfalfa as the number one industry in Phoenix. As the price of cotton rose, more and more of Phoenix acreage was devoted to the crop. However, in 1920, when cotton accounted for three-quarters of the cultivated acreage in the valley, the bottom fell out of the cotton market due to the dual reasons of lower demand due to the end of the war production machine and foreign growers now once again having access to the American market, resulting in their shipping large amounts of cotton to the U.S. This led to a diversification of crops in the valley from that point forward.

== 1920s – WWII ==
Cattle and the meat industry was also a vital part of the economy. The cotton bust led to more production of alfalfa, wheat, and barley, as well as citrus. The grain production in turn led to an increase in the cattle ranching industry. By the end of the Roaring Twenties, Phoenix boasted the largest meat processing plant between Dallas and Los Angeles. While that plant and its attendant stockyards are long gone, a remnant remains in the famous Stockyards Restaurant. The prosperity following the local depression caused by the cotton bust enabled other industries to grow as well. The city's first skyscraper, the seven-story Heard Building, was built in 1920. This was followed by the 10-story Luhrs Building after the bust in 1924, and then by the Westward Ho, a 16-story hotel constructed in 1928.

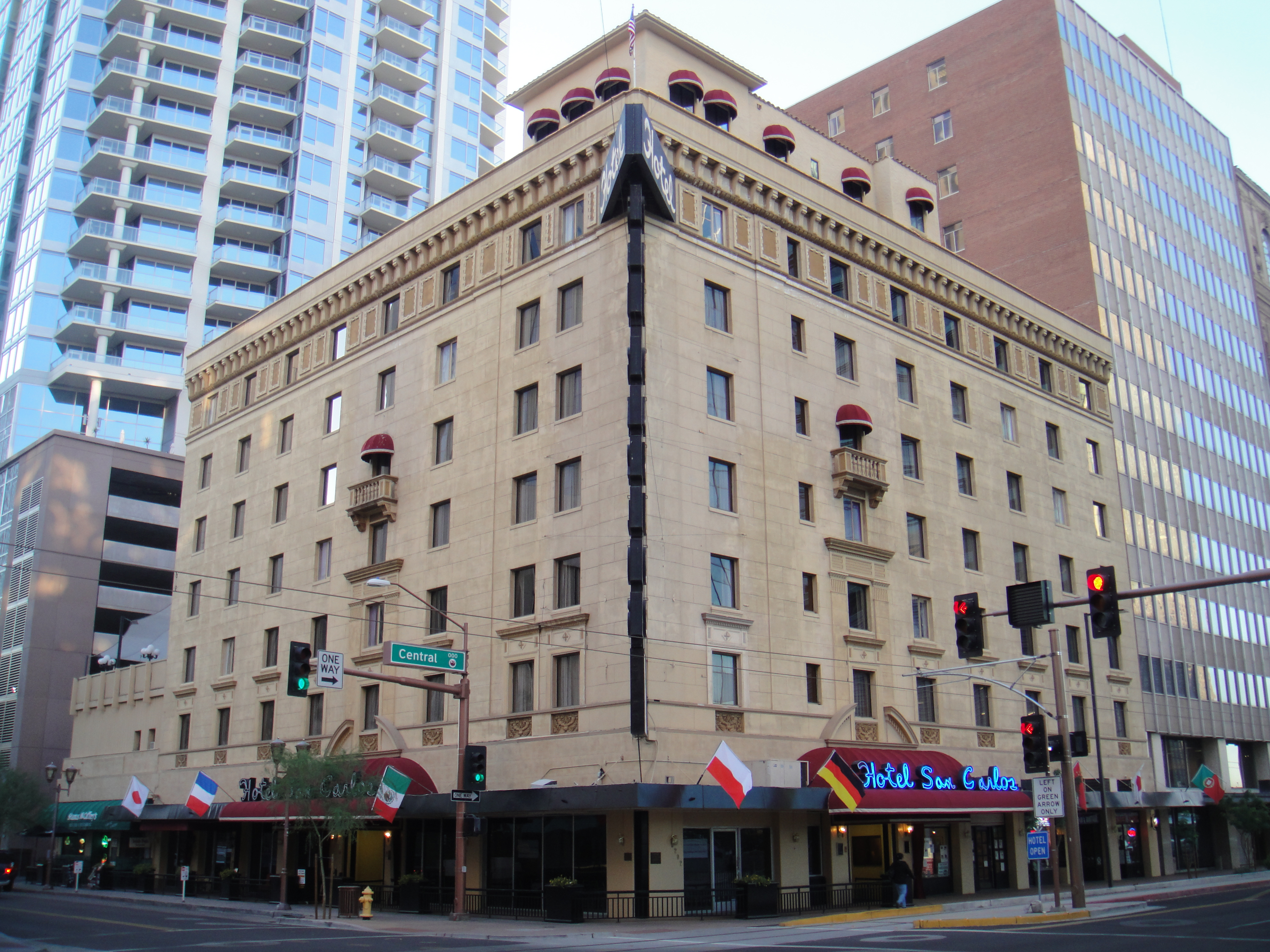
Hotel San Carlos opened in 1928

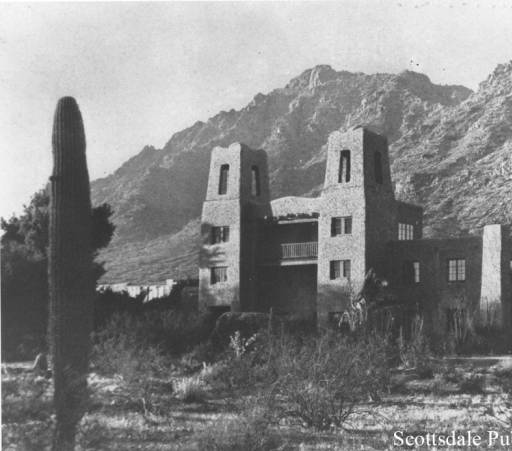
Jokake Inn, 1926

With the establishment of a main rail line (the Southern Pacific) in 1926, the opening of the Union Station in 1923, and the creation of Sky Harbor airport by the end of the decade, the city became more easily accessible. The construction of the Westward Ho was part of a concerted effort on the part of both civic and business organizations in the city to develop it as a tourist destination. Phoenix already had two highly rated resorts, the Ingleside Inn and the Jokake Inn, and after the Westward Ho, the Arizona Biltmore, designed by one of Frank Lloyd Wright's students, was constructed in 1929. Other major hotels were built during this era, such as the San Carlos (also in 1928), which led older hotels, like the Hotel Adams, to refurbish themselves in order to remain competitive. By the end of the decade, the tourism industry topped $10 million for the first time in the city's history. Tourism remains one of the top ten economic drivers of the city to this day.

The Great Depression affected Phoenix, but the effects were not as deep or long-lasting as they were in much of the rest of the country. Phoenix had a very diverse economy, and was not heavily vested in the manufacturing sector. While the stock market crash did not affect the city very much directly, the suppression of the national economy did. Revenue from all major industries in the valley decreased drastically: copper mining dropped from $155 million in 1929 to $15 million by 1932; agriculture and livestock also saw reductions during that same period, although not as drastic, from $42 million to $14 million and $25.5 million to $15 million, respectively. Compared to the rest of the country, and even the rest of the state, Phoenix was not as badly affected by bankruptcies, foreclosures, or unemployment, and by 1934 the recovery was underway.

== 1940s – 1990s ==
At the conclusion of World War II, the valley's economy began to further grow and expand. After the war, the city's population began to surge, as many men who had undergone their military training at the various bases in and around Phoenix returned with their families. In 1948, Motorola chose Phoenix for the site of its new research and development center for military electronics. They were followed in time by other high-tech companies, such as Intel and McDonnell Douglas.

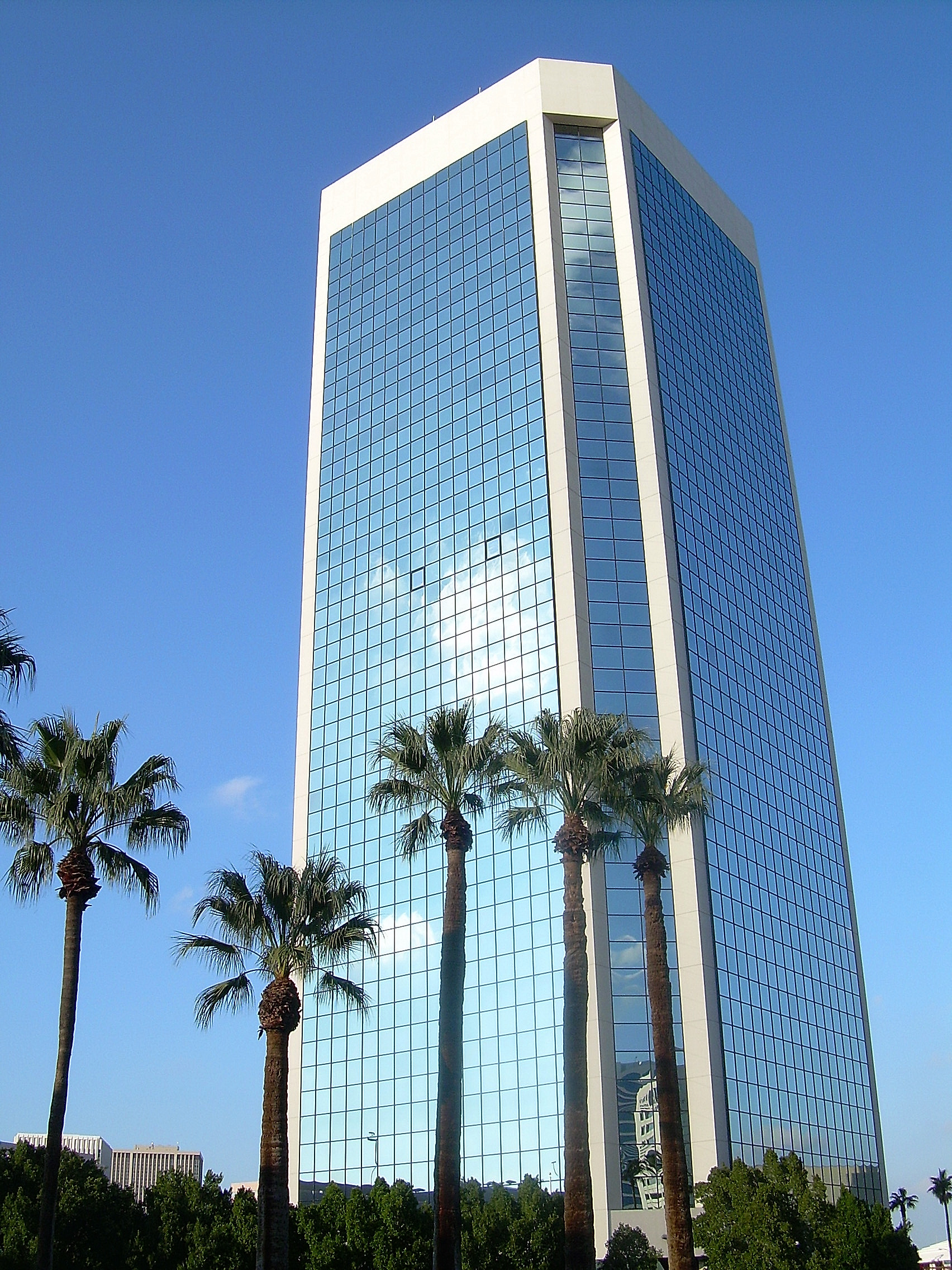
Office building at 3300 N. Central Avenue – downtown Phoenix

The construction industry, spurred on by the city's growth, further expanded with the development of Sun City. Much like Levittown, New York became the template for suburban development in post-World War II America, Sun City, just northwest of Phoenix, became the template for retirement communities when Del E. Webb opened the community in 1960. Over 100,000 people visited the community during the opening weekend.

== Present ==
Due to the Great Recession, construction in Phoenix collapsed in 2008, and housing prices plunged. Historically, Arizona trailed the rest of the country into recession, but Phoenix entered this last recession before the rest of the country due to the prominence of the construction industry in its economy.

According to the Bureau of Economic Analysis of the United States Department of Commerce, in 2018, Maricopa County had a Gross Domestic Product (GDP) of just over $220.8 billion, a 4.5% increase over the prior year.

The 10 largest industries were, in descending order: real estate ($31 billion), financial services ($21.3 billion), manufacturing ($16.8 billion), health care ($15.7 billion), retail ($14.9 billion), wholesale ($12.9 billion), professional services ($12.8 billion), construction ($10.4 billion), waste management ($9.1 billion), and tourism ($6.8 billion). Government, if it had been a private industry, would have been ranked third on the list, generating $18.9 billion.

Manufacturing ranks third among Phoenix's industries, and includes the production of computers and other electronic equipment, missiles, aircraft parts, chemicals, and processed foods.

The military has a significant presence in Phoenix, with Luke Air Force Base located in the western suburbs. At its height, in the 1940s, the Phoenix area had three military bases: Luke Field (still in use), Falcon Field, and Williams Air Force Base (now Phoenix-Mesa Gateway Airport), with numerous auxiliary air fields located throughout the region. Foreign governments have established 30 consular offices and eleven active foreign chambers of commerce and trade associations in metropolitan Phoenix.

== Job growth ==
In major job markets, as defined as those markets with greater than 1 million jobs, Greater Phoenix ranked number 1 in employment growth prior to the recession beginning in 2007. Just three years later, it ended its free fall in job growth by hitting the bottom of the list of those 28 major markets, dead last. However, 2013 saw Greater Phoenix rebound to 7th. Arizona's year-over-year job growth (of which Phoenix is the main driver) continued to outpace the nation through August 2013. Arizona's year-over-year job growth was at or above 2.0% each month of that year. In contrast, national job growth was between 1.5% and 1.7% on a year-over-year basis.

In 2013, the Phoenix area saw a 2.7% increase in non-farm employment, from 1.758 million to 1.805 million. Job growth has occurred across the board, with the fastest rate in education and health services, trade, transportation and utilities, professional and business services, financial activities, and leisure and hospitality.

== Employment ==
As of 2024, Phoenix had a per capita income of $61,840 and an unemployment rate of 3.3%; the top employers were:

Rank	Employer	Employees in 2024	Employees in 2015	2024 Share	2015 Share
1	Banner Health	▲46,602	35,406	▼1.90%	1.91%
2	State of Arizona	▼41,531	50,816	▼1.69%	2.74%
3	Amazon.com Inc	▲40,000	-	▲1.63%	-
4	Walmart Inc	▲37,648	32,373	▼1.54%	1.75%
5	Arizona State University	▲37,402	12,676	▲1.53%	0.68%
6	University of Arizona	▲23,439	-	▲0.96%	-
7	Fry's Food Stores	▲21,000	17,286	▼0.86%	0.93%
8	City of Phoenix	▲15,018	14,585	▼0.61%	0.79%
9	HonorHealth	▲14,801	-	▲0.60%	-
10	Wells Fargo & Co	▼13,000	14,480	▼0.53%	0.78%
10	US Portal Service	▲13,000	-	▲0.53%	-

== Companies ==
Phoenix is currently home to four Fortune 500 companies: electronics corporation Avnet, mining company Freeport-McMoRan, retailer PetSmart, and waste hauler Republic Services. Honeywell's Aerospace division is headquartered in Phoenix, and the valley hosts many avionics and mechanical facilities. Intel employs 12,000 people in the area, which includes the second-largest Intel location in the country. American Express hosts their financial transactions, customer information, and their entire website in Phoenix. The city is also home to: the headquarters of U-Haul, a rental and moving supply company; Best Western, the world's largest family of hotels; Apollo Education Group, parent of the University of Phoenix; and utility company Pinnacle West. Choice Hotels has its IT division and operations support center in the North Phoenix area. American Airlines has a strong presence in Phoenix. Mesa Air Group, a regional airline group, is headquartered in Phoenix.
