= Mystery Castle =

Structure in Phoenix, Arizona

Coordinates: 33°21′30″N 112°03′48″W

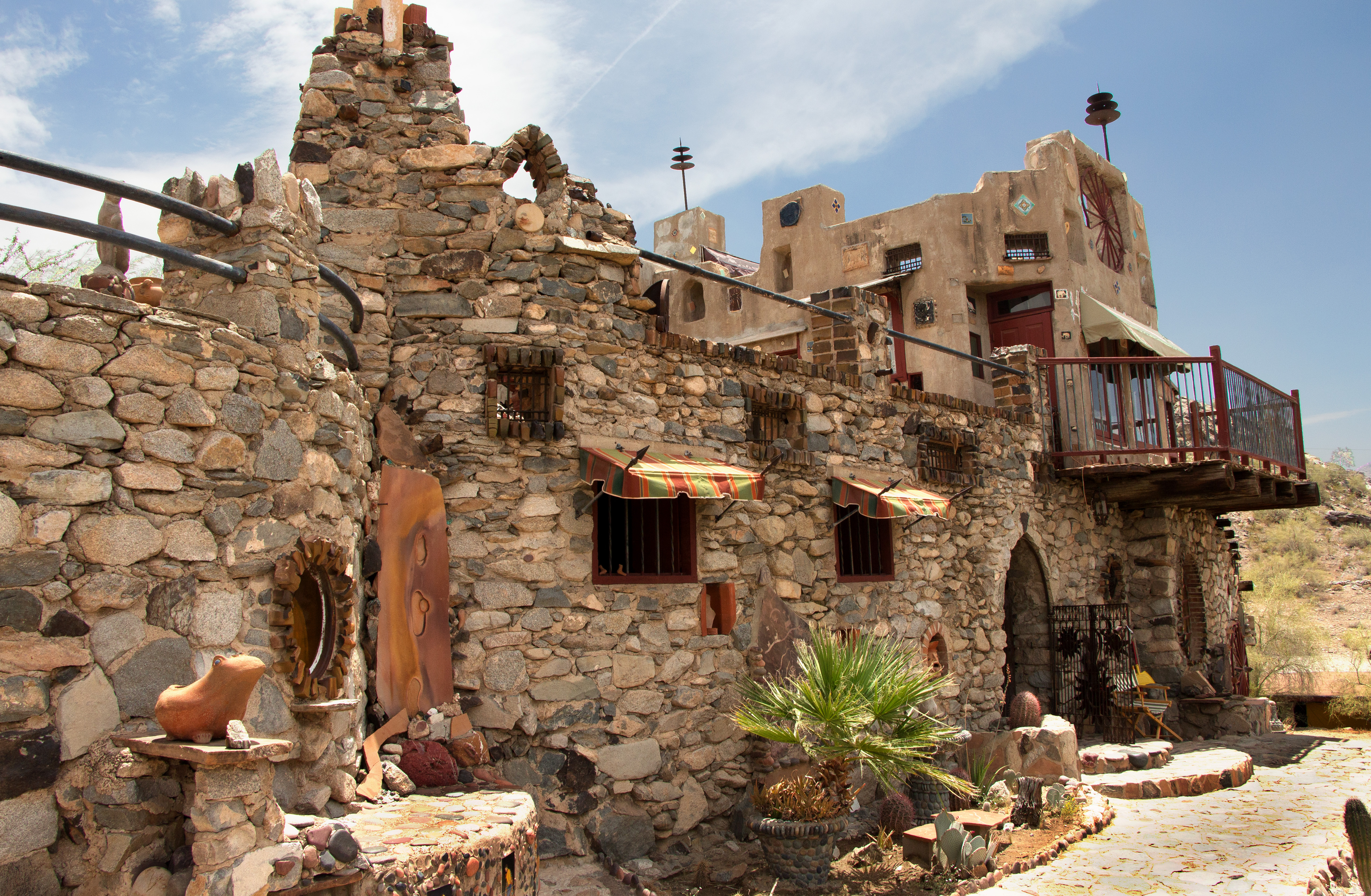
Mystery Castle

Mystery Castle is located in the city of Phoenix, Arizona, in the foothills of South Mountain Park. It was built in the 1930s by Boyce Luther Gulley for his daughter Mary Lou Gulley. After learning he had tuberculosis, Gulley moved from Seattle to the Phoenix area and began building the house from found or inexpensive materials. Boyce Gulley died in 1945, and Mary Lou and her mother were notified by attorney that they had inherited the property. Shortly after, the mother and daughter moved in.

Their story attracted attention, giving the home some renown as well as its exotic name: A Life Magazine story (January 26, 1948) used the headline "Life Visits a Mystery Castle: A Young Girl Rules Over the Strange Secrets of a Fairy Tale Dream House in the Arizona Desert." The photograph featured Mary Lou posing atop the cantilever staircase leading to the roof of the house. That same year, Mary Lou and her mother began offering tours of the home.

== Construction ==
Said to be held together by a combination of mortar, cement, calcium, and goat milk, the sprawling 18-room, three story castle is built from a wide range of materials – stone, adobe, automobile parts, salvaged rail tracks from a mine, telephone poles, etc. It features a chapel, cantina, and a dungeon. Parts of the castle remain unfinished, and electricity and plumbing were not added until 1992. As the housing boom progressed in Phoenix, new development encroached close to the castle and its grounds, making it far less isolated.

Mary Lou Gulley died on November 3, 2010 and the property has since been maintained by the Mystery Castle Foundation, a 501c3 non-profit organization.

The Mystery Castle has been designated as a Phoenix Point of Pride.

Extensively vandalized on March 6, 2022, the Mystery Castle suffered an estimated $100,000 in damage. No arrests have been made. The Castle was temporarily closed for tours, but reopened on March 18, 2022. Tours have since been suspended.

== Gallery ==
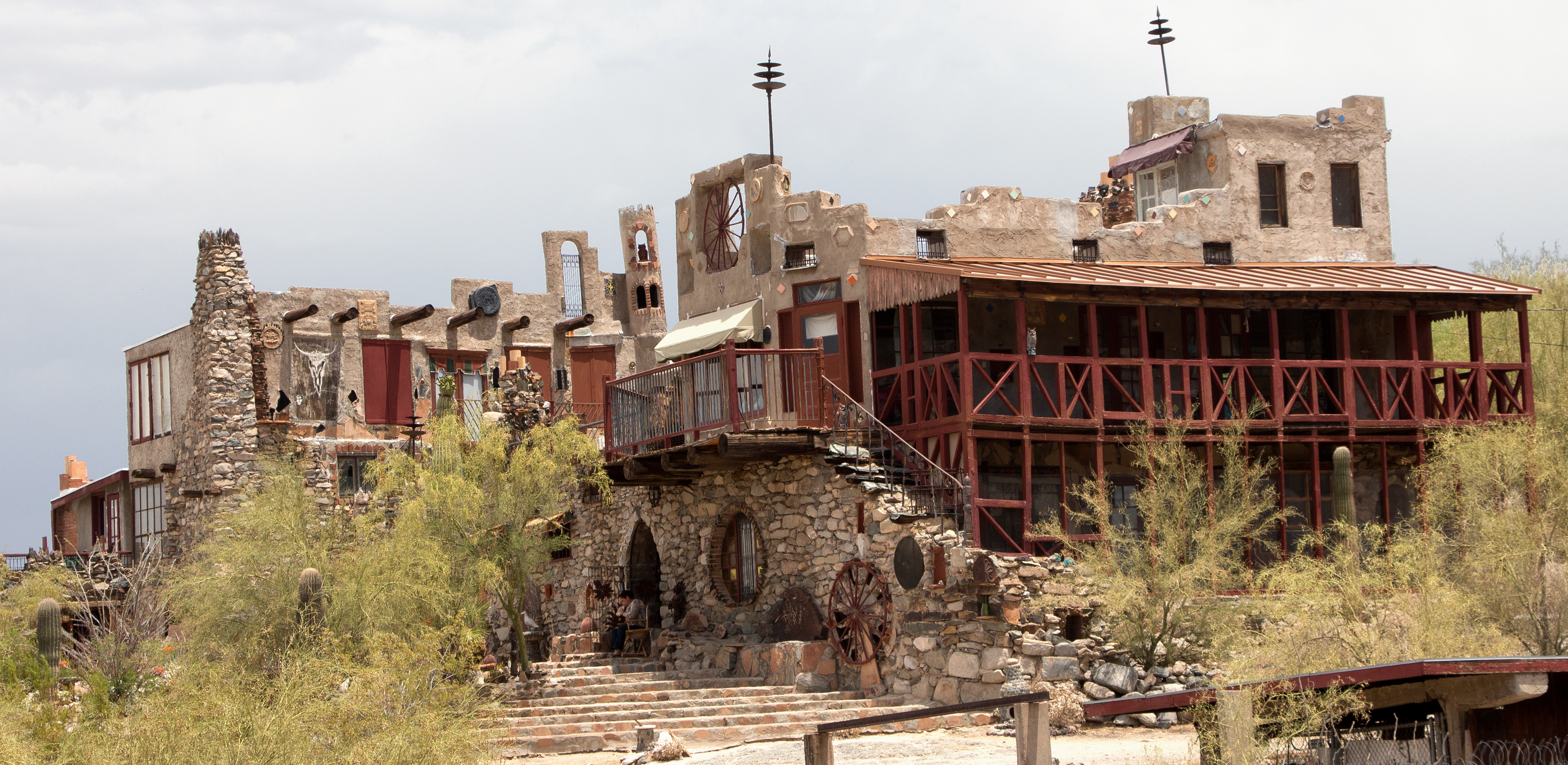
Overview of the castle

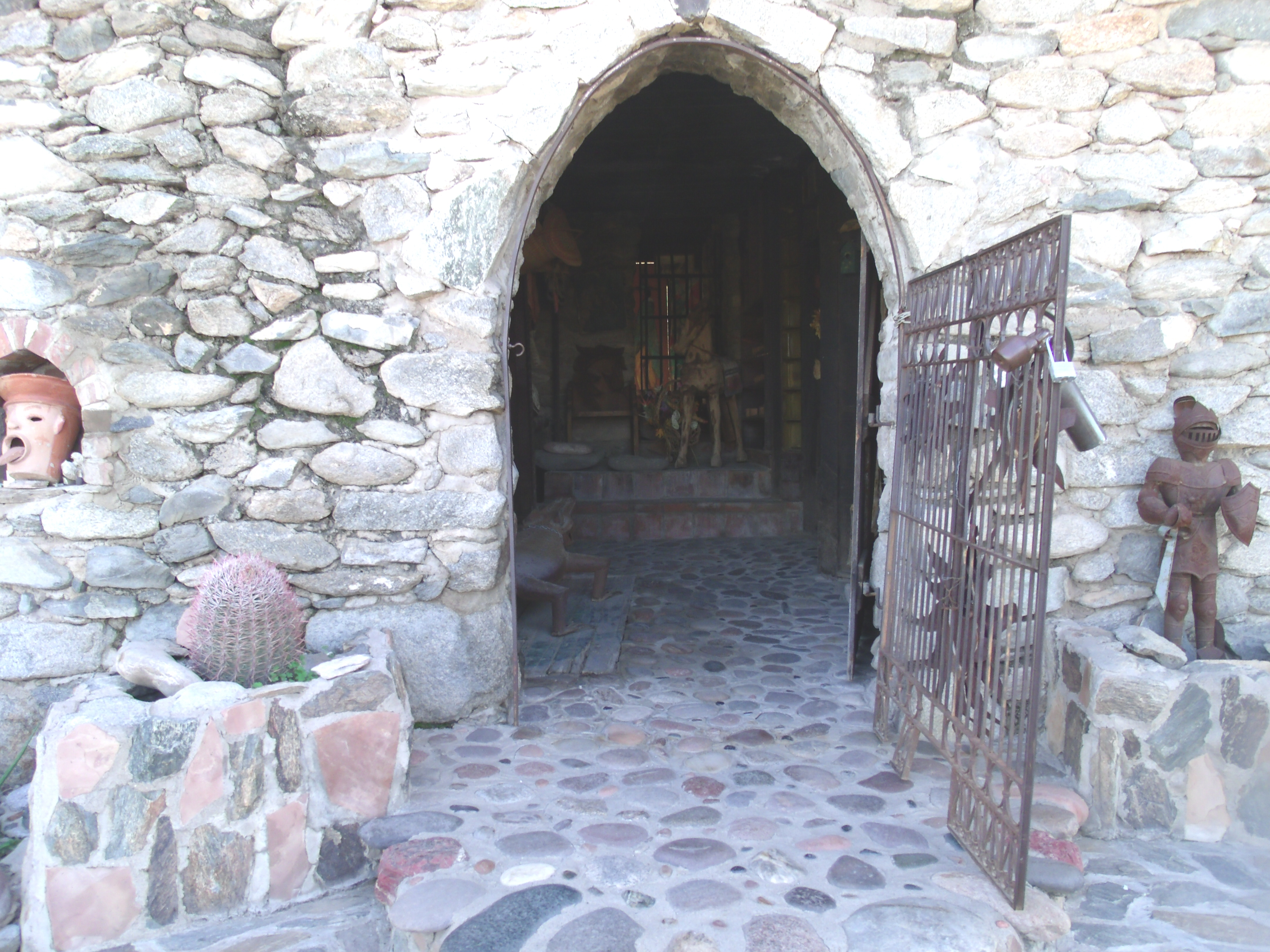
Main entrance

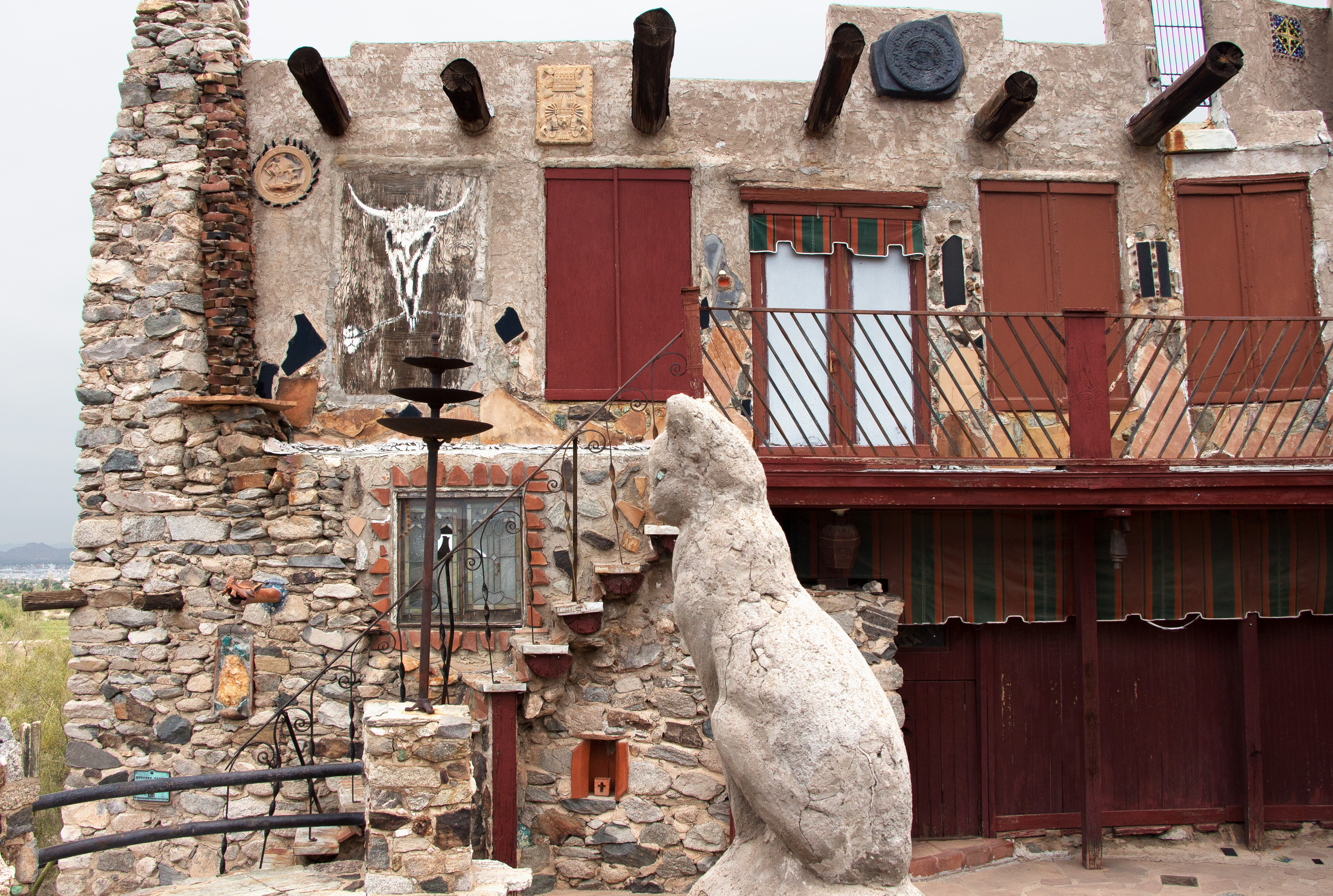
Patio

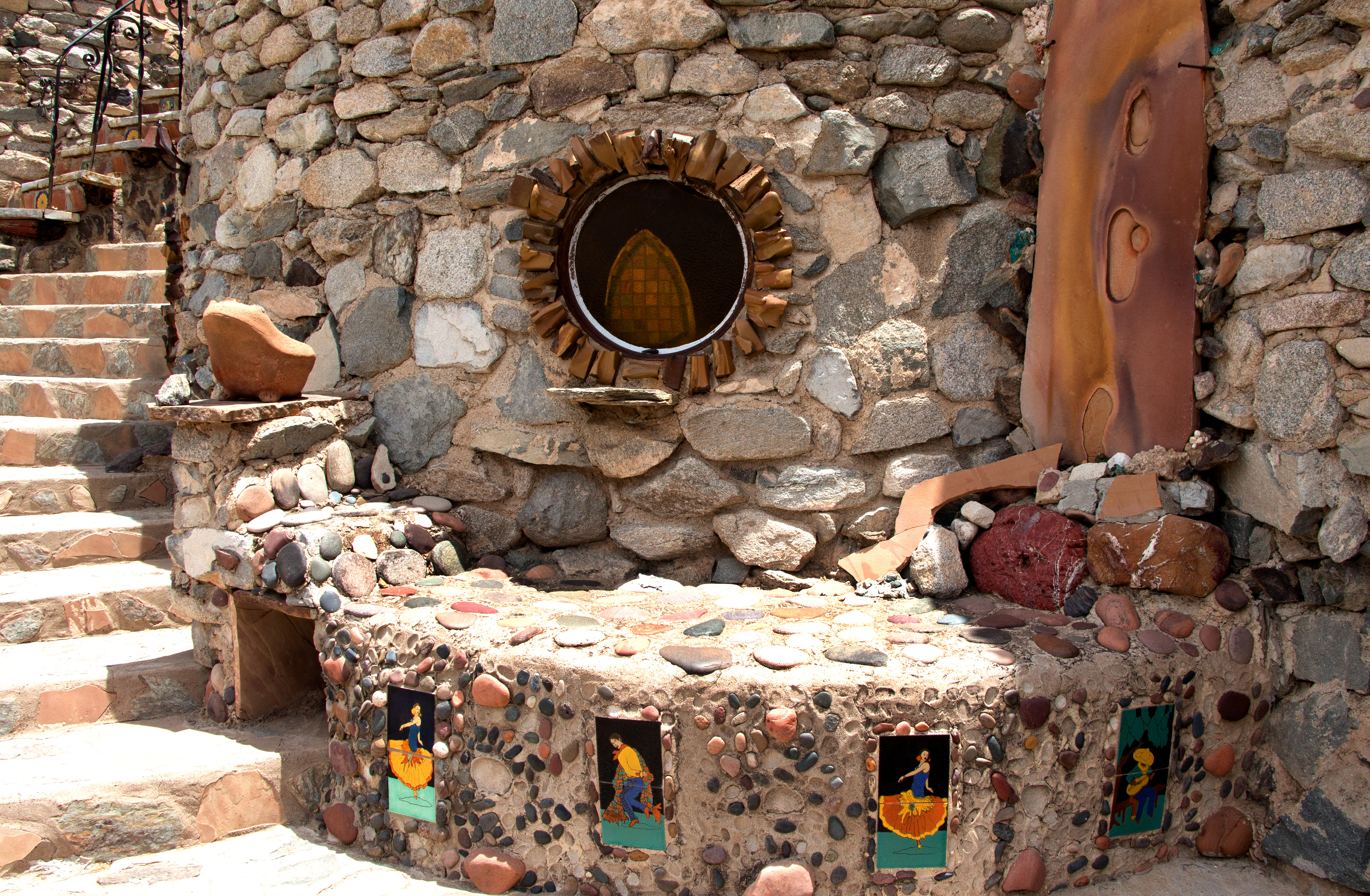
Exterior wall detail

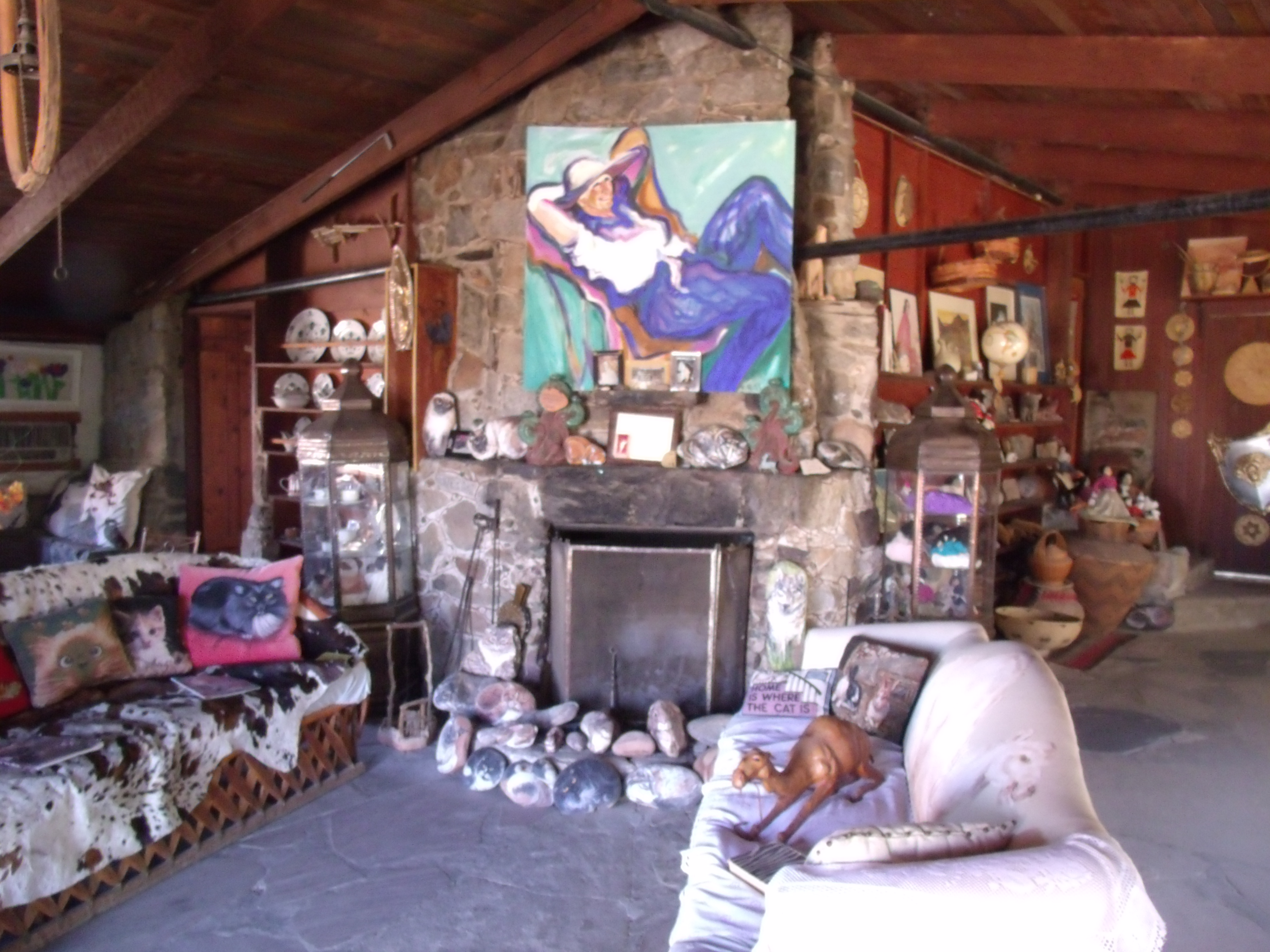
One of eighteen rooms in the castle

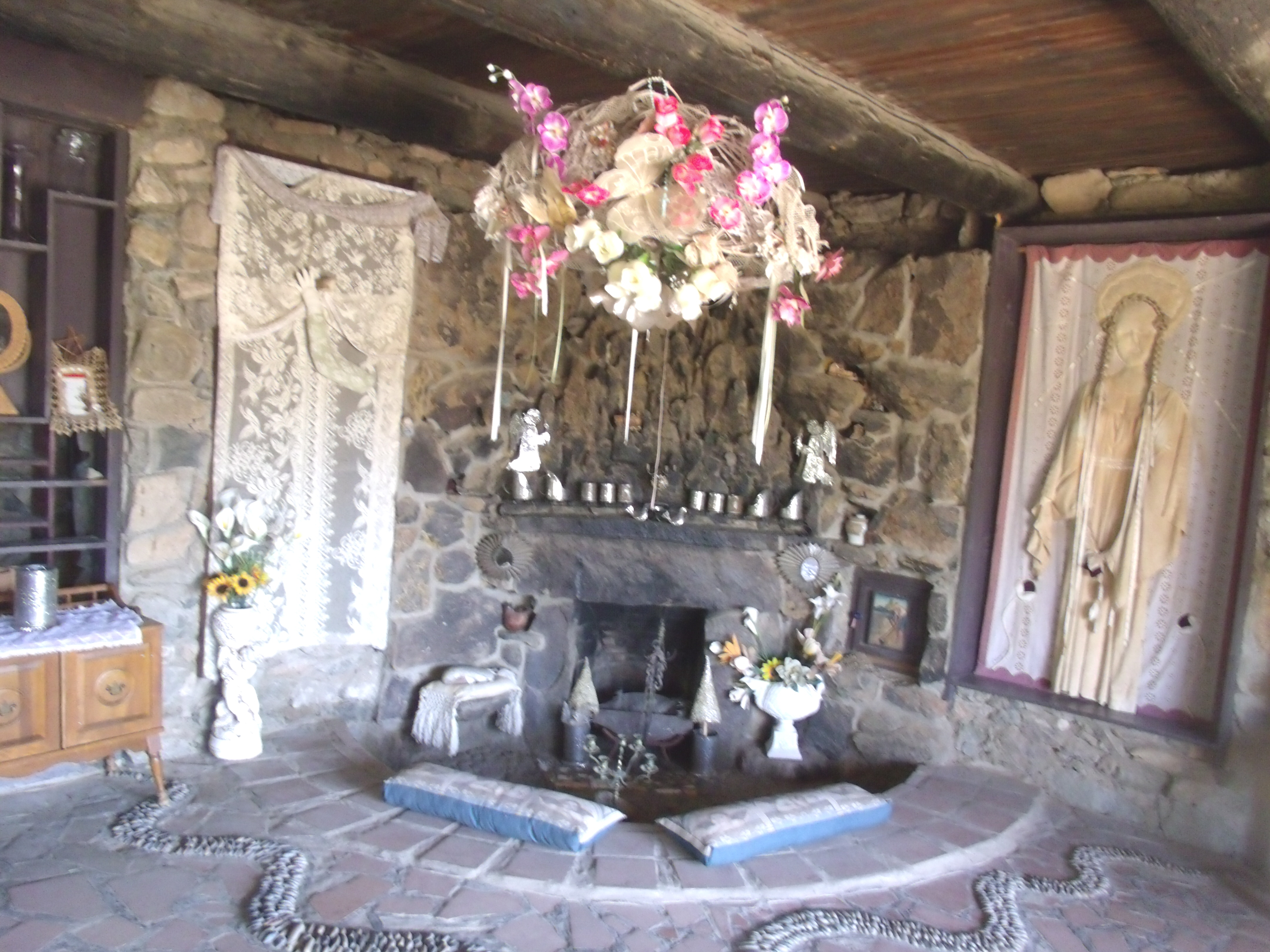
Another room in the castle

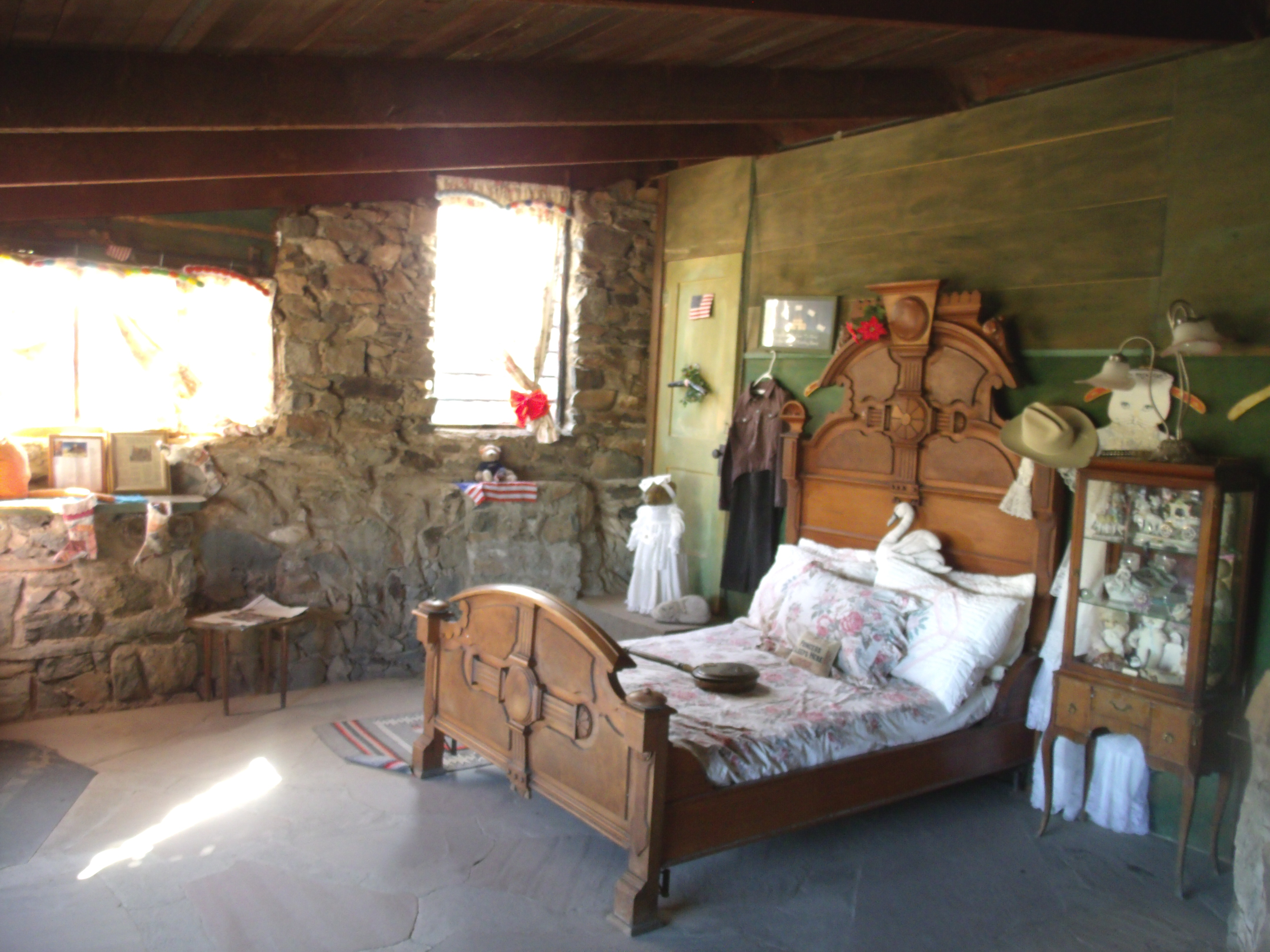
Mary Lou Gulley's bedroom

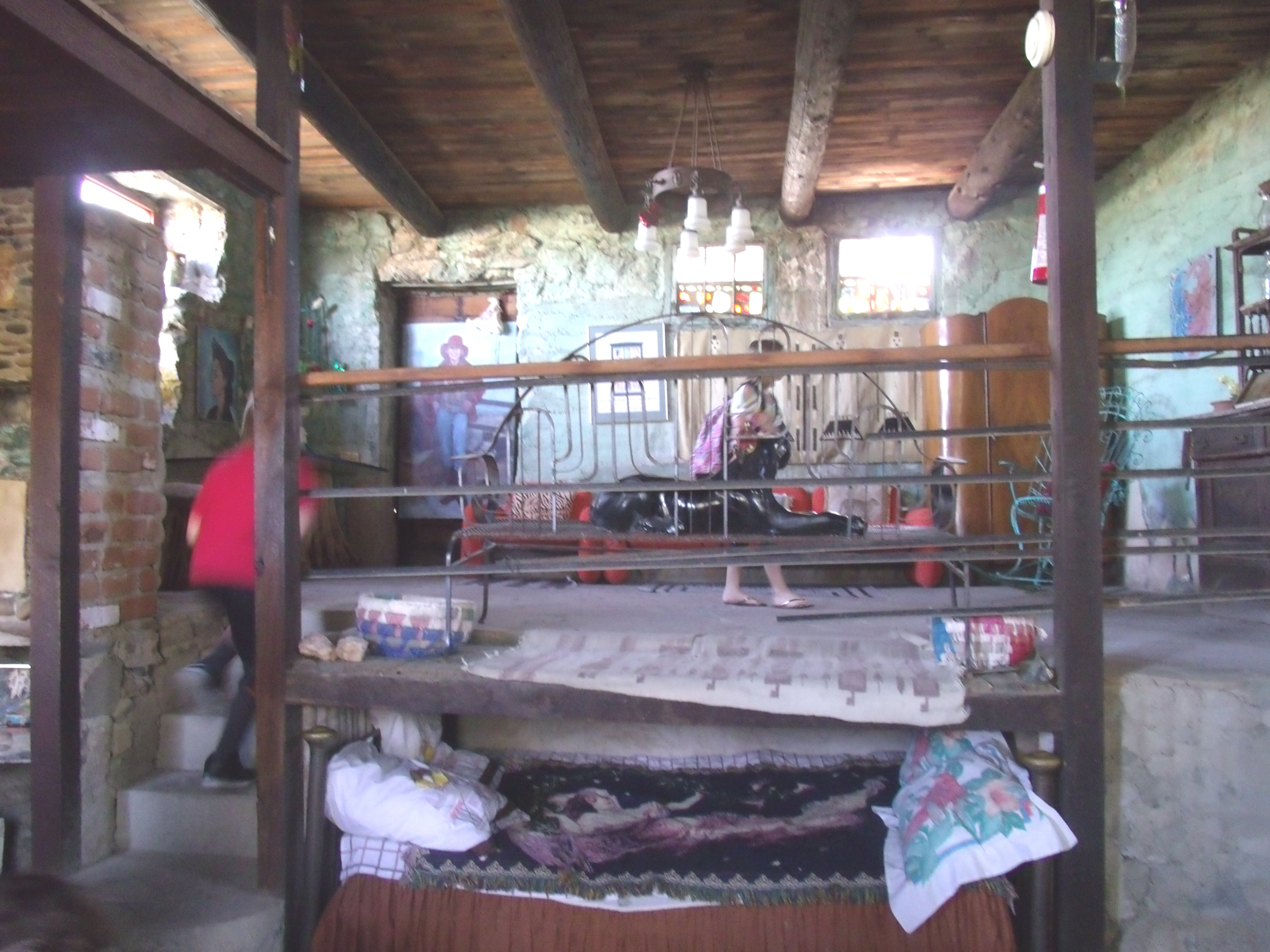
Another bedroom in the castle

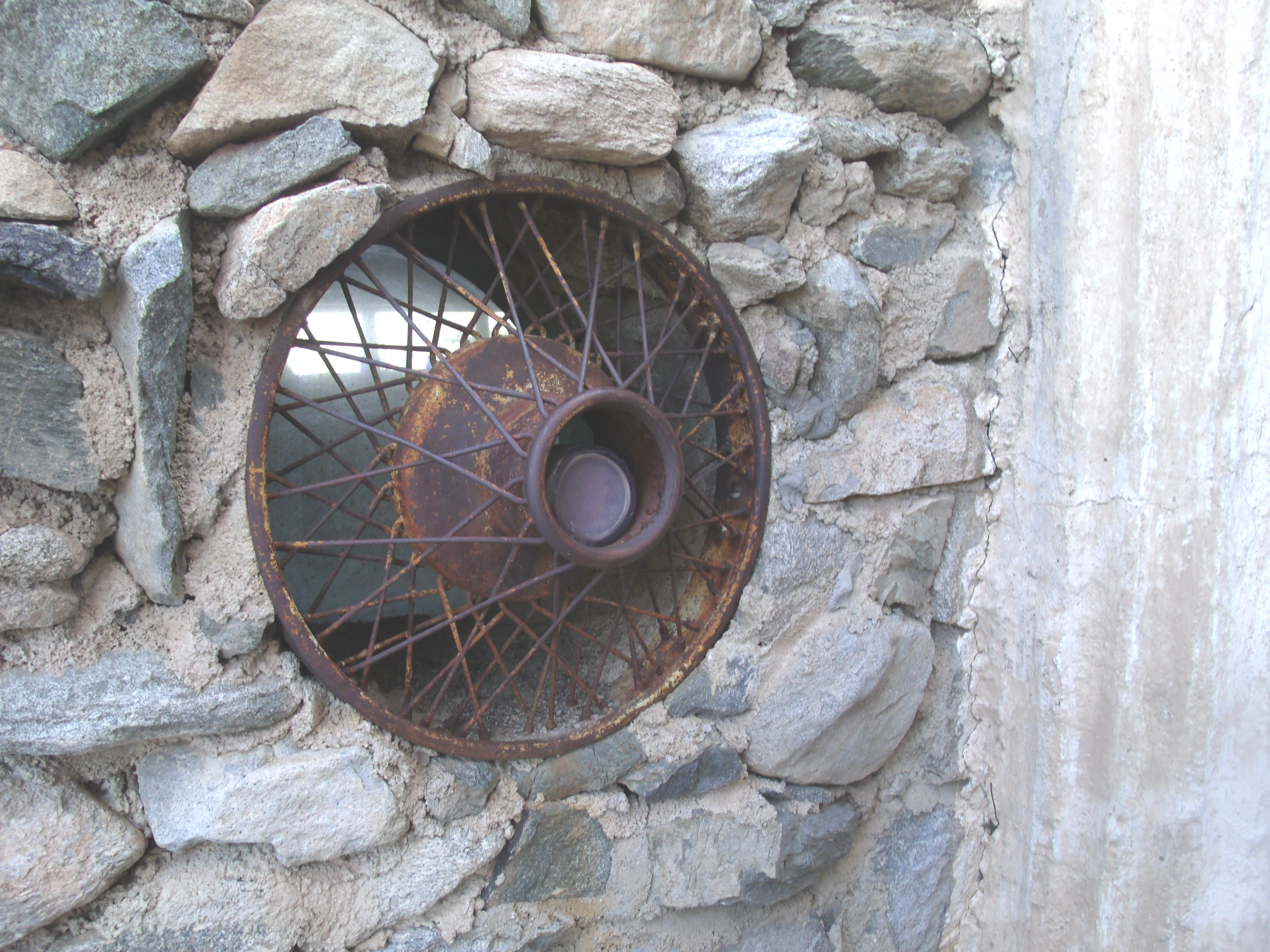
A window which Gulley made with the spoke rim of an old car

== See also ==
- List of historic properties in Phoenix, Arizona
- Phoenix Historic Property Register
- Tovrea Castle
- El Cid Castle
- Bishop Castle, a one-man construction project near Rye, Colorado.
- Coral Castle, a one-man structure created by Latvian-American eccentric Edward Leedskalnin located in Florida,
