= Criminal Investigation Division =

Criminal investigation division may refer to:

- FBI Criminal Investigative Division
- IRS Criminal Investigation Division
- United States Army Criminal Investigation Division
- United States Marine Corps Criminal Investigation Division
- Texas Department of Public Safety Criminal Investigations Division

== See also ==
- CID (disambiguation)
- Criminal Investigation Department (disambiguation)
