= Criminal Investigation Department (disambiguation) =

A criminal investigation department or crime investigation department is a branch of many police forces. It may refer to:

- Criminal Investigation Department, overview article
- Criminal Investigation Department (Bangladesh)
- Criminal Investigation Department (India)
  - CID West Bengal
- Criminal Investigation Department (Ireland)
- Criminal Investigation Department (Singapore)
- Criminal Investigation Department (Sri Lanka)
- Criminal Investigation Department (Kenya)

== See also ==
- Criminal Investigation Division (disambiguation)
- CID (disambiguation)
- National Bureau of Investigation (disambiguation)
- Cambala Investigation Agency, Indian television show
