= University of Colombo, Centre for Instrument Development =

Centre for Instrument Development (aka CID) is a multidisciplinary research group / centre that is part of the department of physics, University of Colombo, Sri Lanka. It offers technical courses in certificate, diploma, undergraduate and postgraduate levels.

== History ==
CID is founded by Professor T R Ariyaratne in 2000, with the financial support from the International Science Programs, Uppsala University, Sweden, and Prof. D U J Sonnadara, Dr. M K Jayananda, Dr. R Lelwala were the first members of the CID while Prof. T R Ariyaratne becomes the first and current director of the CID. The first major activity of the CID, "Microcontroller Training Course [MTC]" was initiated by Dr. R Lelwala [coordinater], Mr. Prasan Hettiarachchi and Mr. Navinda Kottege in 2004. Later, the course was renamed as "Training Course in Microcontroller Programming and its applications", and still uses the code name MTC followed by the year. The first research activity of the CID was started by Prof. Sonnadara and Dr. M K Jayananda with Mr. Wasantha [the first M.Phil. degree holder from the CID], on reconfigurable computing. In 2004, Mr. D I Amarasinghe [the second M.Phil. degree holder] started research work on Computational Physics with Prof. D U J Sonnadara, while Mr. Prasan Hettiarachchi and Mr. Nishshanka Jayawantha started research project on grain drying under low humid environment. In 2005, CID was moved to the second floor of the Physics Department Building [the current location]. Mr. Asanga Indunil, Mr. Nishantha Randunu and Mr. Hiran H E Jayaweera are holding the honor of being the first Research Assistants appointed under the CID in 2005 and they organized a national workshop called "Workshop on Emerging Technologies and Sri Lankan Perspectives" in 2005. It was extremely successful workshop and many scientist and researchers were contributed in the workshop. The guest invitees of the workshop were Professor Sune Svanberg and Professor Katerina Svanberg from the Lund University, Sweden.

== Research ==
Major Research Areas
Postharvest technology
Electronic Instrumentation
Drying
Optical spectroscopy
Computational physics
Reconfigurable computing

== Courses offered ==
- M.Sc. in Applied Electronics
- Embedded System Laboratory
- Microcontrollers and Embedded Systems
- Certificate Course on Applied Electronics and Automation Technology
- Training Course on Microcontroller Programming and its Applications
- Workshop on Computer aided PCB designing
- Workshop on Electronic Design Automation
- Workshop on Scientific Writing Disciplines
- Workshop on using LMS

== Personnel ==
Person	Responsibility	Year(s) of contribution
Prof. T R Ariyaratne	Founder, the first and the current director	2000 to the date
Prof. D U J Sonnadara	Senior Member, Coordinator - MSc in Applied Electronics-Batch 2,4	2000 to the date
Dr. M K Jayananda	Senior Member, Coordinator - MSc in Applied Electronics- batch 1	2000 to the date
Dr. R Lelwala	Senior Member, Coordinator - Training course on microcontroller programming and its applications	2000 to the date
Mr. Prasan Hettiarachchi	Research Associate	2004 to the date
Mr. Nishshanka Jayawantha	Research Associate	2004 to 2005
Mr. D I Amarasinghe	Research Associate	2004 to 2005
Mr. Asanga Indunil	Research Assistant	2005 to 2007
Mr. Nishantha Randunu	Research Assistant	2005 to 2007
Mr. Hiran H E Jayaweera	Research Assistant, coordinator - certificate course in applied electronics and automation, coordinator - workshop on computer aided PCB designing, coordinator- workshop on electronic design automation, coordinator-embedded system laboratory	2005 to the date
Mr. C L Ranatunga	Research Associate	2005 to the date
Mr. Udara Abeysekara	Research Assistant	2007 to 2008
Ms. W M S E Fernando	Research Assistant	2007 to 2008
Ms. A K Shyamali	Research Assistant	2007 to the date
Mr. Kuravi Hewawasam	Research Assistant	2007 to 2009
Mr. Kusal Suraweera	Research Assistant	2008 to the date
Mr. O K Ranasinghe	Research Assistant	2008 to 2009
Ms. T Wannige	Research Assistant	2008 to the date

== Products ==
CID-SRM 1.0
