= Hilda Cid =

Chilean crystallographer (born 1933)

Hilda Cid Araneda
- Born: 20 February 1933 (age 93); Talcahuano, Chile
- Education: University of Concepción, Chile, Massachusetts Institute of Technology, United States
- Known for: Chilean scientist who excelled in the field of crystallography

Hilda Cid Araneda (born 20 February 1933) is a Chilean scientist who excelled in the field of crystallography. She was the first Chilean female to complete a PhD in Exact Sciences. She made remarkable contributions both as a professor of mathematics and physics and as influential researcher on structural biology, specially in protein crystallography.

== Life and career ==
Hilda Cid Araneda was born on 20 February 1933 in the port city of Talcahuano (Chile), where she completed her primary and secondary studies. She was the daughter of two school teachers, well aware of the importance of the education of their children.

In 1951, Hilda enrolled in the Teacher's career in physics and mathematics at the University of Concepción and in 1955 won the university prize awarded to the best undergraduate student. She moved then to the Pedagogical Institute of the University of Chile in Santiago (Chile), where she joined the laboratory of crystallography and did some research in physics while she was an assistant professor in the Optics lab. These research led her to write her thesis degree, with the title "Some optical methods in determining the crystal structures by X-ray" and later to publish one of her first scientific papers in the field. In 1958 she completed the requirements for obtaining the title of Teacher of Physics and Mathematics, with distinction (summa cum laude).

In 1960 she moved, with her husband and two sons, to the Massachusetts Institute of Technology (Cambridge, Massachusetts, United States) to continue her crystallography studies under the Professor Martin J. Buerger. Her MSc Thesis, written in 1962, reported the determination, by X-ray crystallography, of the structure of hexatitanate potassium. During these years, she developed high expertise in the use of X-rays to determine the crystal structure of complex large molecules and she played a role in the determination of the structure terramycin (oxytetracycline). In 1964, she completed her PhD in Exact Sciences, "Crystal structure of the turquoise group minerals". Only four women had graduated before her in this department at MIT.

After her doctorate studies, she returned to Chile, where she created a new team of academics and researchers in the relatively new field of crystallography at the University of Chile. Later, she began to work as a full professor of Biophysics at the Austral University of Chile in Valdivia.

In 1974, after the military coup, Hilda and her family went into exile to Uppsala (Sweden). She joined the Wallenberg Protein Laboratory at the University of Uppsala, where she worked on the characterization by X-ray diffraction of large biological molecules. The team managed to determine the three-dimensional structure of carbonic anhydrase and a particular structure of G-actin binding to DNase I.

In 1979, she returned from exile carrying some scientific equipment from the University of Uppsala to the Laboratory of Molecular Biophysics at the University of Concepción. She continued to work at her alma mater until her retirement in 1996.

== Legacy ==
On top of her contributions to scientific research, Hilda is known for being a professor, an advocate for science education, an early visionary of the potential of interdisciplinary work and for her commitment to social justice and democracy.

In 1965, she participated in the foundation of the Chilean Physical Society (Sociedad Chilena de Física, SOCHIFI), where she remained as the only woman in the managing board until 2013.

In 1972, she actively participated in the First National Congress of Scientists, where the responsibility of the science community in the progress of society was recognised.

In the decade of 1980, she was essential for the organization of the Association of Academics of the University of Concepción, being elected president, and supported the student movement against the military intervention of universities.

In 2018, a hall auditorium was named after her at the University of Concepción.
