= Certified interconnect designer =

Certification for PCB design professionals

Certified Interconnect Designer (CID) is a certification from the IPC Designer's Council for experienced PCB design professionals. CID+ is the advanced version of this certification.
