= Cid (soil) =

Cid soil series is the name given to a soil which has developed from argillite or fine-grained metavolcanic rock in the Piedmont region of Virginia, North Carolina and South Carolina. It is moderately well or somewhat poorly drained, and moderately deep. Acidity ranges from strong to extreme except where lime has been applied. Cultivated soils in this series grow corn, soybeans, small grains and hay; otherwise, mixed forests with numerous species of pine and oak are dominant.

== Simplified profile description ==
The Cid Series represents moderately deep, moderately well drained to somewhat poorly drained soils in the Virginia, North Carolina and South Carolina Piedmont. Argillite and other fine-grained metavolcanic rocks lie beneath this series, which is derived from the weathering of these bedrock types.

A typical profile has the following characteristics (all color descriptions are for moist conditions):

A--O to 6 inches: Grayish brown silt loam; granular; very friable.

E--6 to 12 inches: Light yellowish brown silt loam; few fine faint brownish yellow mottles; granular; friable.

Bt1--12 to 19 inches: Brownish yellow silty clay; angular blocky structure; friable.

Bt2--19 to 26 inches: Olive yellow silty clay; angular blocky structure.

BC--26 to 29 inches: Olive yellow channery silty clay; weak subangular blocky structure.

Cr--29 to 34 inches: Weathered moderately fractured argillite; thin seams of gray silt loam in fractures.

R--34 inches: Argillite.

The Cid Series is extremely acid to strongly acid except in limed areas.
