= Tovrea Stockyards =

Feedlot in Phoenix, Arizona

Coordinates: 33°26′44.45″N 111°58′26.60″W

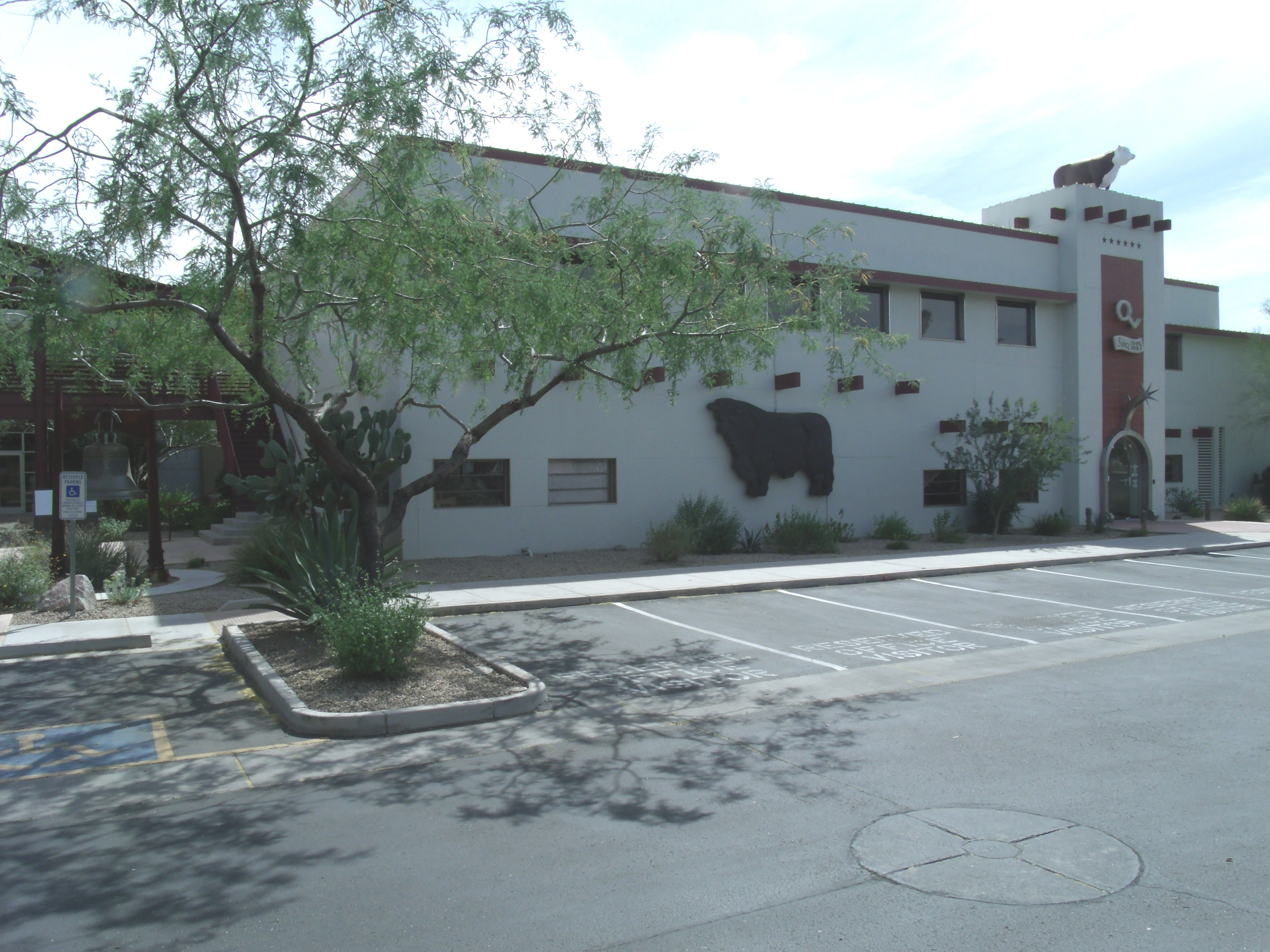
Former administration building

The Tovrea Stockyards were stockyards operated by the Tovrea Land and Cattle Company that existed in Phoenix, Arizona. Existing on 200 acres, it was once considered the largest feedlot in the world, until encroaching development led to its eventual closure in the late-20th century.

It also lends its name to the nearby Tovrea Castle, located to the north of the property.
