= CID The Dummy =

2009 video game

- Developer: Twelve Games
- Publisher: Oxygen Games
- Platforms: PlayStation 2 PlayStation Portable; Wii; Microsoft Windows
- Release: EU: April 17, 2009; NA: July 7, 2009
- Genres: Action-adventure; Platform
- Mode: Single-player

CID The Dummy is a 3D adventure video game released for the PlayStation 2, Wii, Microsoft Windows and PlayStation Portable on April 17, 2009, in Europe, and July 7 in North America.

== Plot ==
The game features a story about two scientists who were once colleagues and are now bitter rivals. After an experiment gone wrong, D. Troit, the game's villain, creates an army of sentient robots and kidnaps the daughter of B. M. Werken. Werken retaliates by creating a crash impact dummy, the hero and the game's playable character, to defeat D. Troit and his armies and save Werken's daughter. Werken is assisted by a small flying robot named Copcam.

== Reception ==
Reception

Aggregate scores
Aggregator	Score		
Aggregator	PS2	PSP	Wii
GameRankings	36%	36%	33%
Metacritic		41/100	31/100

Review score
Publication	Score		
Publication	PS2	PSP	Wii
Nintendo Life			3/10

CID The Dummy received negative reviews upon its release. On Metacritic, the game holds scores of 41/100 for the PlayStation Portable version based on 6 reviews, and 31/100 for the Wii version based on 7 reviews. On GameRankings, the game holds scores of 36.00% for the PlayStation 2 version based on 2 reviews, 35.60% for the PlayStation Portable version based on 5 reviews, and 33.43% for the Wii version based on 7 reviews.

== Demake ==
The demake Crash Dummy was developed by Twelve Games and published by Funbox Media and released digitally in 2019 for the Nintendo Switch on February 28, PC via Steam on March 1, and the Sony PlayStation 4 on March 4 respectively as a 2D side-scroller. The game was also met with poor reviews.
