= El Cid (disambiguation) =

El Cid, or Rodrigo Diaz de Vivar, was a medieval Spanish hero.

El Cid may also refer to:

- Cantar de mio Cid, a medieval Spanish epic poem
- Le Cid, a 1636 tragicomedy written by Pierre Corneille
- Le Cid (opera), an 1885 opera in four acts by Jules Massenet
- El Cid (film), a 1961 film
- El Cid (TV series), a Spanish historical action drama web television series
- El Cid: The Legend, a 2003 Spanish animated film
- El C.I.D., a British TV series in the 1990s
- EL CID-week, the annual summer introduction week for new students at Leiden University, the Netherlands
- Raoul "El Cid" Hernandez, a character in the American TV series Oz
- El Cid Historic District in West Palm Beach, Florida
- El Cid, a restaurant and performance venue in Los Angeles, California; formerly called Cabaret Concert Theatre
- El Cid Campeador (sculpture), an outdoor equestrian statue

== See also ==
- CID (disambiguation)
- Cid (disambiguation)
