= Tovrea Castle =

Historic house in Arizona, United States

- U.S. National Register of Historic Places
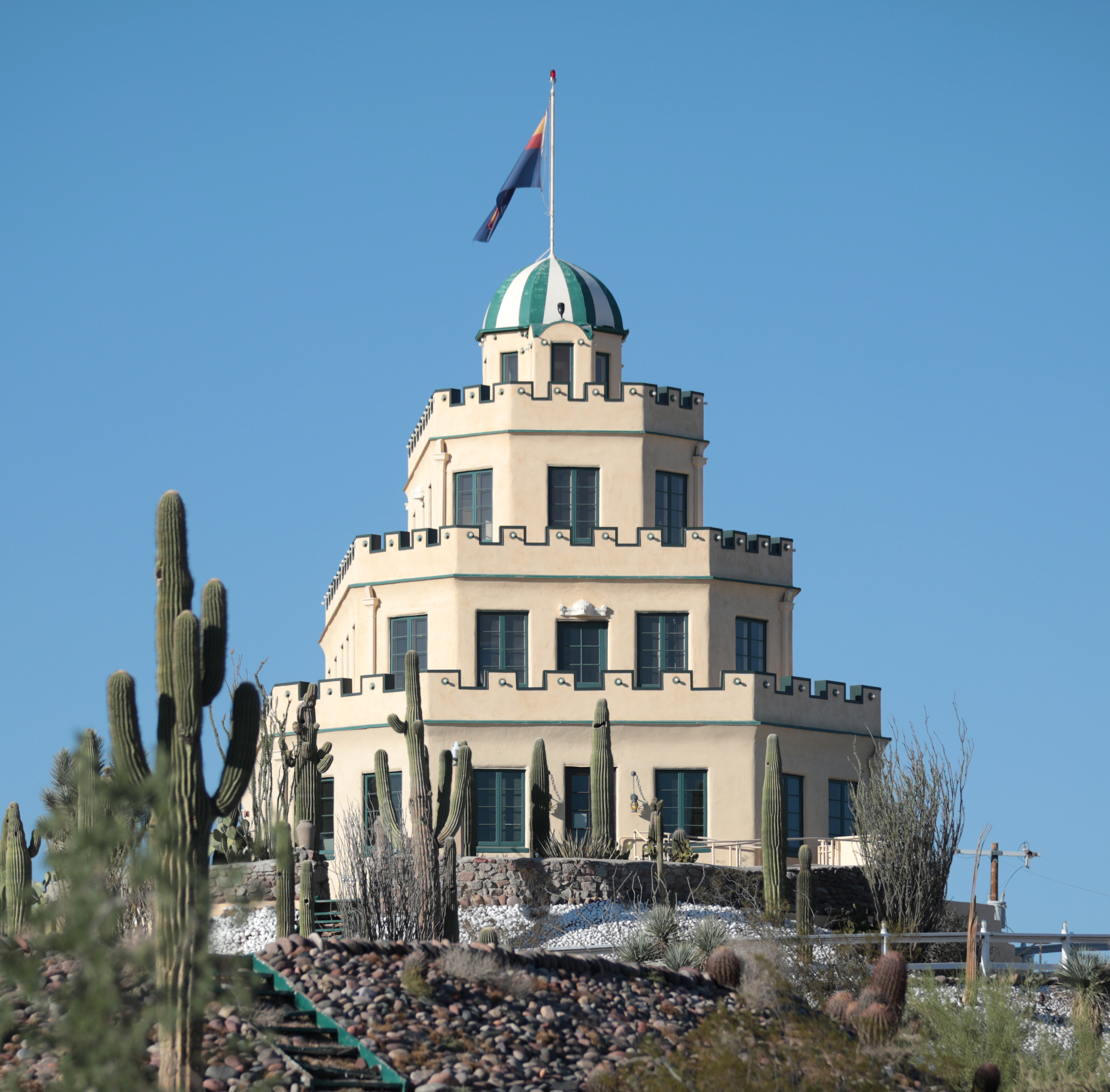
- (2022)

- Location within Arizona Location within the United States
- Location: 5041 E. Van Buren Street,, Phoenix, Arizona
- Coordinates: 33.4509°N 111.9732°W
- Area: 44 acres (18 ha)
- Built: December 1929 to January 1931
- Architect: Alessio Carraro
- Architectural style: Italianate Architecture
- NRHP reference No.: 96000309
- Added to NRHP: March 28, 1996

Tovrea Castle is a historic structure and landmark at 5041 East Van Buren Street in Phoenix, Arizona, on 44 acres (18 ha) bounded by the Red Mountain Freeway (State Route 202) to the east, Washington Street to the south, Van Buren Street to the north and the Main Post Office to the west. Locally known as the "Wedding Cake Castle," it was built from 1929 to 1931 in a vernacular Italianate Architectural Style by Alessio Carraro, and was originally intended as the hotel centerpiece of a planned destination resort. It became a private residence after its purchase in 1931 by E.A. and Della Tovrea. The castle is part of the Phoenix Parks System and is designated as one of the Phoenix Points of Pride. Plans were to fully open the site to the public in 2009, but cost overruns delayed the opening until 2012. The castle and grounds have over 5,000 individual cacti in over 100 different varieties, maintained by Tovrea Carraro Society. The Society offers guided tours of the grounds, first floor, and basement along with special events as the Operator and Manager of the site.

The castle was added to the National Register of Historic Places in 1996. Earlier names for the structure included "Carraro Heights" and "El Castillo". The signs label it "Tovrea Castle at Carrarro Heights".

== Tovrea Castle at Carraro Heights ==
Tovrea Castle at Carraro Heights is named in honor of the original builder, Alessio Carraro, and its second owners, E. A. and Della Tovrea. Contrary to local legend, the castle was not built by E. A. Tovrea for his wife as a duplication of their wedding cake. In fact, the Tovreas bought the castle from Alessio Carraro in 1931.

Although the castle had long been recognized as a city landmark, the deteriorated state of the grounds and the building left it unsuitable for use as a city park. After finalizing the purchase of the 44 acres surrounding the castle, the city of Phoenix began an effort to restore the building and revitalize the gardens.

In 2006, significant work began on restoring the gardens surrounding the castle. Diseased and dead plants were removed while surviving vegetation was rehabilitated. During restoration, 352 saguaro cacti were planted on the site and over 2,000 cacti were relocated. Other vegetation, including desert wildflowers, were planted in the gardens. The park boasts over 5,000 individual cacti in over 100 different varieties.

After much delay, the city of Phoenix finally completed the project by Arizona's centennial on February 14, 2012, including a visitors center. Tovrea Carraro Society, a local non profit organization, was formed to operate and manage the site in partnership with the city. It has been conducting guided tours of the grounds, first floor, and basement as well as holding special events since March 2012.

== Characteristics ==
An early sketch of a design for Carraro's intended hotel was made for him by a local architect that was immediately rejected, and bears little resemblance to the structure actually built. Carraro never intended to use the design and was intent on building the Castle similar to those he saw in his Italian homeland. Working with the solid granite grounds, his vision of the Castle became his own.

Tovrea Castle is a granite block, pine wood and stucco building constructed in a unique four-tier fashion bearing a strong resemblance to a traditional wedding cake, and as such has earned it the local nickname "The Wedding Cake Castle." The castle has historically eclectic and romanticized European architectural influences including parapets surrounding the roofline of each tier, while also reflecting Art Deco detailing within its interior and exterior light fixtures. In addition, the castle is lit during the night by LED bulbs distributed along the roofs and fences. The net result on viewing the castle from a distance is of a romanticized medieval castle, despite the absence of any architectural details supporting that perception.

The castle is highly visible from surrounding areas, and in particular drivers on Loop 202 are offered an excellent view of the site. This has led to the castle having become one of the most prominent Phoenix landmarks.

== See also ==
- List of historic properties in Phoenix, Arizona
- Phoenix Historic Property Register
- Mystery Castle
- El Cid Castle
