= Okemah =

Okemah may refer to:

== Places ==
- Okemah, Oklahoma, US
- Okemah, Phoenix, Arizona, US
- Okema Beach, Saskatchewan, Canada

== Music ==
- Okemah and the Melody of Riot, 2005 album by Son Volt
- Okemah Rising, 2023 album by Dropkick Murphys
