= Cactus Canyon High School =

School in Maricopa County, Arizona

Location
- 3921 West Baseline Road; Phoenix, Arizona 85339; United States; 33°22′33″N 112°08′45″W

Information
- Former names: Cesar Chavez High School (1999-2026); Champions Circle High School (2026)
- Type: Public secondary school
- Established: 1999; 27 years ago
- Principal: Robert Grant
- Teaching staff: 130.30 (on an FTE basis)
- Grades: 9–12
- Enrollment: 2,644 (2023-2024)
- Student to teacher ratio: 20.29
- Colors: Purple and Silver
- Mascot: Champion
- Website: www.pxu.org/o/cchs

Cactus Canyon High School is part of the Phoenix Union High School District. The campus is located at 3921 West Baseline Road, south of Phoenix, in Laveen, Arizona. Cactus Canyon's enrollment is approximately 2,499 students, over 65 percent of whom are Hispanic. The school predominantly serves students from partner elementary districts Laveen and Roosevelt; however, students from across the district come to Cactus Canyon for large Advanced Placement and Honors program, Freshmen House, performing arts, and athletic programs.

== History ==
Cactus Canyon High School opened in 1999, and was formerly named Cesar Chavez High School after late American labor leader and civil rights activist Cesar Chavez.

In light of the sexual abuse allegations against Chavez that were raised earlier that month, the Phoenix Union High School District voted to remove Chavez's name from the high school on March 26, 2026, temporarily renaming the school Champions Circle High School. On May 7, 2026, the school district voted and announced that the school would be officially named Cactus Canyon High School. The new name will take effect at the beginning of the 2026-2027 school year.

== Notable alumni ==
- TyTy Washington Jr., basketball player
