= Amelia Villaseñor =

Palaeoecologist

- Education: George Washington University
- Scientific career
- Fields: Palaeoecology
- Workplaces: University of Arkansas

Amelia Villaseñor is an American paleoecologist best known for her study of Quaternary palaeoenvironments and the impacts of hominins on them. Members of her research team have taken part in several projects across the world, including North America, Zambia, and Kenya.

== Early life and education ==
Villaseñor grew up in South Phoenix, Arizona. She is Mexican-American. She attended graduate school at George Washington University, earning both a Master's degree and PhD in Human Paleobiology. In spring 2015, was given a Leakey Foundation grant for her dissertation project "The biogeography and behavioral ecology of hominins in Pliocene Eastern Africa: A macroecological perspective".

== Career ==
Villaseñor is an associate professor in the Department of Anthropology at the University of Arkansas. She has published a number of papers examining the ecology of early hominins.

In 2020, Villaseñor joined a project exploring the Natodomeri site in northwest Kenya. In 2025, Villaseñor participated in an archaeological dig in the Turkana Basin in Kenya that found 2.75 million-year-old stone tools.

== Awards and recognitions ==
- 2025 OMNI Keeling/Hansen Climate Science Award, University of Arkansas

== Selected publications ==
- Tóth, Anikó B.; Lyons, S. Kathleen; Barr, W. Andrew; Behrensmeyer, Anna K.; Blois, Jessica L.; Bobe, René; Davis, Matt; Du, Andrew; Eronen, Jussi T.; Faith, J. Tyler; Fraser, Danielle; Gotelli, Nicholas J.; Graves, Gary R.; Jukar, Advait M.; Miller, Joshua H. (20 September 2019). "Reorganization of surviving mammal communities after the end-Pleistocene megafaunal extinction". Science. 365 (6459): 1305–1308. Bibcode:2019Sci...365.1305T. doi:10.1126/science.aaw1605. hdl:10138/327004. PMID 31604240.
- Villaseñor, Amelia; Bobe, René; Behrensmeyer, Anna K. (October 2020). "Middle Pliocene hominin distribution patterns in Eastern Africa". Journal of Human Evolution. 147 102856. Bibcode:2020JHumE.14702856V. doi:10.1016/j.jhevol.2020.102856. PMID 32866766.
- Fraser, Danielle; Villaseñor, Amelia; Tóth, Anikó B.; Balk, Meghan A.; Eronen, Jussi T.; Andrew Barr, W.; Behrensmeyer, A. K.; Davis, Matt; Du, Andrew; Tyler Faith, J.; Graves, Gary R.; Gotelli, Nicholas J.; Jukar, Advait M.; Looy, Cindy V.; McGill, Brian J. (8 July 2022). "Late quaternary biotic homogenization of North American mammalian faunas". Nature Communications. 13 (1): 3940. Bibcode:2022NatCo..13.3940F. doi:10.1038/s41467-022-31595-8. PMC 9270452. PMID 35803946.
- Smith, Felisa A.; Elliott Smith, Emma A.; Villaseñor, Amelia; Tomé, Catalina P.; Lyons, S. Kathleen; Newsome, Seth D. (27 September 2022). "Late Pleistocene megafauna extinction leads to missing pieces of ecological space in a North American mammal community". Proceedings of the National Academy of Sciences. 119 (39) e2115015119. Bibcode:2022PNAS..11915015S. doi:10.1073/pnas.2115015119. PMC 9522422. PMID 36122233.
- Braun, David R.; Palcu Rolier, Dan V.; Advokaat, Eldert L.; Archer, Will; Baraki, Niguss G.; Biernat, Maryse D.; Beaudoin, Ella; Behrensmeyer, Anna K.; Bobe, René; Elmes, Katherine; Forrest, Frances; Hammond, Ashley S.; Jovane, Luigi; Kinyanjui, Rahab N.; de Martini, Ana P. (4 November 2025). "Early Oldowan technology thrived during Pliocene environmental change in the Turkana Basin, Kenya". Nature Communications. 16 (1): 9401. doi:10.1038/s41467-025-64244-x. PMC 12586688. PMID 41188262.
