= Sachs-Webster House =

Sears Catalog Home in Laveen, Arizona

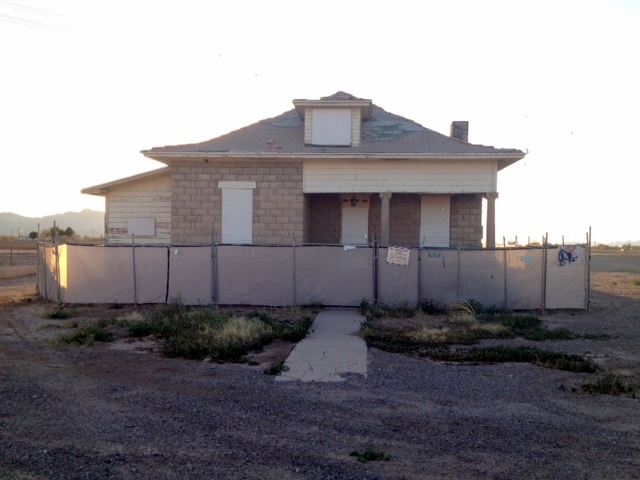
- Interactive map of the Sachs-Webster House area

General information
- Status: Unrestored
- Location: 7515 W. Baseline Road, Laveen, Arizona
- Coordinates: 33.37592°N 112.22068°W
- Completed: 1909
- Owner: City of Phoenix

Design and construction
- Architect: Sears Catalog Home

The Sachs-Webster House or Farmstead is an historic site and structure located in Laveen, Arizona. On the farmstead is a turn-of-the-20th-Century Sears Catalog Home built by "the original settlers of the community of Laveen".

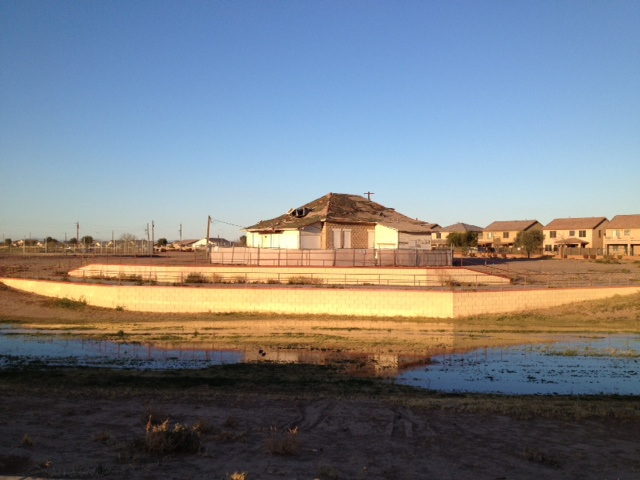
Sachs-Webster farmstead
