= Laveen Elementary School District =

School district in Maricopa County, Arizona

Address
- 5001 West Dobbins Road Laveen, Arizona, 85339; United States

District information
- Type: Public
- Grades: PreK–8
- NCES District ID: 0404290

Students and staff
- Students: 7,242
- Teachers: 407.99
- Staff: 378.05
- Student–teacher ratio: 17.75

Other information
- Website: www.laveenschools.org

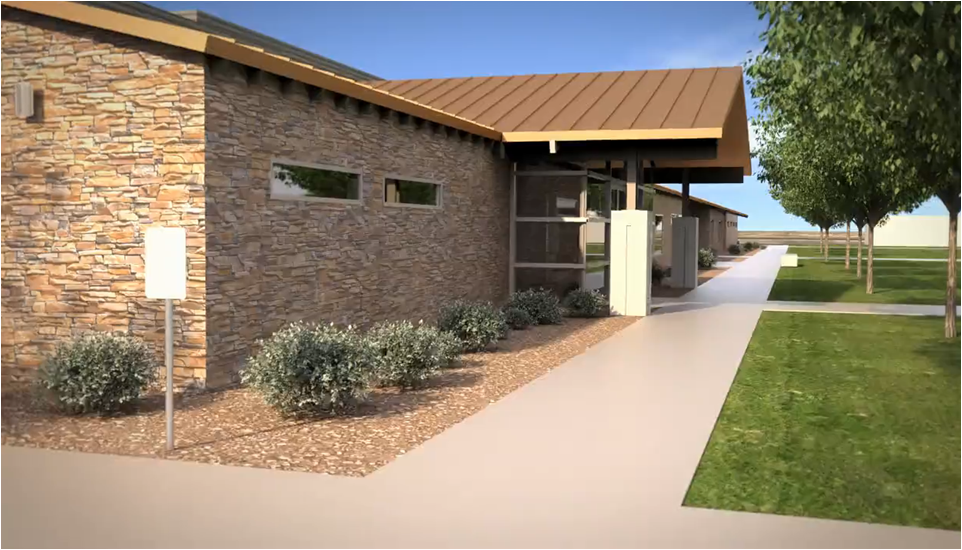
Laveen Ed Center Rendering

The Laveen Elementary School District is the K–8 school district for Laveen, an area of southwest Phoenix, Arizona, USA. It operates nine schools, serving about 7,500 students in 2023. Laveen ESD is one of 13 elementary school districts in the Phoenix area that feed into the Phoenix Union High School District.

== Schools ==
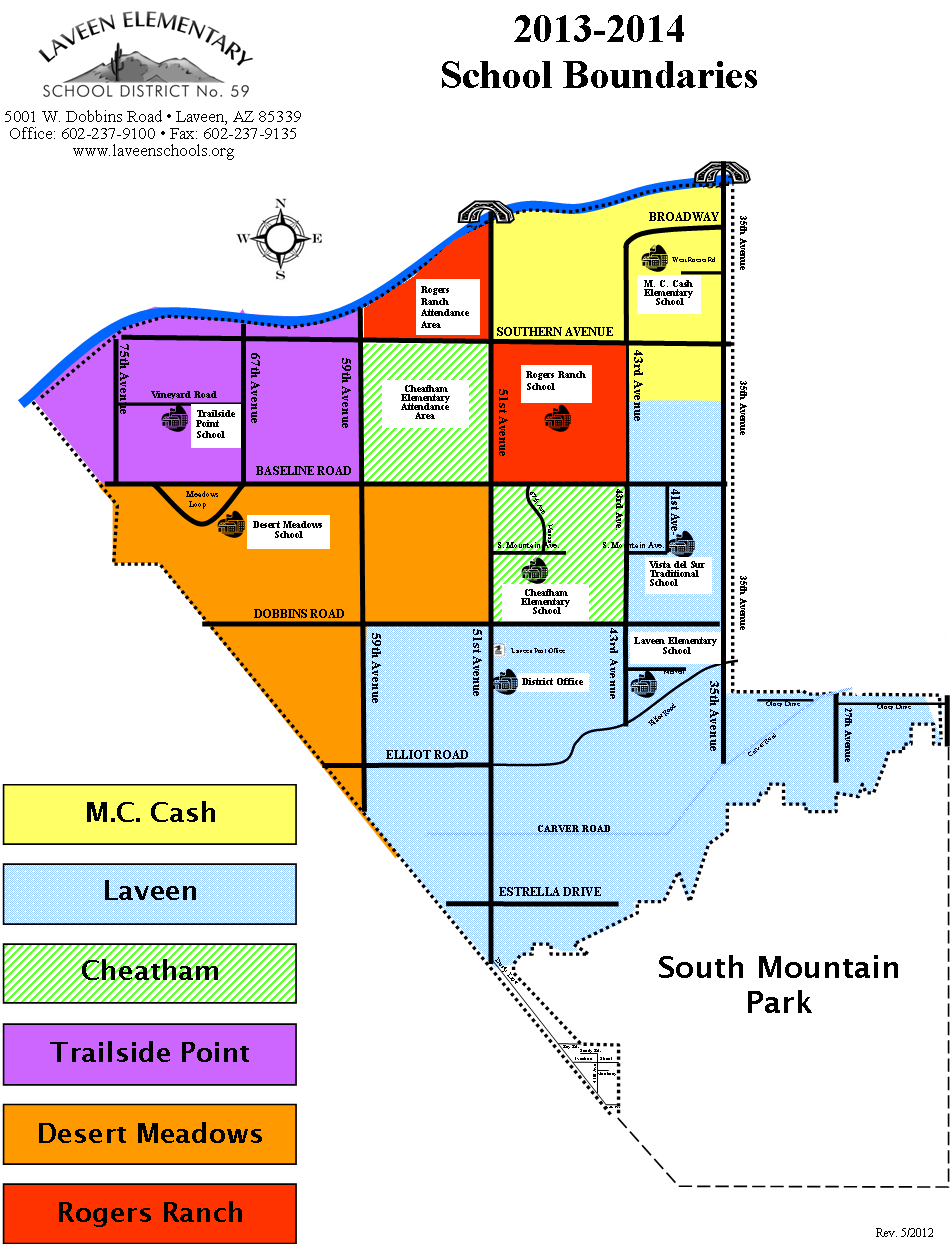
Laveen School District Boundary Map

- Laveen Leadership Academy at Cheatham Farms (opened 2002)
- Desert Meadows (opened 2007)
- Laveen Elementary (opened at its original location on Dobbins Road near 51st Ave. 1913, reopened at its current location 2011)
- Laveen Traditional Academy (opened 2026)
- M.C. Cash Elementary (completed in 1964)
- Trailside Point Performing Arts Academy (opened 2006)
- Vista del Sur Accelerated Academy (formerly Vista Del Sur Traditional School) (Opened 1998)
- Rogers Ranch STEM Academy (opened 2012)
- Paseo Pointe Dual Language Academy (opened 2016)
- Estrella Foothills Global Academy (opened 2020)

== History ==
County records indicate that school classes were held in the Laveen area as early as 1884 in the homes of early Mexican and Latter-day Saint settlers. School District No. 59, originally known as the Harovitz District, was formally created on August 8, 1908. The location of the first school is given as one-eighth mile south of Southern Avenue on 67th Avenue. At that time, the school district boundary was between the Salt River on the North and Baseline Road on the South, and between 35th Avenue on the East and the Gila River Indian Community on the West. In 1913, Walter Laveen donated land on the south side of Dobbins Road east of 51st Avenue for a new school. On September 30, 1913, the school was officially named Laveen Elementary School.

One of the early school buildings still remains at the original Laveen School site on Dobbins Road east of 51st Avenue. This building, the Laveen School Auditorium, commonly referred to as "Building A", is on the National Register of Historic Places. It was first constructed as the Laveen Women's Club Hall and used for club meetings, dances, plays and community gatherings. In 1940, the building was donated to the school and, with financial assistance from the Work Projects Administration (WPA), was dismantled from its original location and moved about a quarter mile east to the school property where it was placed over a basement dug for that purpose and rebuilt with adobe walls. Once reconstructed on the Laveen School campus, the main floor, equipped with a stage, served as the auditorium and the basement was used as a cafeteria. In 1979, a new cafeteria was constructed on the Laveen School campus and the old building was converted into a home economics classroom on the main level and an industrial arts shop in the basement. After 1988, the building was retired from active educational use and became overflow storage for the school district.

Laveen was a one-school district until the opening of Maurice C. Cash School in the early 1960s, which was built on land donated by Mr. Cash, a Laveen farmer. Both schools, Laveen and M. C. Cash, served kindergarten through 8th grade until the third school, Vista del Sur Middle School, opened in 1998. At that time, Laveen School and M. C. Cash School ended with the sixth grade with Vista del Sur serving seventh and eighth grades.

The Laveen area began to experience substantial residential development in the early 2000s with the result of dramatic increases in student enrollment. During this decade, student enrollments increased by as much as 30-percent a year. With increasing residential development, a fourth school serving kindergarten through sixth grade, Cheatham Elementary, opened in 2002 on land donated by Roy Cheatham. The new Trailside Point School opened in spring 2006, followed by the opening of the new Desert Meadows School in fall 2007. Rogers Ranch School opened in fall 2012 on nine acres donated by the Rogers family together with another four acres purchased from the City of Phoenix.

Starting with the 2006–2007 school year, Vista del Sur was converted from a middle school into a traditional school serving kindergarten through 8th grade. With the elimination of Laveen's only middle school, the grade level configuration at all of the schools was changed back to kindergarten through 8th grade.

With funding through a bond approved by voters in 2008, Laveen School was rebuilt on a new site purchased from the John F. Long Trust, located south of Dobbins Road on the east side of 43rd Avenue. The new Laveen School opened in fall 2011. With the exception of the historical Laveen School Auditorium (Building A), the old Laveen campus has been demolished and replaced with the new Laveen Education Center, which includes meeting rooms, training rooms, the governing board room and district administrative offices. Initially, four classroom buildings in the old school were kept and leased to South Mountain Community College for its Laveen campus. When the college decided to move to newer and more modern facilities, a decision that was, perhaps, accelerated by flash floods in fall 2014 that inundated the buildings with flood water, plans were made to remove the remaining old buildings. The Laveen School Auditorium (Building A) is incorporated into the new Laveen Education Center where it continues to serve as a meeting place for community groups including the Laveen Community Council, Laveen Citizens for Responsible Development and the Laveen Art League.

The 2008 bond funds were also used to rebuild Maurice C. Cash School on the original site. The new buildings were constructed on the northern playground of the occupied campus. The new buildings were occupied over winter break of the 2012–2013 school year and classes were held in the new school in spring 2013. Once the move into the new buildings was complete, the old school buildings were demolished and a new playground constructed where the old buildings had been.

A bond approved by voters in 2015 helped fund the construction of the district's eighth school, Paseo Pointe. Similar to the other schools in the district, Paseo Pointe, which opened in fall 2016, is designed to serve about 1,000 students in grades K–8. The new facility also has three rooms that are used for the preschool program. Paseo Pointe School offers a dual language immersion program in which students are taught basic content (mathematics, science, social studies) in both English and Spanish.
