= 2022–23 NBA G League season =

- League: NBA G League
- Sport: Basketball
- Duration: November 4, 2022 – April 6, 2023
- Teams: 30

Draft
- Top draft pick: Sam Merrill
- Picked by: Cleveland Charge

Regular season
- Top seed: Long Island Nets; Stockton Kings
- Season MVP: Carlik Jones (Windy City Bulls)
- Finals champions: Delaware Blue Coats
- Runners-up: Rio Grande Valley Vipers
- Finals MVP: Jaden Springer (Delaware Blue Coats)

NBA G League seasons
- ← 2021–22 2023–24 →

The 2022–23 NBA G League season was the 22nd season of the NBA G League, the minor league basketball league of the National Basketball Association (NBA). For the second consecutive season, the schedule was split into two parts: the 18-game Showcase Cup began on November 4, 2022, followed by a 32-game regular season tipped off on December 27. The Delaware Blue Coats defeated the Rio Grande Valley Vipers 2–0 in the 2023 NBA G League Finals.

== Structure ==
The Showcase Cup began on November 4, 2022, and it will end with a single-elimination tournament to crown a champion at the G League's Winter Showcase from December 19 to 22. During the Showcase Cup, teams are separated into four regional pods and play 16 games against one another in each respective NBA G League markets. The teams with the best winning percentage in each regional pod, along with the next four teams across the league with the best win-percentages, will advance to compete for the Showcase Cup during Winter Showcase.

== Notable occurrences ==
- Each game that ends in overtime had an Elam ending, with a "target score" of seven points to win the game.
- The NBA G League Ignite debuted its new home arena, The Dollar Loan Center, in Henderson, Nevada, on November 6 against the Oklahoma City Blue.
- The Capitanes de la Ciudad de México hosted the first-ever NBA G League regular season game played in México at the Arena Ciudad de México when it took on the defending champion Rio Grande Valley Vipers on November 6.
- The Agua Caliente Clippers were renamed to the Ontario Clippers for the 2022–23 season.
- The NBA G League Next Up Game took place on February 19 during the 2023 NBA All-Star weekend in Salt Lake City.

== Showcase Cup ==
=== Standings ===
==== Central ====
Pos	Team	W	L	PCT	GB
1	Fort Wayne Mad Ants (IND)	12	6	.667	—
2	Cleveland Charge (CLE)	12	6	.667	—
3	Windy City Bulls (CHI)	12	7	.632	0.5
4	Iowa Wolves (MIN)	11	7	.611	1
5	Sioux Falls Skyforce (MIA)	11	7	.611	1
6	Wisconsin Herd (MIL)	8	10	.444	4
7	Grand Rapids Gold (DEN)	5	13	.278	7
8	Motor City Cruise (DET)	4	14	.222	8

Source: GLeague.NBA.com

==== East ====
Pos	Team	W	L	PCT	GB
1	College Park Skyhawks (ATL)	12	6	.667	—
2	Maine Celtics (BOS)	11	7	.611	1
3	Long Island Nets (BKN)	10	8	.556	2
4	Capital City Go-Go (WAS)	9	9	.500	3
5	Delaware Blue Coats (PHI)	8	10	.444	4
6	Greensboro Swarm (CHA)	7	11	.389	5
7	Raptors 905 (TOR)	7	11	.389	5
8	Westchester Knicks (NYK)	6	12	.333	6

Source: GLeague.NBA.com

==== South ====
Pos	Team	W	L	PCT	GB
1	Rio Grande Valley Vipers (HOU)	13	5	.722	—
2	Capitanes de la Ciudad de México	12	6	.667	1
3	Memphis Hustle (MEM)	11	7	.611	2
4	Texas Legends (DAL)	9	9	.500	4
5	Lakeland Magic (ORL)	7	11	.389	6
6	Birmingham Squadron (NO)	6	12	.333	7
7	Austin Spurs (SAS)	5	13	.278	8

Source: GLeague.NBA.com

==== West ====
Pos	Team	W	L	PCT	GB
1	Ontario Clippers (LAC)	15	4	.789	—
2	South Bay Lakers (LAL)	13	5	.722	1.5
3	Stockton Kings (SAC)	9	9	.500	5.5
4	Oklahoma City Blue (OKC)	8	10	.444	6.5
5	Santa Cruz Warriors (GSW)	8	10	.444	6.5
6	Salt Lake City Stars (UTA)	6	12	.333	8.5
7	NBA G League Ignite	4	14	.222	10.5

Source: GLeague.NBA.com

=== Showcase Cup Tournament ===
Quarterfinals; December 19
1	South Bay Lakers	106
8	Maine Celtics	112
4	Ontario Clippers	121
5	Iowa Wolves	95
3	College Park Skyhawks	104
6	Cleveland Charge	120
2	Rio Grande Valley Vipers	96
7	Windy City Bulls	102

Semifinals; December 20
8	Maine Celtics	112
4	Ontario Clippers	124
6	Cleveland Charge	94
7	Windy City Bulls	96

Showcase Cup Championship; December 22
4	Ontario Clippers	99
7	Windy City Bulls	97

=== Statistics ===
Category	Player	Team(s)	Statistic
Points per game	Luka Garza	Iowa Wolves	29.8
Rebounds per game	Orlando Robinson	Sioux Falls Skyforce	12.8
Assists per game	Chris Chiozza	Long Island Nets	10.4
Steals per game	Shaquille Harrison	South Bay Lakers	2.6
Blocks per game	Jay Huff	South Bay Lakers	3.2

Source: NBA G League Statistics

== Standings ==
=== Regular season ===
==== Eastern Conference ====
Pos	Team	W	L	PCT	GB
1	y – Long Island Nets (BKN)	23	9	.719	—
2	x – Delaware Blue Coats (PHI)	20	12	.625	3
3	x – Capital City Go-Go (WAS)	19	13	.594	4
4	x – Maine Celtics (BOS)	19	13	.594	4
5	x – Cleveland Charge (CLE)	18	14	.563	5
6	x – Fort Wayne Mad Ants (IND)	18	14	.563	5
7	e – Windy City Bulls (CHI)	18	14	.563	5
8	e – Lakeland Magic (ORL)	18	14	.563	5
9	e – Motor City Cruise (DET)	17	15	.531	6
10	e – Raptors 905 (TOR)	16	16	.500	7
11	e – College Park Skyhawks (ATL)	15	17	.469	8
12	e – Greensboro Swarm (CHA)	11	21	.344	12
13	e – Wisconsin Herd (MIL)	11	21	.344	12
14	e – Grand Rapids Gold (DEN)	9	23	.281	14
15	e – Westchester Knicks (NYK)	9	23	.281	14

Source: GLeague.NBA.com
e – Eliminated; x – Qualified for playoffs; y – Clinched top seed

=== Western Conference ===
Pos	Team	W	L	PCT	GB
1	y – Stockton Kings (SAC)	25	7	.781	—
2	x – Memphis Hustle (MEM)	23	9	.719	2
3	x – South Bay Lakers (LAL)	21	11	.656	4
4	x – Salt Lake City Stars (UTA)	20	12	.625	5
5	x – Sioux Falls Skyforce (MIA)	20	12	.625	5
6	x – Rio Grande Valley Vipers (HOU)	18	14	.563	7
7	e – Santa Cruz Warriors (GSW)	18	14	.563	7
8	e – Capitanes de la Ciudad de México	18	14	.563	7
9	e – Ontario Clippers (LAC)	17	15	.531	8
10	e – Oklahoma City Blue (OKC)	13	19	.406	12
11	e – NBA G League Ignite	11	21	.344	14
12	e – Birmingham Squadron (NO)	11	21	.344	14
13	e – Iowa Wolves (MIN)	9	23	.281	16
14	e – Austin Spurs (SAS)	8	24	.250	17
15	e – Texas Legends (DAL)	7	25	.219	18

Source: GLeague.NBA.com
e – Eliminated; x – Qualified for playoffs; y – Clinched top seed

== Playoffs ==
- Quarterfinals: March 28 & March 29
- Semifinals: March 30 & March 31
- Conference Finals: April 2
- G League Finals: April 4 & April 6

For the first time since the 2014–15 NBA Development League season, two teams played against each other in the Finals for the second straight year, as the Rio Grande Valley Vipers faced the Delaware Blue Coats in a rematch from 2022, where the Vipers had won in two games. Delaware, who previously reached the Finals in 2021 and 2022, was the first team since the Santa Cruz Warriors (2013–2015) to reach the Finals in three straight years. The Vipers were the fifth defending champion to reach the Finals the following year. The Blue Coats won in a straight sweep for their first title.

Conference Quarterfinals	Conference Semifinals
1	Long Island Nets	111
5	Cleveland Charge	107
4	Maine Celtics	100
5	Cleveland Charge	113
Eastern Conference
2	Delaware Blue Coats	104
3	Capital City Go-Go	99
3	Capital City Go-Go	101
6	Fort Wayne Mad Ants	87
1	Stockton Kings	97
5	Sioux Falls Skyforce	98
4	Salt Lake City Stars	107
5	Sioux Falls Skyforce	115
Western Conference
2	Memphis Hustle	108
6	Rio Grande Valley Vipers	110
3	South Bay Lakers	122
6	Rio Grande Valley Vipers	124

Conference Finals
1	Long Island Nets	94
2	Delaware Blue Coats	108
5	Sioux Falls Skyforce	105
6	Rio Grande Valley Vipers	110

Finals; Best-of-three
E2	Delaware Blue Coats	134	114
W6	Rio Grande Valley Vipers	120	110

=== Finals boxscore ===
April 4, 2023
9:00 p.m. ET

Boxscore

Rio Grande Valley Vipers 120, Delaware Blue Coats 134
Scoring by quarter: 21–41, 36–33, 33–36, 24–30
Pts: TyTy Washington Jr. 34; Rebs: TyTy Washington Jr. 11; Asts: TyTy Washington Jr. 8	Pts: Jaden Springer 43; Rebs: Charlie Brown Jr. 15; Asts: Mac McClung 7

Chase Fieldhouse, Wilmington, Delaware
Attendance: 1,545
Referees:
- #34 Brent Haskill
- #73 Pat O'Connell
- #46 Intae Hwang
- #41 Tyler Mirkovich

April 6, 2023
8:30 p.m. ET

Boxscore

Delaware Blue Coats 114, Rio Grande Valley Vipers 110
Scoring by quarter: 28–26, 32–31, 30–17, 24–36
Pts: Mac McClung 30; Rebs: Jaden Springer, Justin Smith, Louis King 9 Asts: Mac McClung 8	Pts: TyTy Washington Jr. 38; Rebs: Darius Days 15; Asts: TyTy Washington Jr. 5
Delaware wins series, 2–0

Bert Ogden Arena, Edinburg, Texas
Attendance: 6,117
Referees:
- #80 JD Ralls
- #77 Jenna Reneau
- #18 Isaac Barnett
- #63 Sha'Rae Mitchell

== Awards ==
Most Valuable Player:

- Carlik Jones for the Windy City Bulls (via the Chicago Bulls)

Defensive Player of the Year:

- Jay Huff for the Capital City Go-Go (via the Washington Wizards)

Rookie of the Year:

- Kenneth Lofton Jr. for the Memphis Hustle (via the Memphis Grizzlies)

=== All-NBA G League First Team ===
Player	G League Team	NBA team and contract
Carlik Jones	Windy City Bulls	Two-way contract with the Chicago Bulls
Neemias Queta	Stockton Kings	Two-way contract with the Sacramento Kings
David Duke Jr.	Long Island Nets	Two-way contract with the Brooklyn Nets
Kenneth Lofton Jr.	Memphis Hustle	Two-way contract with the Memphis Grizzlies
Jay Huff	Capital City Go-Go	Two-way contract with the Washington Wizards

=== All-NBA G League Second Team ===
Player	G League Team	NBA team and contract
Sharife Cooper	Cleveland Charge	None
Jamaree Bouyea	Sioux Falls Skyforce	None
Darius Days	Rio Grande Valley Vipers	Two-way contract with the Houston Rockets
Mfiondu Kabengele	Maine Celtics	Two-way contract with the Boston Celtics
Luka Samanic	Maine Celtics	None

=== All-NBA G League Third Team ===
Player	G League Team	NBA team and contract
Chris Chiozza	Long Island Nets	None
Xavier Moon	Ontario Clippers	Two-way contract with the Los Angeles Clippers
Isaiah Mobley	Cleveland Charge	Two-way contract with the Cleveland Cavaliers
Moussa Diabate	Ontario Clippers	Two-way contract with the Los Angeles Clippers
Justin Anderson	Fort Wayne Mad Ants	None
