= TyTy Washington Jr. =

American basketball player (born 2001)

- Washington with ASVEL in 2026

No. 3 – ASVEL
- Position: Point guard
- League: LNB Élite; EuroLeague

Personal information
- Born: November 15, 2001 (age 25) Phoenix, Arizona, U.S.
- Listed height: 1.92 m (6 ft 4 in)
- Listed weight: 88 kg (194 lb)

Career information
- High school: Cesar Chavez (Phoenix, Arizona); AZ Compass Prep (Chandler, Arizona)
- College: Kentucky (2021–2022)
- NBA draft: 2022: 1st round, 29th overall pick
- Drafted by: Memphis Grizzlies
- Playing career: 2022–present

Career history
- 2022–2023: Houston Rockets
- 2022–2023: →Rio Grande Valley Vipers
- 2023–2024: Milwaukee Bucks
- 2023–2024: →Wisconsin Herd
- 2024–2025: Phoenix Suns
- 2024–2025: →Valley Suns
- 2025: San Diego Clippers
- 2025–2026: Los Angeles Clippers
- 2025–2026: →San Diego Clippers
- 2026–present: ASVEL

Career highlights
- NBA G League Next Up Game (2025); Second-team All-SEC (2022); SEC All-Freshman team (2022)
- Stats at NBA.com
- Stats at Basketball Reference

Tyrone Lewis "TyTy" Washington Jr. (born November 15, 2001) is an American professional basketball player for ASVEL of the LNB Élite and the EuroLeague. He played college basketball for the Kentucky Wildcats. Washington was a consensus five-star recruit and one of the top point guards in the 2021 class.

== High school career ==
Washington played basketball for Cesar Chavez High School in Phoenix, Arizona. As a sophomore, he averaged 23.2 points, 4.1 assists, 4.4 rebounds, and 3.3 steals per game. Washington transferred to AZ Compass Prep School in Chandler, Arizona during his junior season. As a senior, he averaged 24 points, seven assists, and six rebounds per game, leading his team to a 30–2 record. He was named to the Jordan Brand Classic roster.

=== Recruiting ===
Washington was a consensus five-star recruit and one of the top point guards in the 2021 class. On November 15, 2020, he committed to playing college basketball for Creighton. He decommitted on March 11, 2021. On May 12, 2021, Washington committed to Kentucky over offers from Arizona, Baylor, Kansas, LSU and Oregon.

College recruiting
Name	Hometown	School	Height	Weight	Commit date
TyTy Washington; PG	Phoenix, AZ	AZ Compass Prep (AZ)	6 ft 3 in (1.91 m)	185 lb (84 kg)	May 12, 2021
TyTy Washington; PG	Recruit ratings: Rivals: 247Sports: ESPN: (94)				
Overall recruit ranking: Rivals: 14 247Sports: 19 ESPN: 14
Note: In many cases, Scout, Rivals, 247Sports, On3, and ESPN may conflict in their listings of height and weight.; In these cases, the average was taken. ESPN grades are on a 100-point scale.; Sources: "Kentucky 2021 Basketball Commitments". Rivals.; "2021 Kentucky Wildcats Recruiting Class". ESPN.; "2021 Team Ranking". Rivals.

== College career ==
On January 8, 2022, Washington recorded 17 points and 17 assists in a 92–77 win against Georgia, surpassing John Wall's single-game school record for assists. On January 15, Washington scored a career-high 28 points in a 107–79 win against Tennessee. As a freshman, Washington averaged 12.5 points, 3.9 assists, and 3.5 rebounds per game. He was named to the Second Team All-SEC as well as the All-Freshman Team. On April 6, Washington declared for the 2022 NBA draft, forgoing his remaining college eligibility.

== Professional career ==
=== Houston Rockets (2022–2023) ===
Washington was selected by the Memphis Grizzlies with the 29th overall pick in the 2022 NBA draft. The Grizzlies traded Washington and Walker Kessler to the Minnesota Timberwolves on draft night for Jake LaRavia. The Timberwolves subsequently traded Washington to the Houston Rockets for Wendell Moore. On October 2, 2022, Washington made his preseason debut, registering eight points along with three rebounds and one assist in a 134–96 win against the San Antonio Spurs.

On July 8, 2023, Washington was traded to the Atlanta Hawks in a five-team trade. On July 12, he was traded again, this time to the Oklahoma City Thunder, along with Usman Garuba, Rudy Gay and a 2026 second-round pick, in exchange for Patty Mills. On August 18, he was waived by the Thunder.

=== Milwaukee Bucks (2023–2024) ===
On August 29, 2023, Washington signed a two-way contract with the Milwaukee Bucks.

=== Phoenix Suns (2024–2025) ===
On August 2, 2024, Washington signed a two-way contract with the Phoenix Suns. He made 16 appearances for Phoenix during the 2024–25 NBA season, averaging 2.2 points, 0.8 rebounds, and 1.0 assists.

On October 14, 2025, Washington signed a training camp contract with the Los Angeles Clippers. He was waived prior to the start of the regular season on October 18.

=== Los Angeles Clippers (2025–2026) ===
On December 27, 2025, Washington signed a two-way contract with the Los Angeles Clippers following a great season with their NBA G League affiliate, San Diego Clippers.

=== ASVEL (2026–present) ===
On August 24, 2026, Washington signed with ASVEL of the LNB Élite and the EuroLeague.

== Career statistics ==
Legend
GP	Games played	GS	Games started	MPG	Minutes per game
FG%	Field goal percentage	3P%	3-point field goal percentage	FT%	Free throw percentage
RPG	Rebounds per game	APG	Assists per game	SPG	Steals per game
BPG	Blocks per game	PPG	Points per game	**Bold**	Career high

=== NBA ===
Year	Team	GP	GS	MPG	FG%	3P%	FT%	RPG	APG	SPG	BPG	PPG
2022–23	Houston	**31**	**2**	**14.0**	.363	.238	**.556**	**1.5**	**1.5**	**.5**	.1	**4.7**
2023–24	Milwaukee	11	0	5.1	.300	.333	—	.5	.5	.3	.0	1.3
2024–25	Phoenix	16	0	7.4	.311	.190	.500	.8	1.0	.2	.0	2.2
2025–26	L.A. Clippers	16	0	5.5	**.474**	**.375**	—	.4	1.1	.4	**.2**	1.3
Career		74	2	9.4	.357	.243	.542	.9	1.1	.4	.1	2.9

=== College ===
Year	Team	GP	GS	MPG	FG%	3P%	FT%	RPG	APG	SPG	BPG	PPG
2021–22	Kentucky	31	29	29.2	.451	.350	.750	4.5	3.9	1.3	.2	12.5
