= South Phoenix =

Region of Phoenix, Arizona

Coordinates: 33°24′24″N 112°04′24″W

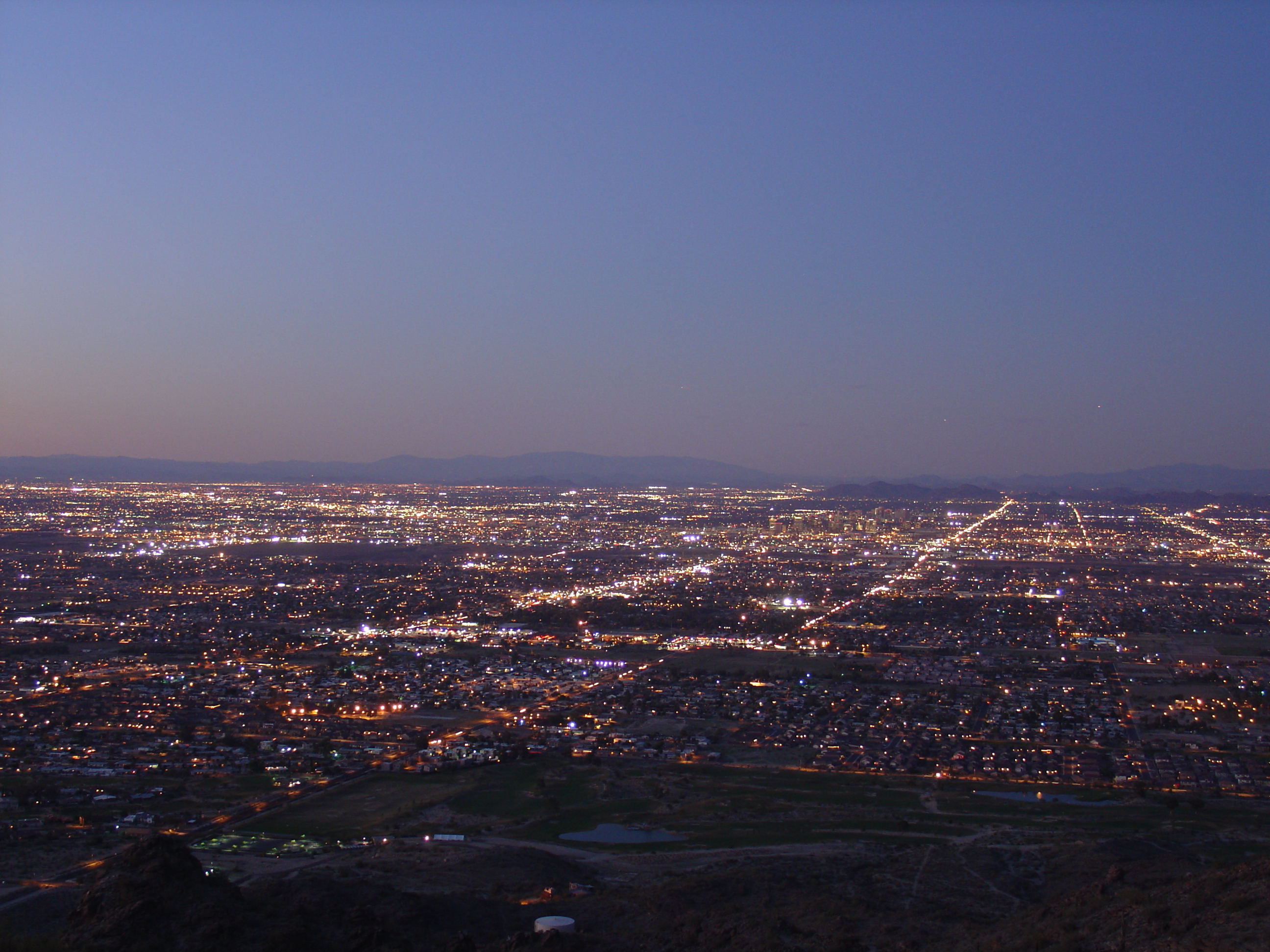
Phoenix from South Mountain at dusk. South Phoenix is in the foreground

South Phoenix is a region of Phoenix, Arizona. By one definition it encompasses an area south of the Salt River, north of Baseline Road, east of 51 Avenue, and west of 48 Street.

== History ==
The first land purchase recorded in South Phoenix occurred near what is today 15th Avenue and Broadway Road, where Noah Matthew Broadway, who was Maricopa County Sheriff from 1885 to 1886, purchased land in 1871 which became the 160-acre (0.65 km^{2}) Broadway Ranch. The land was otherwise unpopulated at the time except for a few Mexican grain farmers who lived south of the Salt River between what are now 24th St. and 48th St.

In May 1873, Prescott merchant Michael Wormser made arrangements to supply the Mexican farmers, and required them to obtain legal title to their land. When they ended up falling into debt, he took possession of their land, acquiring 9,000 acres (36 km^{2}) of land in South Phoenix and Tempe. After Wormser's death on April 25, 1898, most of his real estate holdings were purchased on January 9, 1901, by land and cattle magnate Dwight B. Heard, who also ran The Arizona Republican (now The Arizona Republic) newspaper from 1912 until his death in 1929. This land, which includes most of the northeast part of South Phoenix, became the Bartlett-Heard Ranch, which began being subdivided and sold for homesites on March 20, 1910. Most of the land initially sold from the Ranch was between 7th Avenue and 16th Street, and between Broadway Road and Southern Ave., mostly for small farms, in an area that became known as Roosevelt Place when it was developed into residential homes on one- and 2-acre (8,100 m^{2}) lots in the 1920s.

The construction of railroad tracks south of the Salt River, as well as a number of heavy floodings, including one 1891, meant that Caucasian residents of Phoenix moved north, leaving minority residents in South Phoenix.

During 1912–1913, the Highline and Western canals were built to supply water from the Salt River to the South Mountain area, which led to further agricultural development. In addition to raising cattle, the land was used for raising alfalfa, cotton, oranges and other citrus trees, canaigre (a plant that produces tannin used for tanning leather), and even Louis Janssens' Belgian-American Ostrich Farm, which operated on 230 acres (0.93 km^{2}) of Bartlett-Heard subdivided land until World War I. (Two other families, the Petersons and Pickrells, also operated ostrich farms in South Phoenix; all of these ostrich farms were between 16th St. and 40th St., south of Southern Ave.)

In 1928, Kajuio Kishiyama settled in the South Mountain area to farm vegetables on land which he leased. Kishiyama leased his land because he was prohibited from owning land under the Arizona Alien Land Law of 1921 (overturned as unconstitutional by the Arizona Supreme Court in 1935) which prohibited "Orientals" from owning land in Arizona. Kishiyama successfully experimented with growing flowers near the Western Canal at 40th St. and Baseline Road, and another Japanese family, the Nakagawas, arrived in the area in the 1930s. These families were relocated to internment camps during World War II, of which there were two in Arizona, the Gila River War Relocation Center and the Poston War Relocation Center. After the war was over, the Kishiyama and Nakagawa families returned to the South Mountain area and started over, again successfully raising large fields of flowers, lettuce, and other vegetables along the Baseline corridor.

There are numerous sites of historic and natural interest within the boundaries of South Phoenix, including Mystery Castle, Heard Scout Pueblo, the San Francisco Xavier Mission built in 1940 by Francisco Vasquez (open to public Saturday and Sunday, 08:00 am to 5:00 pm), The Farm at South Mountain, South Mountain Park, and several historic buildings at the entrance of the park called "Scorpion Gulch".

== Geography ==
There are differing definitions on what constitutes South Phoenix.

Phoenix Police Department defines South Phoenix in a police precinct that also includes Ahwatukee. Ahwatukee, which is an urban village of the City of Phoenix, is normally considered to be part of the East Valley region of the Phoenix metropolitan area.

First Things First, a publicly funded organization dedicated to early childhood education, defines South Phoenix as a region that encompasses an area west of 48th Street, east of 27th Avenue, South of the Salt River, and north of South Mountain, omitting Ahwatukee.

== Demographics ==
Some researchers have noted that racial attitudes in Phoenix during the 19th century have shaped the development of South Phoenix, with a railroad line in Phoenix being the demarcating boundary between the White part of the city, and South Phoenix. A journal article that details a history of environmental racism in Phoenix states that by the 1890s, segregation and unregulated land uses in minority districts had already begun shaping environmental and social and conditions in the area.

In the decades prior to the 1970s, South Phoenix was the only part of the city in which homes were sold to African American and Mexican American residents, due to restrictive covenants in place on housing in other parts of the city.

Since the late 1990s (and especially since 2002), the area has undergone rapid development, especially along the Baseline Corridor, where acres of citrus groves and flower fields have been turned into housing developments and commercial properties. With its close proximity to downtown Phoenix, the housing market in South Phoenix continues to thrive.

Though much of the area has become predominantly Latino, the areas closer to downtown and Tempe remain predominantly African-American. Census tract 1160, between Broadway and Baseline, has a population of 4,711 and was 56.3% African-American, the highest percentage in the entire state of Arizona. Other traditionally black neighborhoods include Hermoso Park, Okemah, South Vistas, Lindo Park and the Park South neighborhood. Hispanics are now the majority in South Phoenix.

== Business ==
The headquarters for the Apollo Group, parent company of University of Phoenix and Western International University and corporate offices for SuperShuttle Int. are located in the South Mountain Village area. The headquarters for Ace Asphalt are also located here.

== Media ==
The South Mountain Village is served by the community newspaper South Mountain District News, which also covers news from Laveen which is west of South Mountain Village. The South Mountain District News is a free monthly publication.

The South Mountain Villager also covers the area with a format that includes only printing positive stories about the area.

== Crime ==
South Phoenix has similar crime rates to other areas of Phoenix. Uniform crime rate reports from the Phoenix Police Department show property crime rates at or below those in other parts of Phoenix. Violent crime rates are also similar with most of the activity concentrated between Southern and Broadway.
