= Del Monte Market =

Historic market in Phoenix, Arizona

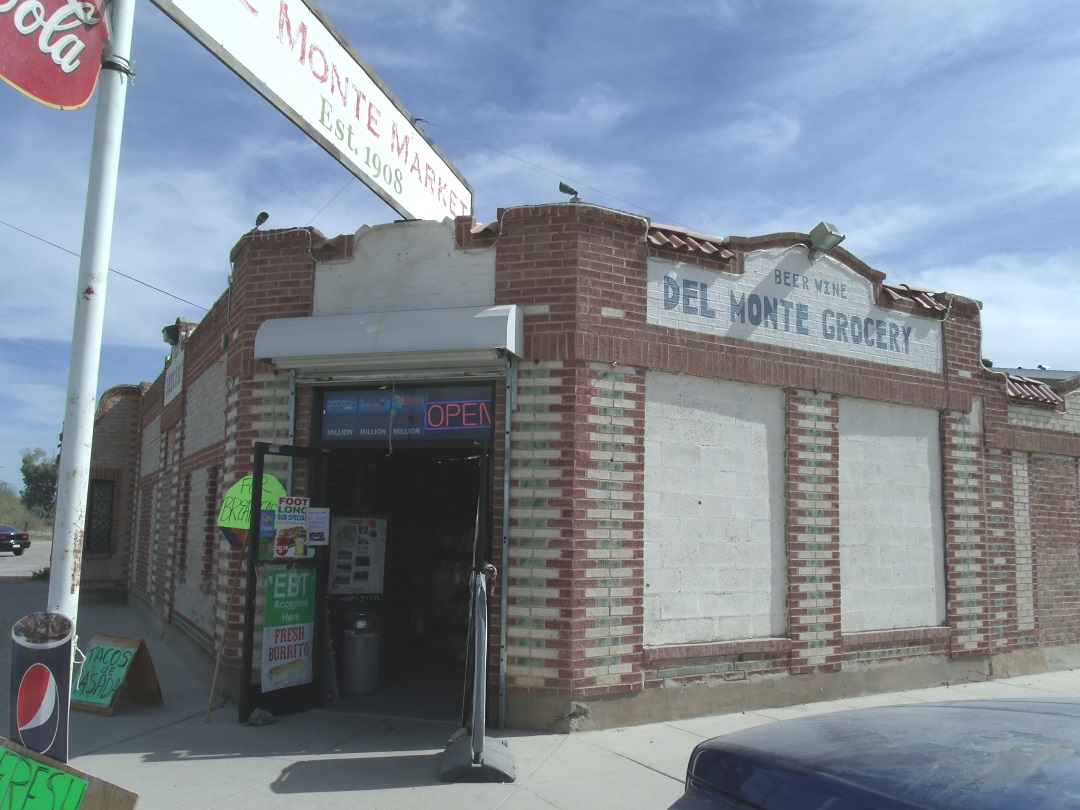
- Del Monte Market
- Interactive map of the Del Monte Market area

General information
- Location: South Phoenix
- Coordinates: 33.363022°N 112.117509°W
- Completed: 1908

Technical details
- Floor area: 4,100 sq ft

Del Monte Market is an historic market located on the western edge of South Phoenix, Arizona. It is listed on the Phoenix Historic Registry as "the oldest continually operating general market in the state."
