= Laveen, Phoenix =

Unincorporated community in the state of Arizona, United States

Laveen
- Urban village
- Laveen Village
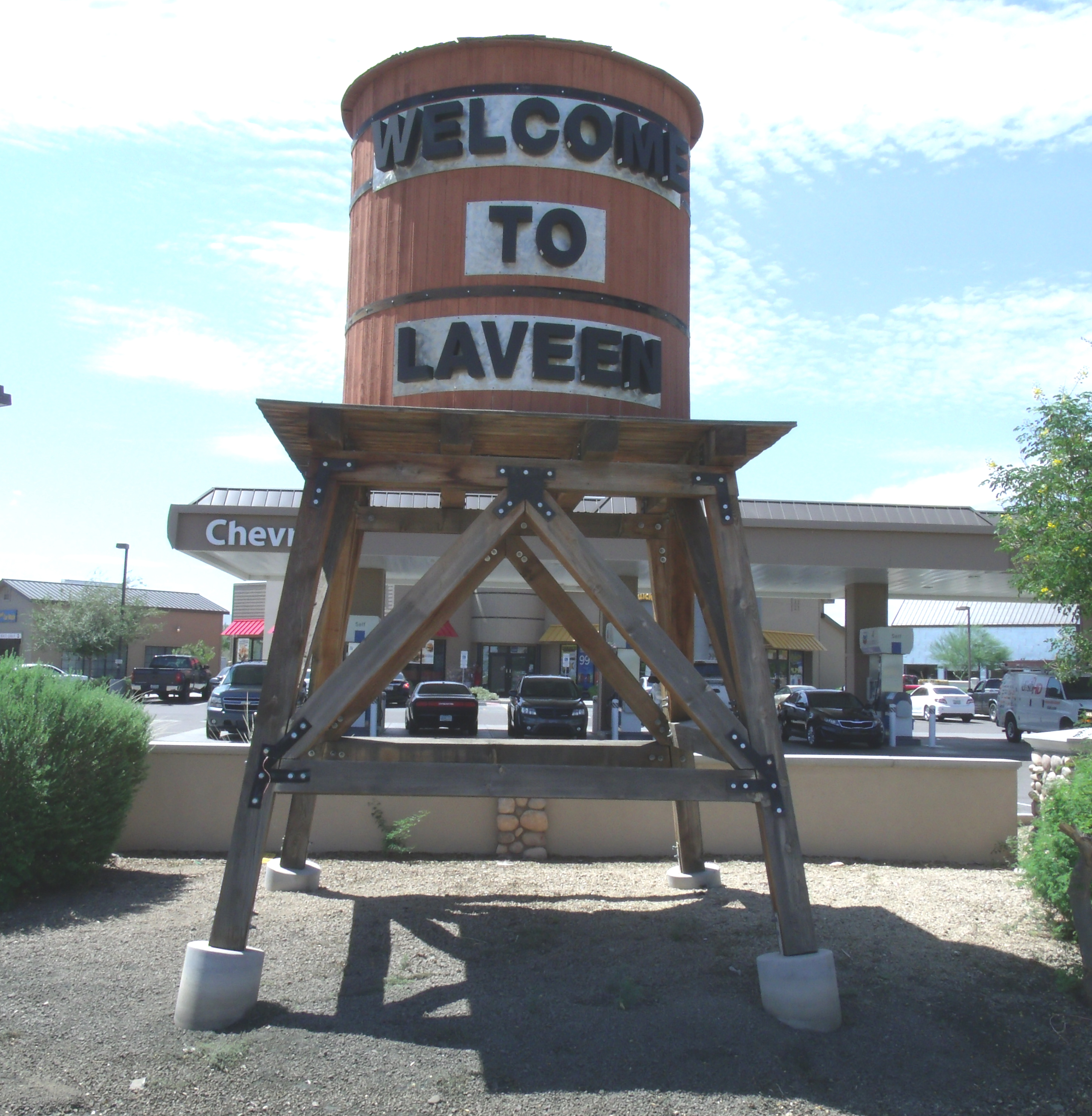
- The Laveen Village welcoming water tower
- Motto: “Where rural is a way of life.”
- Location of Laveen highlighted in red
- Country: United States
- State: Arizona
- County: Maricopa
- City: Phoenix
- Website: Laveen Village Planning Committee

Laveen, Arizona
- Former CDP
- Location of Laveen in Maricopa County, Arizona.
- Coordinates: 33°22′39.14″N 112°10′5.81″W
- Country: United States
- State: Arizona
- County: Maricopa

Area
  - Total: 48.0 sq mi (124.3 km^{2})
- Elevation: 1,033 ft (315 m)

Population (2000)
  - Total: 48,021
  - Density: 124/sq mi (47.7/km^{2})
- Time zone: UTC-7 (Mountain (MST))
- ZIP codes: 85339 and 85041
- Area codes: 602, 623
- GNIS feature ID: 6920

Laveen (/ləˈviːn/ lə-VEEN) is a community in Maricopa County, Arizona, United States, situated eight miles (13 km) southwest of Downtown Phoenix, between South Mountain and the confluence of the Gila and Salt rivers. Parts of Laveen constitute an unincorporated community in Maricopa County, while the remainder falls within the city limits of Phoenix, constituting the city's "Laveen Village" an urban village. Laveen Village is split between District 7 and District 8, both notable as minority-majority districts for the city. Although Laveen has been home to "pastoral alfalfa, cotton, and dairy farms" since the 1880s, housing and commercial developments have been increasingly urbanizing the area.

== History ==
The Laveen area was first settled by farmers and dairymen in 1884. Despite its proximity to Phoenix, the community was isolated from its larger neighbor by the Salt River, which carried water year-round until the Roosevelt Dam was completed in 1911. The only bridged crossing was at Central Avenue, more than six miles (9.7 km) away. Because of its isolation, like the rest of south Phoenix, early Laveen was autonomous of Phoenix, and became relatively self-sufficient, supporting two general stores, a barbershop, repair garage, two pool halls, and a building for the Laveen Women's Club. These businesses served as important gathering places for the greater Laveen community, which includes modern south Phoenix, and the neighboring Gila River Indian Community (GRIC).

=== Walter Laveen ===
Born on July 25, 1889, in Graceville, Big Stone county, Minnesota to Swedish immigrants, Andrew and Anna (Née Edlund) Laveen. In the early 1900s, Walter Emanuel Laveen Sr. and his family homesteaded an area encompassing all four corners of present-day 51st Avenue and Dobbins Road, where they also built the area's first general store on the southeast corner. Members of the Laveen family donated land adjacent to their store for a school built in 1913, and named "Laveen School." A second general store, the Del Monte Market, was built in 1908 at 27th Avenue and Dobbins Road, and is considered the oldest still-standing building in Laveen.

In 1915, the U.S. Bureau of Reclamation noted the community was called Laveen and had a population of less than 25. In March 1918, Walter Laveen was appointed the area's first postmaster, and operated the post office in the back of his store. Laveen later served as Sheriff in Pinal County.

On February 7, 1946, Walter Laveen died in Case Grande, Pinal County, Arizona due to injuries sustained in an automobile accident two days prior. He was interred the same day at Greenwood Memory Lawn Cemetery.

=== Dee Cheatham ===
Armon Deconda "Dee" Cheatham Sr. succeeded Walter Laveen as postmaster, and served in the post for the next 30 years. Cheatham and his wife, Lula Ann, were from Duncan, Arizona, where they had owned a dairy. In 1919, the Cheathams sold their dairy, and moved to Laveen along with Cheatham's brother, Shelton Conroy Cheatham.

Dee and Shelton bought the general store from the Laveens, along with 40 acres (160,000 m^{2}) of farmland on the southeast corner of 51st Avenue and Dobbins Road. They sold the store after running it for a few years, and used the proceeds to set up separate farms. Shelton's farm was on the original 40 acres (160,000 m^{2}), while Dee and Lula moved south to 51st Avenue and Elliott Road, where they set up not only a new farm, but also a dairy.

“Come to Laveen and smell our 'Dairy-Air'”

— Laveen Community Council bumper sticker

By 1941, the Cheathams' dairy operation had outgrown their farm, so they bought 360 acres (1.5 km^{2}) of land south of Baseline Road, between 43rd and 51st Avenues. While constructing the dairy, the Cheathams had to clear the site of mesquite and rattlesnakes. Once complete, it was one of the larger dairies in Arizona and used registered Holstein cattle.

The Cheathams grew their own hay on nearby land for the operation, and originally used a large herd of Belgian and Suffolk Punch draft horses to pull the hay mowers, rakes, baler, and wagons. Although tractors eventually took over most of the work, the horses were still used for feeding the dairy herd until the operation was shut down in 2003, and the family sold most of the land to developers.

Dee died on May 23, 1964 and was preceded in death by Shelton, whom died on January 13, 1954. The brothers were interred at Greenwood Memory Lawn Cemetery, where most of the Cheatham family have been interred.

=== Cotton harvest ===
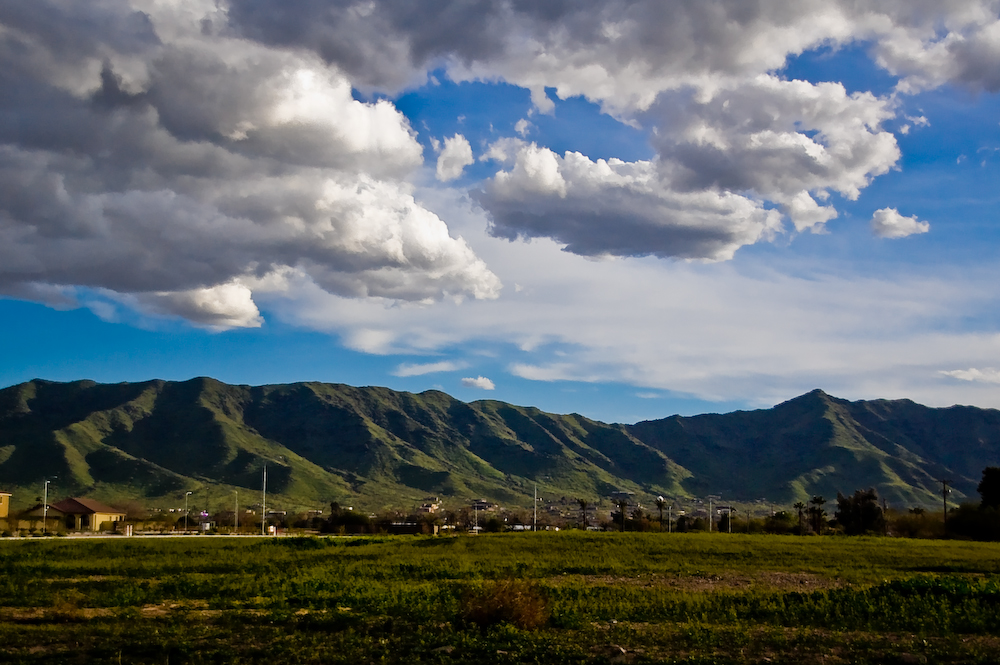
South Mountains above Laveen

Several farmers in Laveen raised (and continue to raise) cotton. In 1916, Andrew Benton Clevenger moved his family from St. George, Utah, onto rented land in Laveen. With the whole family's help, they put in a cotton crop. Other farmers planted cotton as well, and around harvesting time, migrant workers who picked the cotton by hand would arrive, swelling the local population. Most farms provided housing for the workers. The seasonal migrant population has dropped off due to the increased use of farm machinery in harvesting cotton.

=== Well water ===
Laveen School had the area's only deep well, which also supplied the Laveen Store. Water from residents' shallow wells was acceptable for washing and crop cultivation, but too salty for culinary use. Therefore, the community set up a public-use hydrant south of the store, where people, including members of the Maricopa and Pima tribes, came for their drinking water. Tribe members would bring wagon loads of milk cans to fill with water, and firewood to trade for groceries. During the winter, the store would sell excess wood to wood lots in and around Phoenix.

In a landmark water rights ruling involving several Laveen residents, Bristor v. Cheatham, the Arizona Supreme Court ruled on January 12, 1952, that percolating water was not private property. Several residents had sued Dee Cheatham for what they believed was excessive pumping of ground water, causing their wells to run dry. The court cited the principle "Rock stays, water moves." However, on February 26, 1952, the court reversed itself, ruling that ground water should be limited to "reasonable" use, but still fell under the ownership of landowners.

=== Religion ===
Although many of the early settlers were religious, including the Clevengers who were Mormons, through April 1939, various attempts by churches to set up a Sunday School in Laveen had failed. However, that month, members of the Central Baptist Church of Phoenix leased space in the Laveen School Auditorium, and after their "mission" took hold, grew into the Laveen Baptist Church by 1943. That year, the church purchased land for a permanent building on the northeast corner of 51st Avenue and Dobbins Road, across from the school. The church added a parsonage in 1948, and had a full-time pastor by the 1970s. Today, Laveen supports seven churches, and has an Islamic mosque under construction on the site of the old Laveen General Store, named the Islamic Center of Laveen.

=== Laveen Cowbelles ===
The Laveen Cowbelles were women from Laveen ranching and dairy families who worked to promote the beef industry. Their parent group, the Arizona Cowbelles, was formed in Douglas, Arizona, in 1938 to "cement the goodwill and friendship among the wives and mothers of cattle men in Cochise County." They were initially a local service organization, putting together socials and picnics, but eventually expanded their mission to include promoting the industry's beef products. Laveen women formed a chapter in 1947, and the group was organized statewide by 1949. In 1956 alone, the Laveen Cowbelles affixed 138,000 stickers reading "Beef for Father's Day" to envelopes mailed by various banks and businesses, and in 1959, the statewide group had the then-Governor, Paul Fannin, proclaim "Beef for Father's Day." The Cowbelles also gave members the ability to "communicate with one another about their collective identity." Their mascot was "an ample-bosomed, blonde caricature named Lil' Dudette."

=== Annual barbecue ===
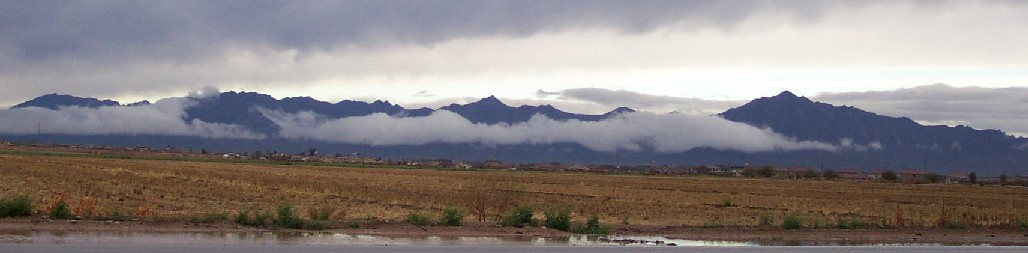
Estrella Mountains from Laveen, January 2004.

In 1950, the Cowbelles organized a barbecue to give the community a chance to gather on the last Sunday of the year, and to raise money for the March of Dimes.

In 1960, the non-profits and churches in Laveen formed the Laveen Community Council (LCC), which took over the barbecue, and began channeling most of the proceeds to pay for lights on the baseball fields at Laveen School, although donations to the March of Dimes continued into the 1970s. By 1984, the barbecue had raised a cumulative $71,000. The date of the event was gradually moved into early February.

In recent years, the barbecue has grown into a very large event held at Corona Ranch, a venue in Laveen with rodeo grounds. The event attracts vendors from all over Arizona, and serves as an opportunity for community members to come together. The barbecue has held tight to its rural roots, and hosts a variety of events, including: a cow milking competition, pot-belly pig racing, country music, and more.

=== Notable historical events ===
- February 4, 1923: Laveen farmer R.F. Payton used an ax to murder his wife and 9-year-old daughter, and seriously injured his 5-year-old son. Payton then took his own life.
- January 14, 1930: The "Toledo Family Bandits," two men and a woman whose recent criminal activity involved gunning down a Pennsylvania state trooper and a Maricopa County sheriff, as well as kidnapping a Florence, Arizona, deputy sheriff, were captured alive by a posse in the Estrella Mountains above Laveen after a "sharp gun fight." Walter E. Laveen, by then serving as Pinal County Sheriff, "enlisted almost every able-bodied man" in the area to capture the trio, which had been the subject of a nationwide manhunt. After their capture, the woman, Irene Schroeder, became the first woman executed by electrocution in Pennsylvania, and the fourth woman electrocuted in the United States.
- July 3, 1983: Miami Dolphins linebacker, Larry Gordon, collapsed while jogging in Laveen during his off-season training program. He died about an hour later at a Phoenix hospital.
- December 25, 1998: A fire destroyed the Laveen home of former Philadelphia Eagles linebacker Byron Evans. Evans and his family made it out safely.
- June 2002: The City of Phoenix took over the Laveen Fire Department, a step in the slow annexation of Laveen by the city.
- May 25, 2003: A developer clearing land for a housing development razed two stone silos standing near the northeast corner of 43rd Avenue and Dobbins Road. The silos dated from around 1900, and were visible landmarks throughout Laveen. They were torn down "at four in the morning on a weekend when everybody was sleeping." A Richmond-American Homes subdivision was later built on the land.
- 2006: Former NFL running back, Emmitt Smith, spearheaded a large, 25-acre (100,000 m^{2}) retail development at the intersection of 35th Avenue and Southern, which has sat mostly empty since Mervyn's closed its doors several years ago.
- April 3, 2012: Laveen made national headlines when Daniel Adkins was shot while walking his dog past a Taco Bell at night. This case added to the Trayvon Martin controversy unfolding at the same time in Florida. Both were cases of concern about murder versus self-defense.

=== Other ===
World War II Alamo Scout (US 6th Army Special Reconnaissance Unit) Joshua Sunn was born and raised in Laveen. The endangered Maricopa language is spoken by fewer than 100 members of the Maricopa (or Piipaash) tribe, most of whom live at the Maricopa Colony near Laveen.

== Community ==
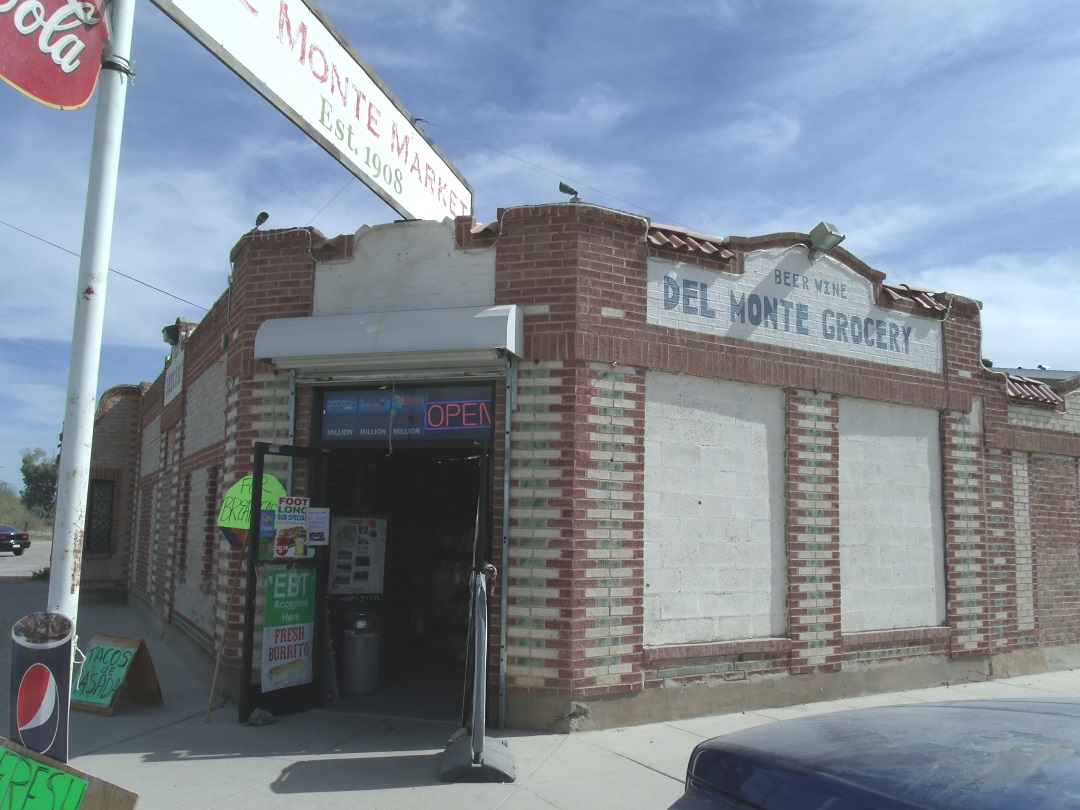
The Del Monte Market built in 1908 and located at 2659 W. Dobbins Road. It is the oldest continuously operating market in the state. Designated as a landmark with Historic Preservation-Landmark (HP-L) overlay zoning (Phoenix Historic Property Register).

Laveen became less isolated as bridges were built across the Salt River. The store, barber shop, and one of the pool houses burned down. Roger Laveen, later elected Maricopa County Recorder, tore down the other pool hall. The Laveen Women's Club donated its building to the community, which moved it west of Laveen School. The LCC restored the building – now called "Building A" – using barbecue proceeds as well as federal funds. Although some dairies and farms have sold out to residential and commercial developers, some remain, contributing to the continued rural feel of the area.

“As development pressures increase throughout the valley and city leaders continue to focus on infill of properties near central Phoenix, the area's proximity to downtown and access to the future South Mountain Loop will bring these pressures to bear on Laveen. The area contains approximately 28 square miles (73 km^{2}) of largely undeveloped and agricultural property within a ten- or twenty-minute commute of the Interstate 10 corridor and downtown.”

— Laveen Planning Commission

=== Urban development ===
In 2000, a commercial home builder broke ground on "Arlington Estates," a large residential development in what, at the time, was rural Laveen. Since that time, the community has experienced explosive residential growth. That growth has been tempered, however, by community activist groups, such as the LCC and two newer groups, "Laveen Citizens for Responsible Development" (LCRD), and "South Laveen Against High Density" (SLAHD). These groups put pressure on developers to include equestrian trails, open spaces, and other bucolic and rural elements in new developments. For example, when Walmart opened its Laveen location in 2007, it looked “a little different than most other Walmart. The face of the building has more of a rural design, and there is more dense and mature landscaping than other Walmart stores.”

Although official zoning recommendations for the area of Laveen falling within the city of Phoenix come from the Laveen Planning Commission (LPC), the Phoenix City Council has historically taken the recommendations of both the commission and the LCRD into consideration when voting on zoning matters. Zoning in both the county and city areas of Laveen is guided by a master plan called the "Southwest Regional Growth Study."

In the 1980s, the Arizona Department of Transportation (ADOT) proposed building part of the 202 Freeway through Laveen. ADOT later shelved its plans due to funding problems. However, the freeway construction eventually began, and the extension, passing through most of Laveen at about 59th Avenue, officially opened on December 21, 2019. As a result, there are plans for a new Laveen hospital, regional retail centers, and potential Spring Training expansion in 2011–2012. A new retail development, called Laveen Park Place, opened around the time of the freeway opening.

=== Golf courses ===
Laveen supports two golf courses: the former Bougainvillea Golf Club (formerly private), which became a public course under new management in October 2012, and now known as Southern Ridge Golf Club; and the Aguila Golf Course (public), 18-hole pro golf course featuring 3 lakes that is owned by the city of Phoenix. Southern Ridge, located at 59th Avenue and Baseline Road, was an 18-hole, par-72 course with six par 5's, 4's, and 3's, as well as a driving range. Aguila is an 18-hole public course located at 35th Avenue and Dobbins Road. In addition to its main course, Aguila has a 9-hole par-3 executive course as well.

== Education ==
The community is served by the Laveen Elementary School District and Roosevelt Elementary School District (for both elementary and middle school students), and the Phoenix Union High School District. In addition to the original Laveen School, now a K–8 school named Laveen Elementary, the community supports seven other K–8 schools: Bernard Black, Cheatham Elementary, Desert Meadows, M.C. Cash Elementary, Rogers Ranch, Trailside Point, and Vista del Sur (a traditional school that was named the #1 elementary school in the state of Arizona in 2012 by the Arizona Department of Education). Rogers Ranch Elementary, the seventh school in the district with a curriculum focused on Science, Technology, Engineering, and Math ("STEM"), opened in August 2012. There are two charter schools in Laveen, and a private school in nearby Maricopa Village. Laveen has two high schools (Betty H. Fairfax High School and César Chávez High School), and South Mountain Community College plans to build a campus at 59th Avenue and Vineyard Road. Heritage Academy Laveen, a 6–12 grade tuition-free charter school, opened in Laveen around August 2014. The K–8 tribal school Gila Crossing Community School, affiliated with the Bureau of Indian Education, is in Komatke, with a Laveen address.

== Governmental representation ==
Laveen is in Arizona's 3rd Congressional District, and is served by Representative Yassamin Ansari, a Democrat. Laveen is also represented by Phoenix City Council's 7th district, and Arizona Legislative district 27.

== Geography ==
Laveen is located near the confluence of the Salt and Gila Rivers, southwest of downtown Phoenix. The area of Laveen contains approximately 48 square miles (120 km^{2}) of largely undeveloped, agricultural property, as well as several groups of residential housing developments. It is bounded on the north by the Salt River, on the south by South Mountain Park, on the west by the Gila River Indian Community, and on the east by 27th Avenue. After several annexations from the mid-1990s to the present, a large portion of the community lies within the city limits of Phoenix, and is designated by the city as Laveen Village (an urban village).

== Climate ==
Laveen is located entirely within the Sonoran Desert, an arid climate. High temperatures in the summer season can average over 105 degrees Fahrenheit. The daily high temperature ranges from over 115 °F (46 °C) during the hottest days of summer, to about 65 °F (18 °C) in winter.

There are two wet seasons: first in spring, and then in late summer, when sometimes-powerful monsoon thunderstorms roar through the area. Occasionally, a winter storm will leave snow on the nearby Estrella Mountains, which occurred between March 11–12, 2006 and on March 2, 2023.

== Gallery ==
Historic buildings in Laveen
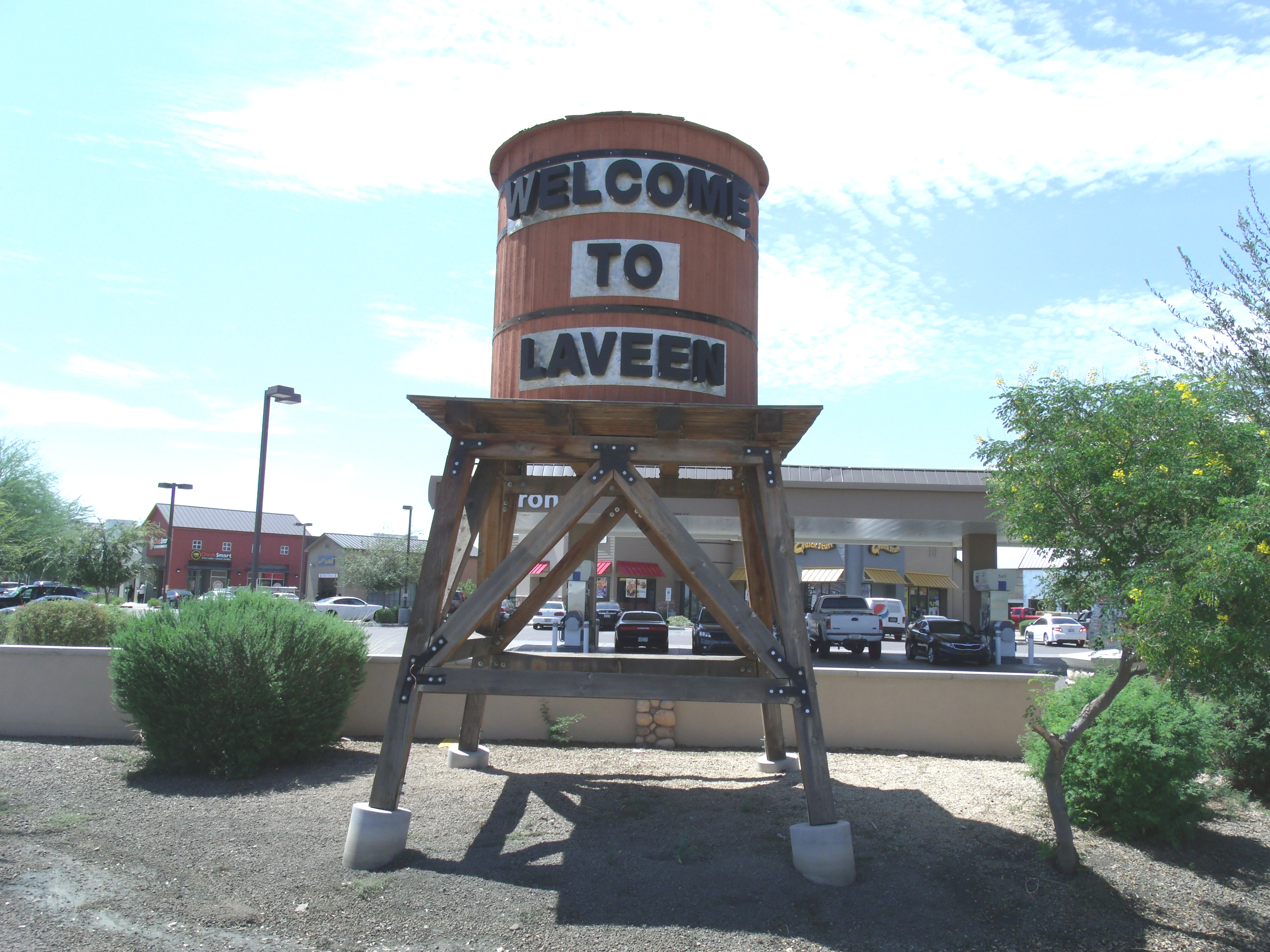
Different view of the Laveen Village Welcoming Water Tower.

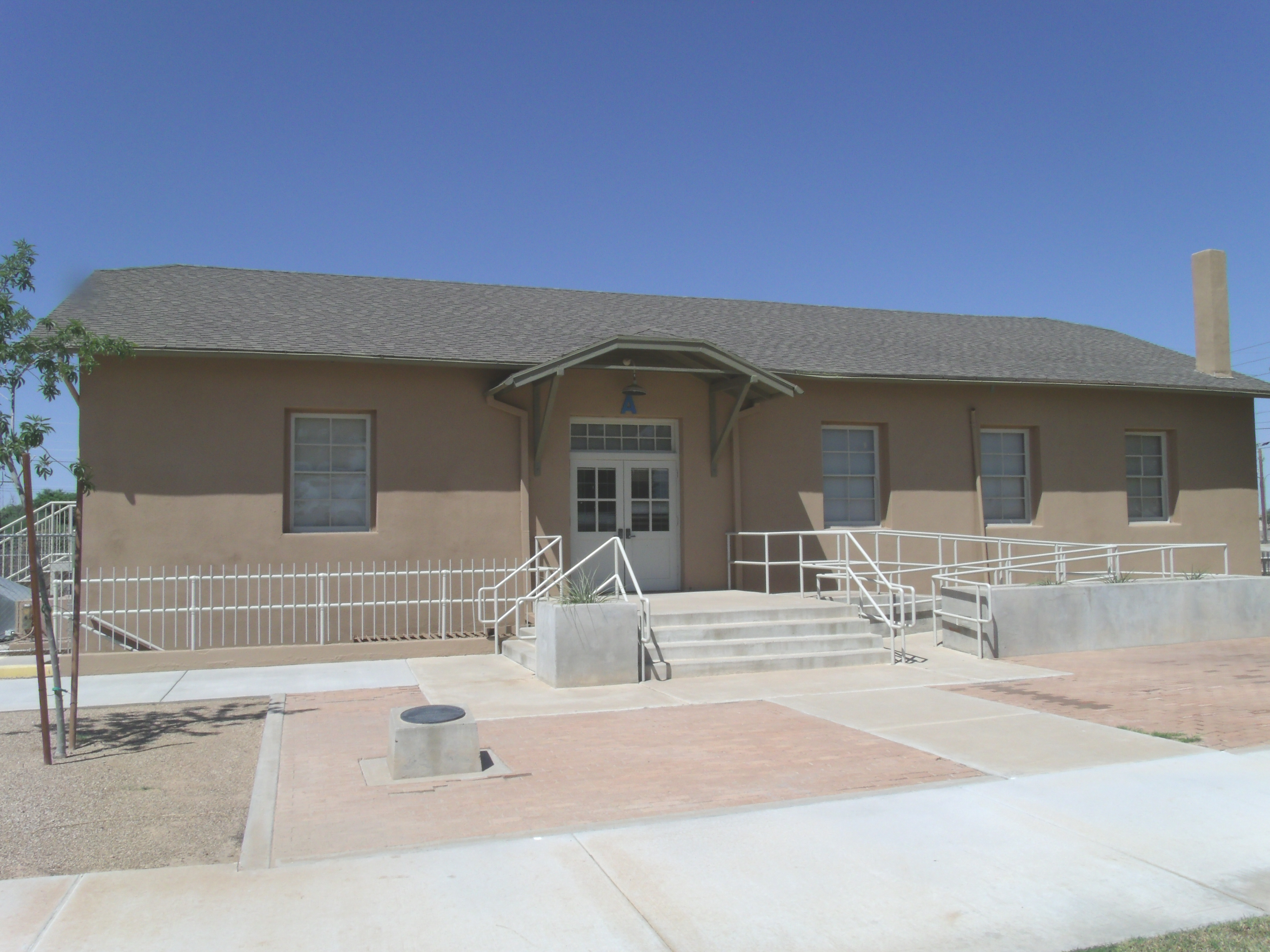
The Laveen School Auditorium listed in the National Register of Historic Places, reference #88001601.

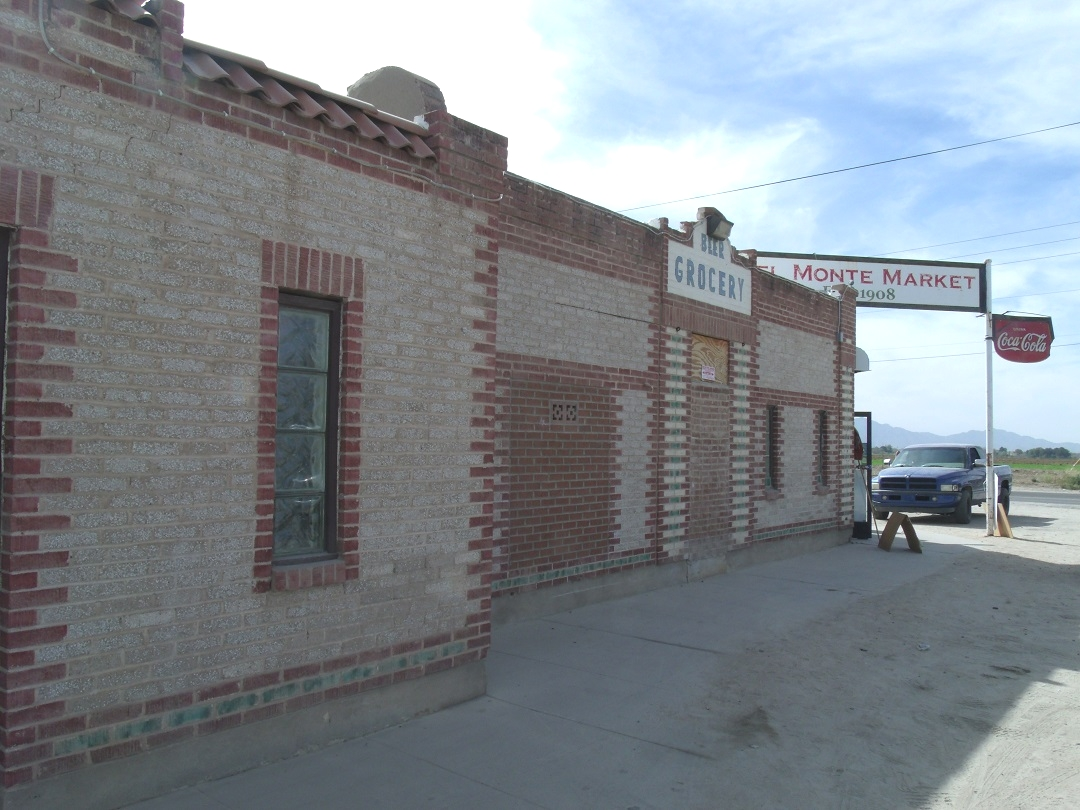
Different view of Del Monte Market.

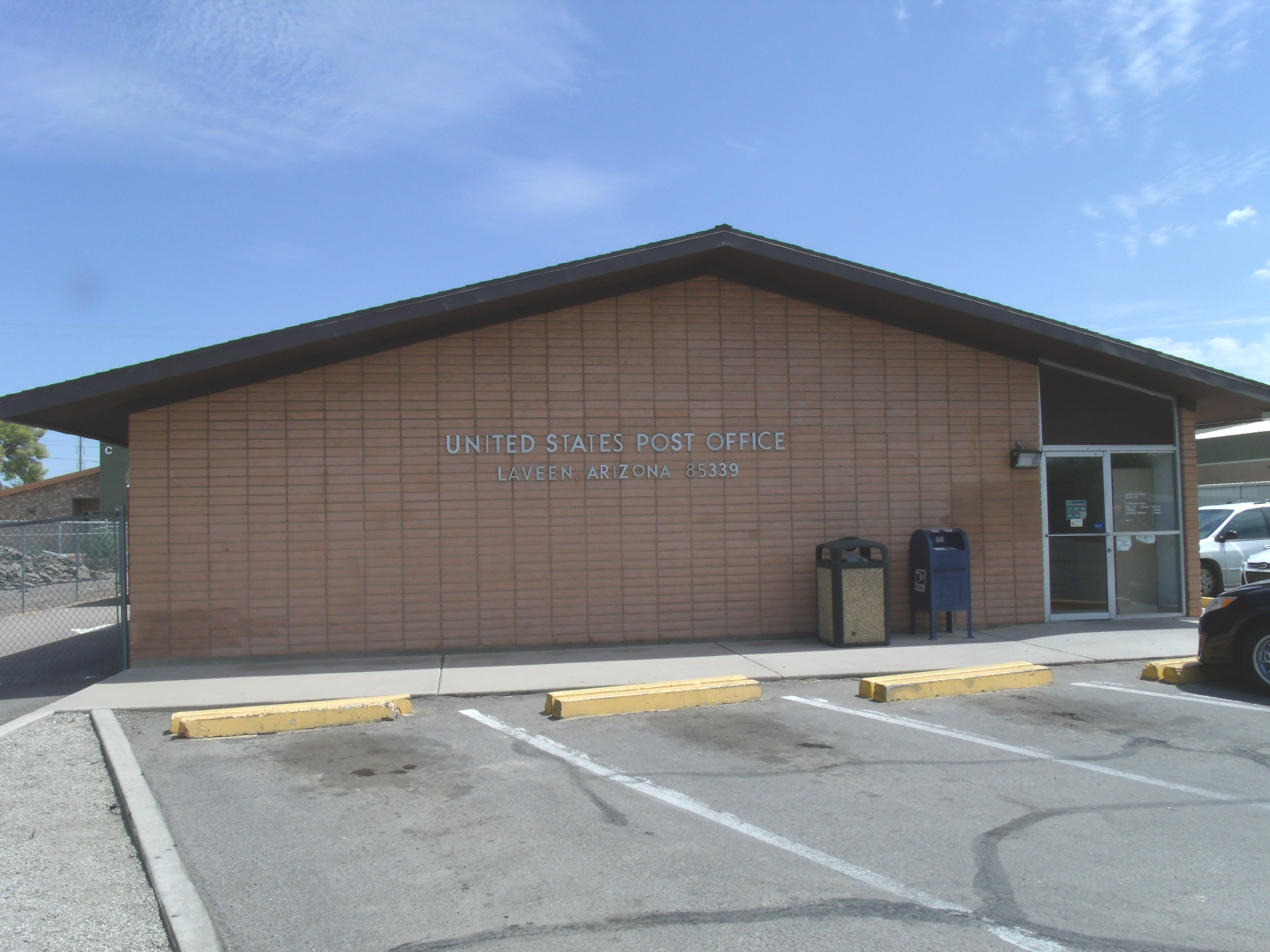
The Laveen Post Office located in the corner of 51st Ave and Dobbins Rd. This is the located where the original Laveen Village post office was established in 1918.

== See also ==
- Gila River Indian Community
- Akimel O'odham (Pima)
- Pee-Posh (Maricopa)
