= Laveen School Auditorium =

- U.S. National Register of Historic Places
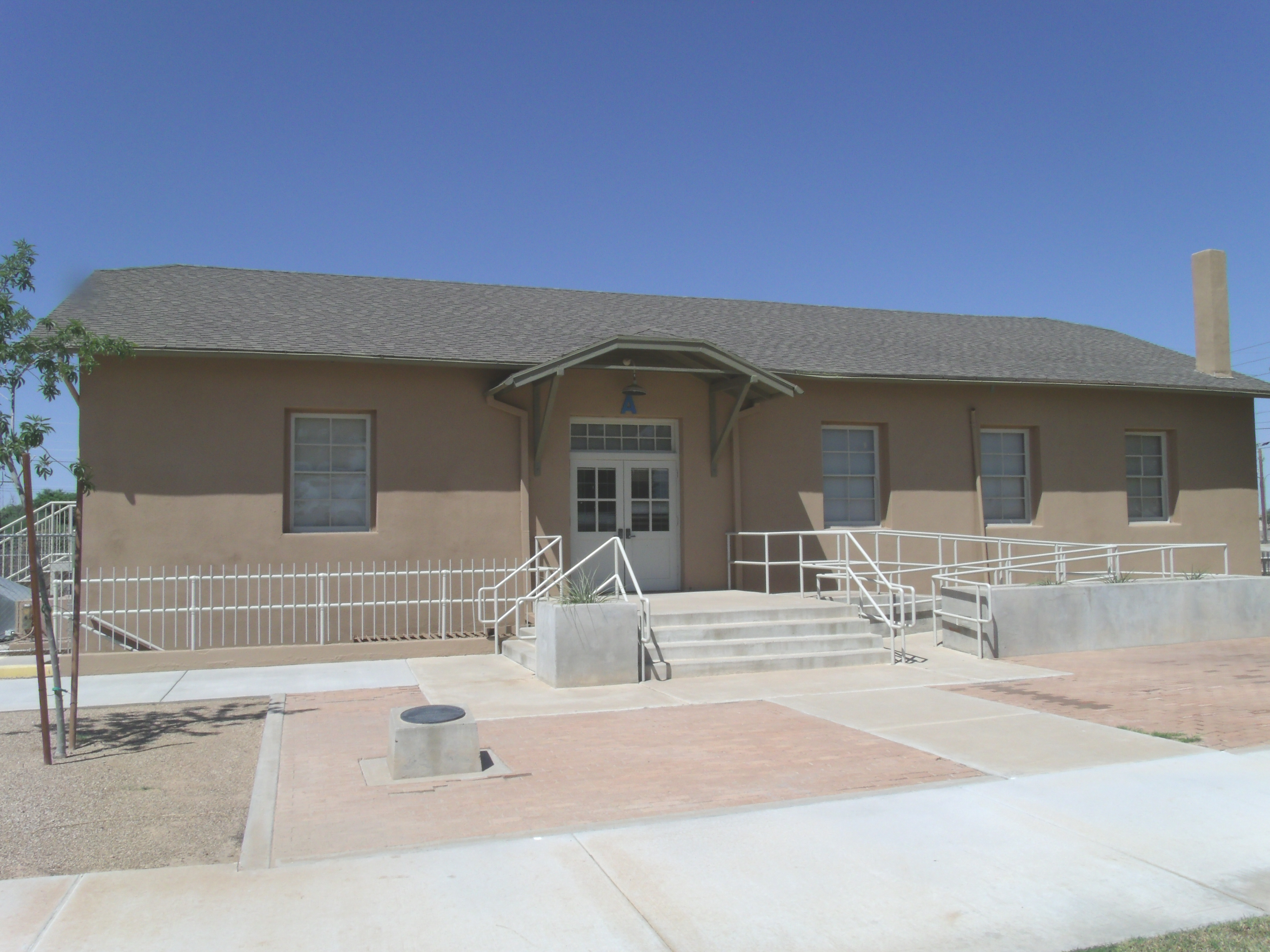
- Laveen School Auditorium

- Location within Arizona Location within the United States
- Location: 5001 W. Dobbins Rd, Laveen, Arizona
- Coordinates: 33°21′45″N 112°10′05″W
- Area: less than one acre
- Built: 1925 or 1940
- Built by: Works Progress Administration
- Architectural style: Late 19th and Early 20th Century American Movements
- NRHP reference No.: 96000040
- Added to NRHP: February 16, 1996

Laveen School Auditorium is a historic structure located in Laveen, Arizona. It was constructed in 1940 and placed on the National Register of Historic Places in 1996.

It is a one-story adobe building with a full basement, with some elements of American Craftsman style in its dormers, gable outriggers, bargeboards, and Spanish roof tile. It has also been known as Building A, Laveen School.

== Gallery ==
Historic Laveen School Auditorium
(NRHP = National Register of Historic Places)
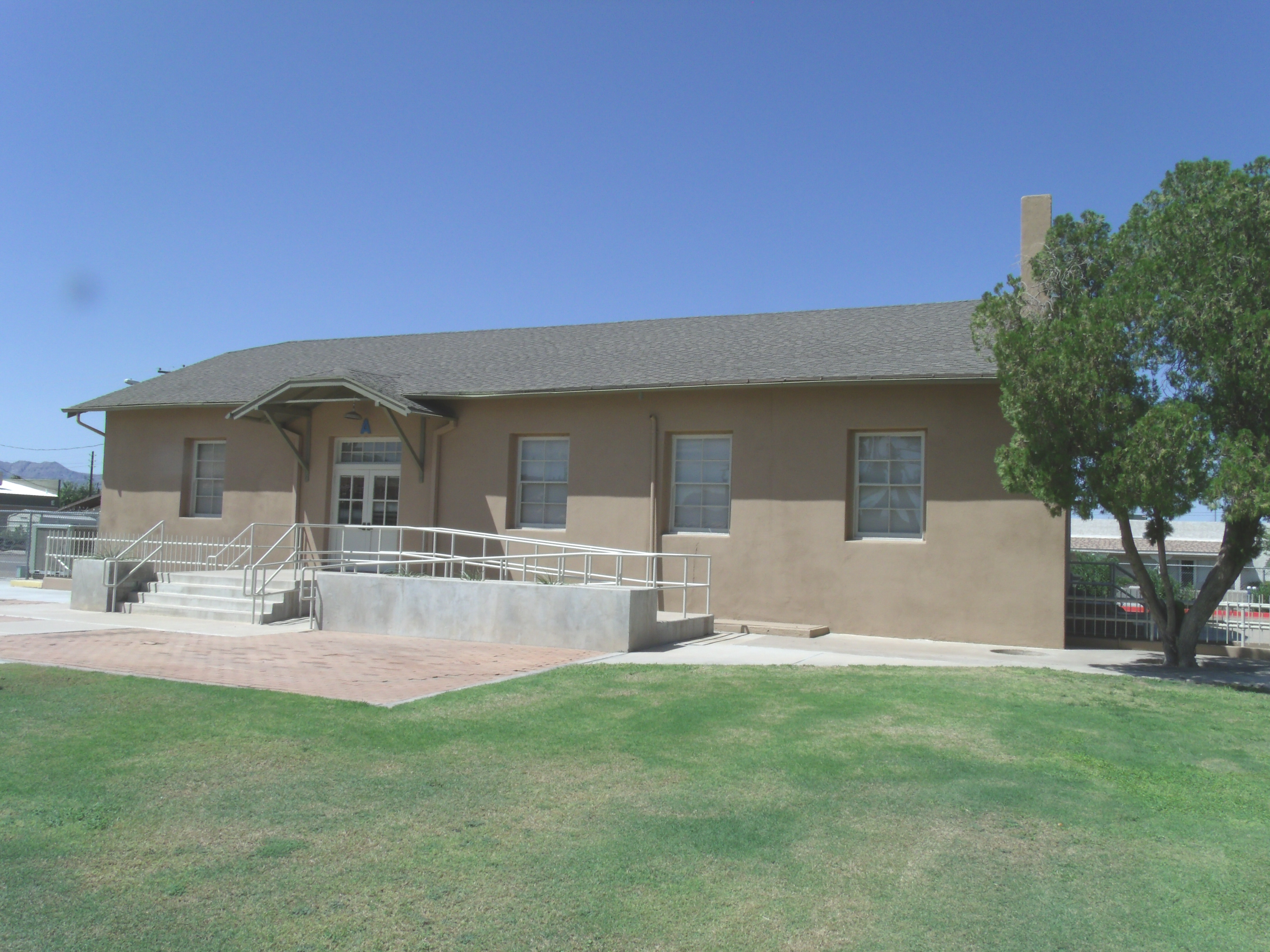
Laveen School Auditorium

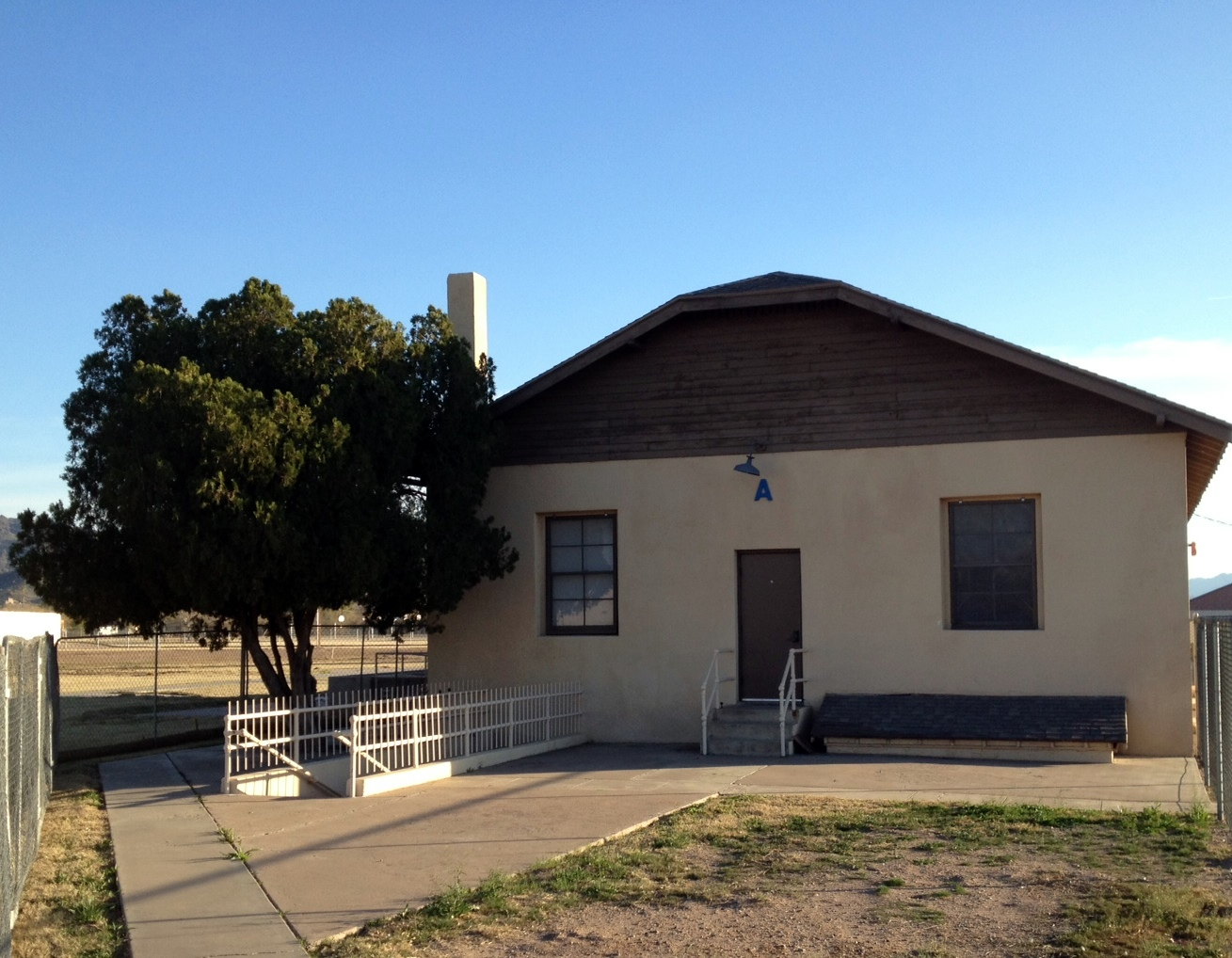
Front of building

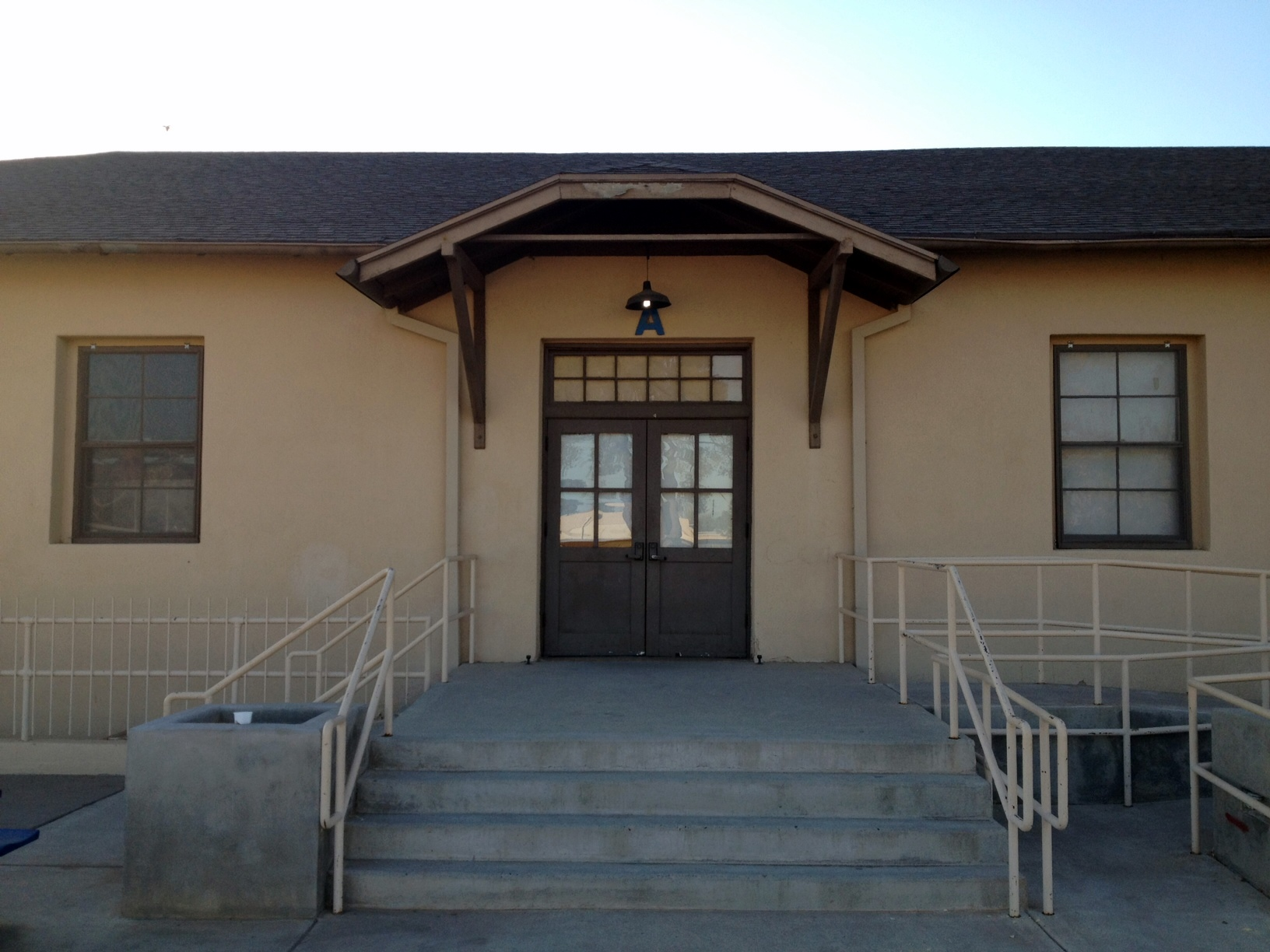
East entrance

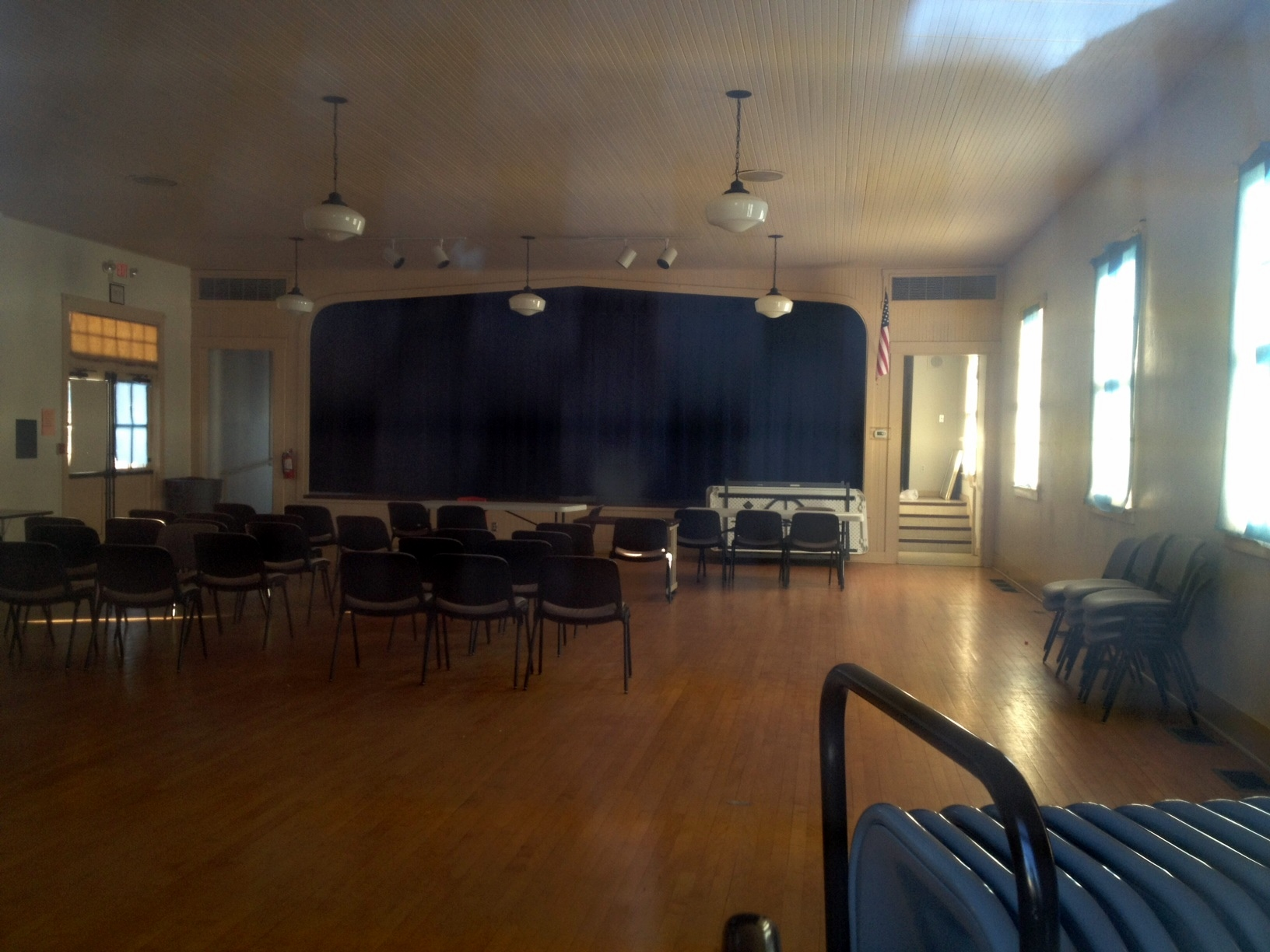
Auditorium interior

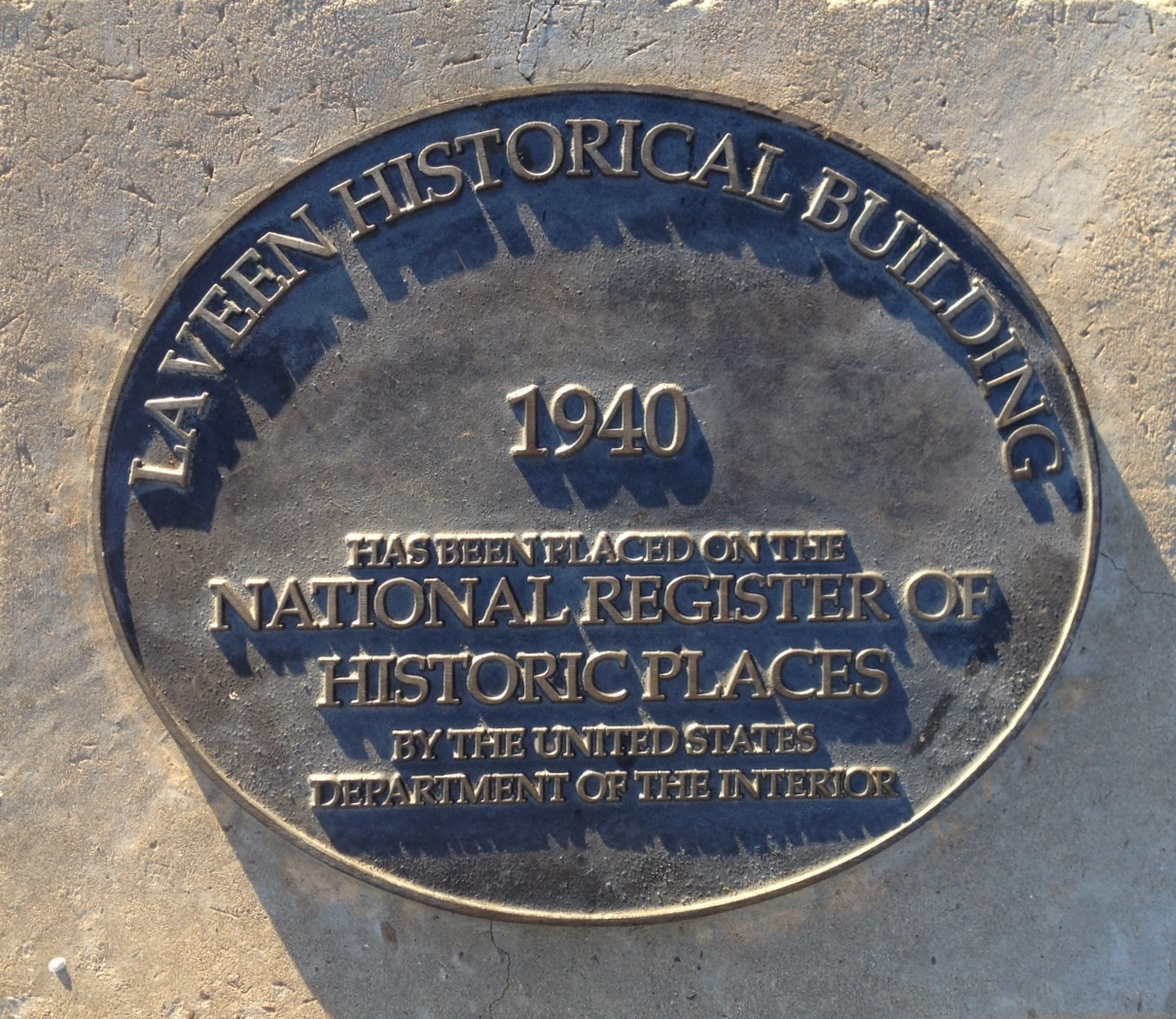
Historical marker
