= Okemah, Phoenix =

Former neighborhood in what is now Phoenix, Arizona

Okemah
- Neighborhood
- Location in Arizona
- Coordinates: 33°25′0.245″N 112°0′1.731″W
- Country: United States
- State: Arizona
- City: Phoenix
- Established: 1927
- Named for: Okemah, Oklahoma

Area
  - Total: 2.7 sq mi (7.1 km^{2})
- Elevation: 1,122 ft (342 m)
- Website: https://okemahcommunity.com/

Okemah (Oh-Kee-Mah) was a neighborhood founded in 1927 by black migrants, now a part of present day Phoenix, Arizona. Most of the original residents moved from Oklahoma (especially Okemah) and Texas, looking for work on farms in the area. The neighborhood was one of the few areas, due to segregation and redlining, that black families could buy land and build homes in the Phoenix area.

== History ==
The land where Okemah would be built was originally a part of the Bartlett-Heard Ranch, owned by Adolphus C. Bartlett and Dwight B. Heard. In 1910 the Colored American Realty Company began recruiting people to grow cotton and raise hogs, poultry, and dairy stocks on Bartlett-Heard Ranch. These recruited workers marked some of the area's first residents who were given some of the ranch's land to live on. In 1927, the Marshall Mortgage Company transformed this area by subdividing the land and selling smaller plots for residential use, allowing more construction of homes and more residents to move in.

The Okemah community was built between 32nd Street and 48th Street (State Route 143), and from Broadway Road to the South and the Salt River to the North.

Many of the residents migrated from Okemah and Boley, Oklahoma. This new community, like the Oklahoma town before it, was named for the Native American chief, Okemah, from the Kickapoo Tribe.

During the Great Depression in the 1930s, the Works Progress Administration began provided training opportunities for Okemah residents.

In the 1940s, Okemah began to receive public utilities such as electricity and water. Public services from the city of Phoenix, such as transportation, arrived later that decade. Residents recall feeling more connected to education, more shops, better jobs, and other communities.

Throughout the 1950s and early 60s, more of Phoenix's black residents continued to move to Okemah due to being displaced elsewhere. Amid President Dwight Eisenhower's Highway Act and the Phoenix area's population growth, the city began new large scale construction projects. Two such projects, the Durango Curve extension of Interstate 17 and expansion of Phoenix Civic Plaza, displaced a sizable number of black residents from other communities. As these people were forced out of their homes, many sought out similar communities to those they left.

In the mid 1960s, the Okemah community began face similar challenges to other black neighborhoods. Earlier in the decade, Phoenix annexed the area and soon after announced plans to build an extension of Interstate 10 through the community. Homes were bought through eminent domain, several homes and businesses were demolished and families were forced to move elsewhere. Even residents who were not in the path of the freeway began to move as more industrial businesses began to move into the area, seeing the decline of the community. Interstate 10's Broadway Curve opened in 1971 and bisected the community. At the same time Okemah's park was turned into a landfill and children from the area began being sent to a variety schools, further disconnecting the community.

In the decades that followed, more industrial businesses continued to move into and expand in the area due to its proximity to the airport. Further highway construction also perpetuated with Arizona State Route 143 opening in 1991 along the eastern edge of the community on 48th Street. In 2000, the last of the few remaining residents finally moved out of their homes in Okemah.

== Legacy ==
While little remains of the original community today, some buildings still remain, such as the former Willow Grove Baptist church. Some references to Okemah can also still be found such as on the sign for the Okemah Service Center.

Since 2001, former residents and their descendants have launched a campaign to remember the community, as well as its history and culture. In 2018, both the state of Arizona and the city of Phoenix, recognized the former neighborhood and its historical significance to the state and city.

In February 2024, the community received the spotlight when Arizona State University hosted a biographical mixed media presentation showing photos and video interviews of former residents about Okemah.

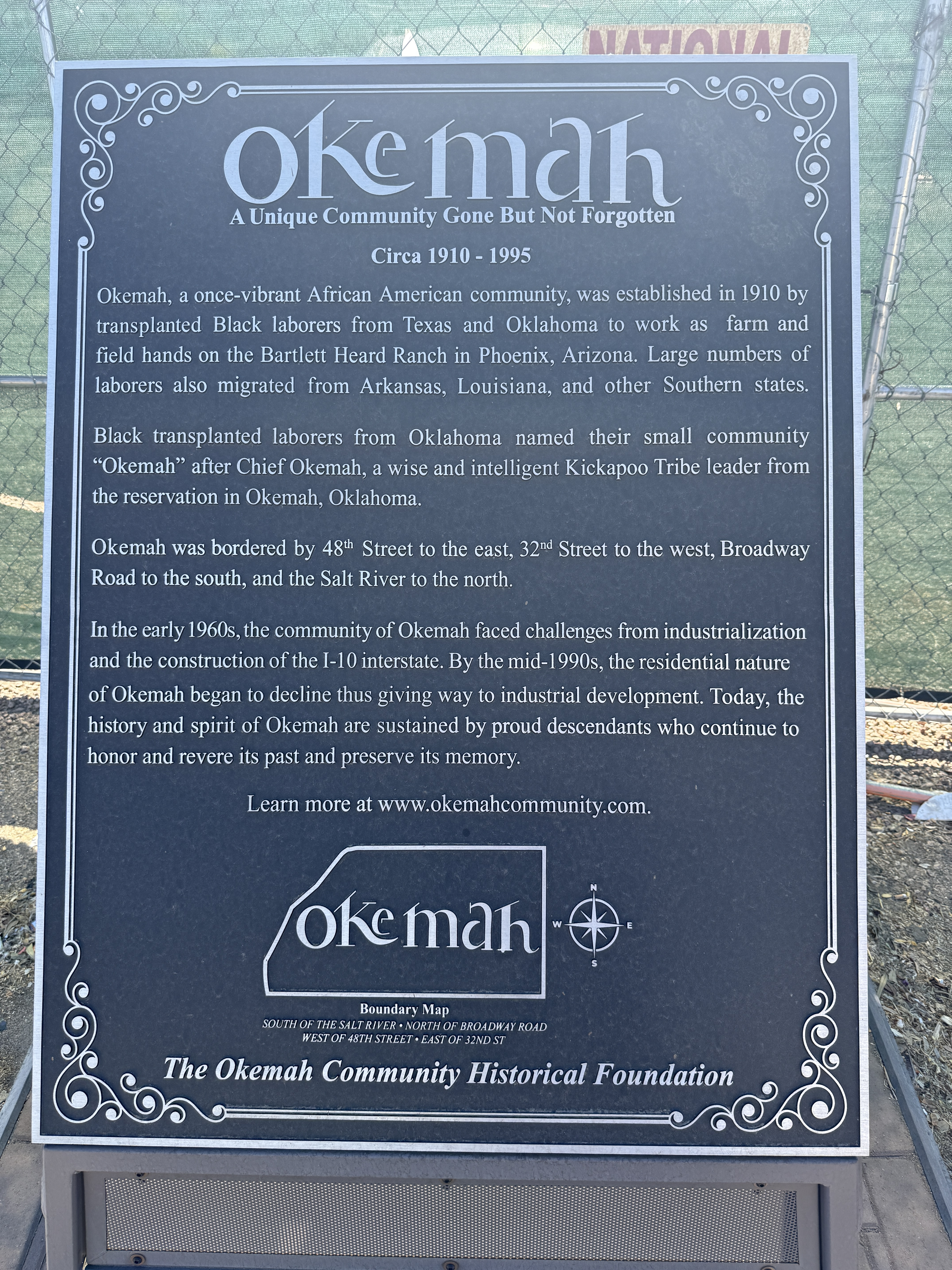
Okemah site marker
