= Westward Ho (Phoenix, Arizona) =

High-rise building in Phoenix, Arizona

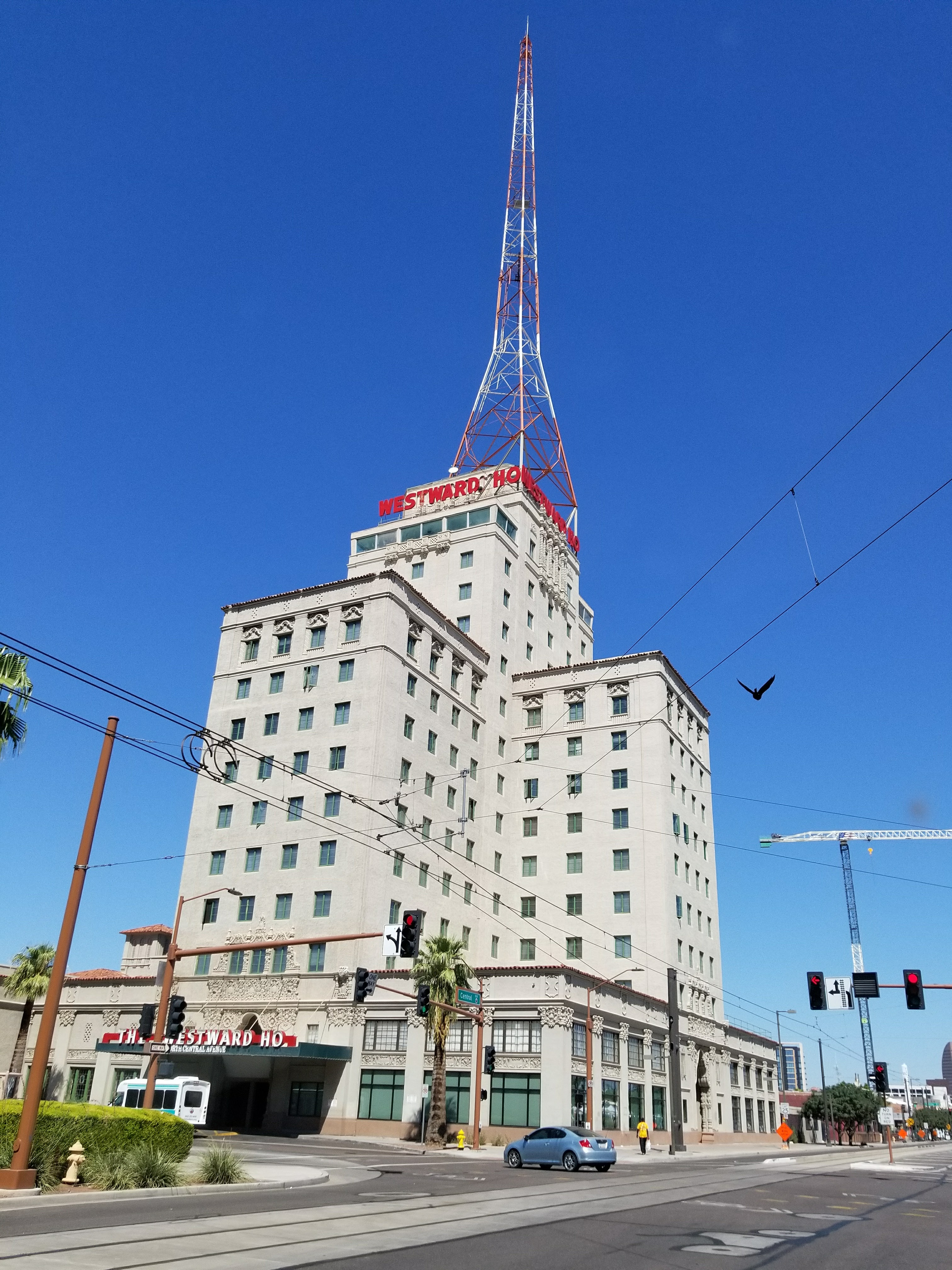
- Interactive map of the Westward Ho area

General information
- Type: Residential (formerly Hotel, Office)
- Architectural style: Mission/Spanish Revival
- Location: 618 North Central Ave., Phoenix, Arizona
- Coordinates: 33°27′17.9″N 112°4′25.82″W
- Construction started: 1927
- Completed: 1928
- Opened: December 15, 1928
- Cost: $2.5 million (estimate)

Height
- Tip: 488 ft (149 m)
- Antenna spire: 280 ft (85 m)
- Roof: 208 ft (63 m)

Technical details
- Floor count: 16
- Lifts/elevators: 3

Design and construction
- Architects: Fisher, Lake & Traver, Louis L. Dorr
- Main contractor: J. V. McNeil Company, 1928, Del E. Webb Construction Company, 1948
- Hotel Westward Ho
- U.S. National Register of Historic Places
- MPS: Phoenix Commercial MRA (AD)
- NRHP reference No.: 82002082
- Added to NRHP: February 19, 1982

The Westward Ho is a high-rise building in Phoenix, Arizona. The 16-story building, which is 208 ft (63m) to the roof, held the title of tallest building in Arizona for over 30 years until the completion of the Meridian Bank Tower in 1960.

The building primarily served as a hotel from its grand opening in 1928 until its official closure on April 7, 1980. The facility also housed several offices and restaurants, including one on the 16th floor called Top of the Ho. There were also several gathering rooms in the hotel, the Turquoise Room on the 2nd floor where many wedding receptions were held, and a large convention center adjacent to the main hotel which could seat 1,600 called the Thunderbird Room where many of Phoenix's big events took place.

After closing as a hotel in 1980, the building's new owners converted it into a subsidized housing complex for the elderly and mobility-impaired. It was later renovated to make apartments more accessible, housing 320 residents in 289 rooms.

== History ==
Construction of the Roosevelt Hotel was announced in spring 1927. The project was financed by Sutherlin-Barry & Company of New Orleans, Louisiana, for owner G. L. Johnson of Chicago, Illinois. The architectural team who designed the hotel was Fisher, Lake & Traver, who had also designed the Hollywood Roosevelt Hotel in Hollywood, California. The hotel was to be operated by Johnson's Pacific Hotel Company. Work came to a halt in early 1928 with only six stories completed. In April, J. V. McNeil Company of Los Angeles, California, were awarded a contract to complete the hotel.

In September 1928, Charles V. Bob of New York City purchased all issued and outstanding shares of the Pacific Hotel Company from G. L. Johnson; complete financing of the hotel was transferred to Bob, including construction, furnishings, and equipment. August Heckscher loaned US$275,000 to Bob prior to the purchase; in return for the loan, Bob pledged 10,000 shares of Pacific Hotel Company to Heckscher. Following the transfer of ownership, the hotel's name was changed to Westward Ho. On September 20, Southwestern Supply Company of Phoenix was awarded a $100,000 contract for the heating and air-conditioning of Western Ho. The hotel officially opened on December 15, 1928.

According to the Sun City Museum librarian, developer Del Webb got his start hanging doors at the hotel during its construction. His namesake company would go on to build an expansion to the hotel. A 5-story annex was built west of the original structure by the Del E. Webb Construction Company in 1948.

The 240 ft (73 m) steel tower and 40 ft (12 m) antenna on top of the building were erected in 1949 to broadcast Phoenix's first television station, KPHO-TV channel 5, taking the total height of the structure to 488 ft (149 m), making it the tallest structure in Downtown Phoenix. In 1960, KPHO moved to its new transmitter on South Mountain. The antennas was used in the 1970s by KXTC 92.3 FM, and later became a cellular telephone tower.

In 1982, the National Register of Historic Places recognized the Westward Ho as a historic building. In 2003, the building was acquired by the Phoenix Preservation Partnership, a Rhode Island–based group of investors.

=== Hotel Westward Ho ===
The building has had several owners, beginning with G. L. Johnson in 1927, who sold it to Charles V. Bob and August Heckscher in 1928 while still under construction. Heckscher took over full control of the Westward Ho in the early 1930s, and after many years of successful ownership died April 26, 1941, leaving his life's real estate to his wife Virginia Henry Curtiss, who died a few months later. The hotel was put up for sale and eventually purchased by partners John B. Mills and R. H. Hawn of Federal Underwriters, Inc, Dallas, Texas, in 1943. They purchased the hotel without themselves seeing it in person, persuaded by W. R. Wayland, president of the Westward Ho since 1937. Wayland was already partnered with the two in their Texas hotel interests, working with their holding company Federal Underwriters, later Associated Federal Hotels, of which Mills was Chairman of the Board. They already owned several other large hotels in Texas, including the former William Penn Hotel in Houston, Texas, which was demolished in 2006, Cliff Towers Hotel in Dallas, and the Hotel Hawn in Temple, Texas. There was no change in management or policy following the change of ownership.

In December 1972, after nearly 30 years of ownership by the Mills family, the hotel was sold to Leisure Inns and Resorts Inc. of Cleveland, Ohio. In March, after encountering financial difficulties and a foreclosure notice, Leisure Inns sold the property to Minneapolis banker Deil Gustafson, owner of four banks in Minnesota and the Tropicana Hotel in Las Vegas, Nevada.

In May 1975, management announced that the facility would no longer operate as a hotel and would become a retirement residence, in August, a foreclosure suit was filed against Gustafson by Republic National Life Insurance Company of Dallas, who claimed the owners were late on mortgage payments and were failing to operate as a hotel, as specified in an original agreement. The Republic National Life Insurance Company purchased the hotel at a Maricopa County sheriff's auction in June 1976, but Gustafson had until December 10, 1976 to pay a $2,044,800 purchase price for the hotel plus a penalty of about $180,000. If he failed to pay before the deadline, the sheriff's office was to give Republic the deed. Hours before the deadline Gustafson obtained the deed through the Maricopa County Recorder's office, and filed for protection from creditors under federal bankruptcy laws; the judge in the case blocked Maricopa County Sheriff's Office from handing over the deed. In March, Gustafson's lawyer and an attorney for Republic National came to an agreement that $2,504,908 was to be paid to Republic National by March 1, 1977, or the stay order on the Sheriff's office would be lifted and Republic National would become the owner. The payment was not made, and ownership of the Westward Ho was passed to Republic National Life Insurance Company on March 1, 1977.

=== Post-hotel ===
In December 1977, the building was sold to Al and Marie Seidel and their partners Roger Rudin and Tom Caprino of R&C Trust and Westward Ho Associates. They had plans of using federal funding to turn Westward Ho into a home for the aged. Renovations began mid-1980 to convert the former hotel into a federally-subsidised housing complex for the elderly; the first residents began moving in the following year.

The building was later used as housing for the physically or mentally disabled. It was again thoroughly remodeled in 2003 and 2004 to improve the living conditions of the residents and restore the building's historical façade. At an estimated cost of $9 million, window-mounted air-conditioners were removed and centralized air-conditioning was installed. Approximately 450 exterior windows were replaced with replicas of the originals, the exterior was power-washed, stucco was repaired, and the building was repainted in its original beige. Upgrades to the automatic fire sprinkler and fire alarm systems were made. Arizona State University offers a clinic in the Westward Ho that provides student services to residents.

== Gallery ==
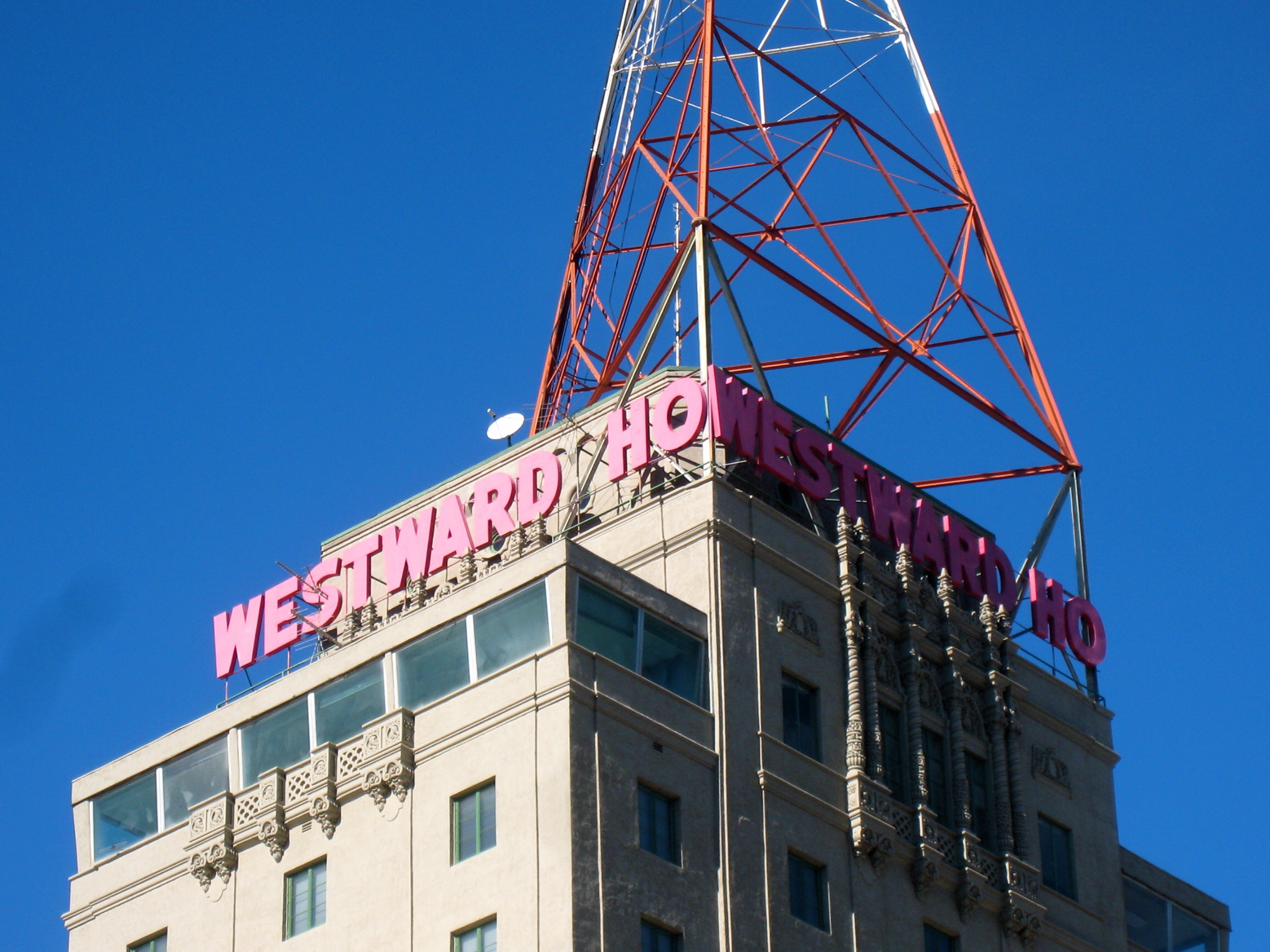

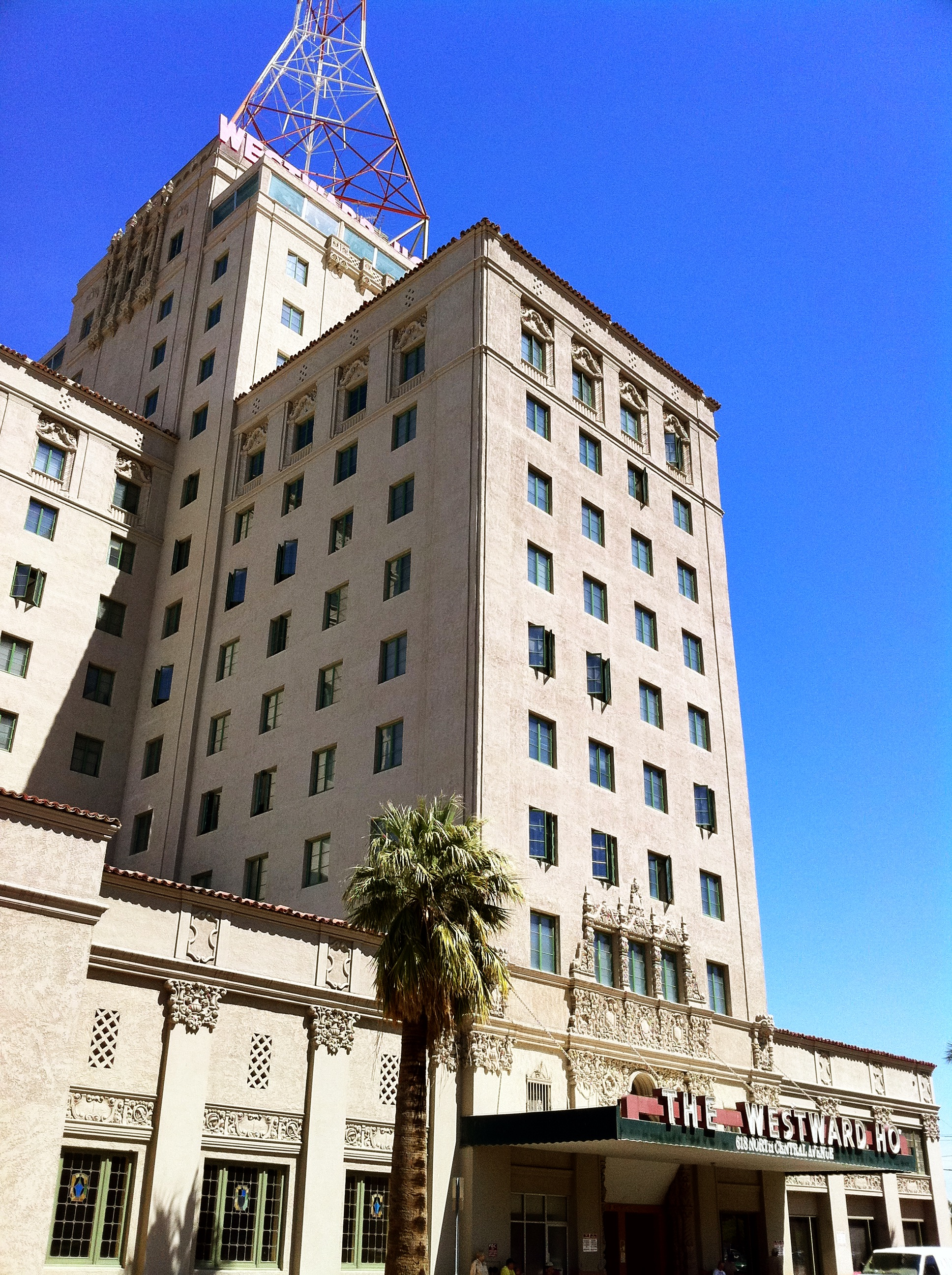

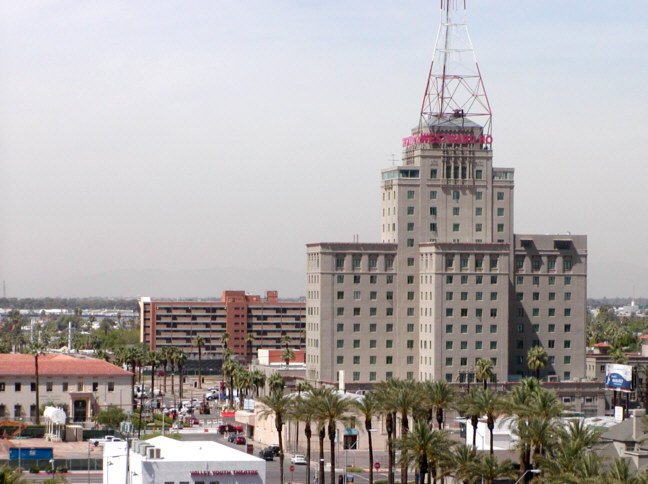

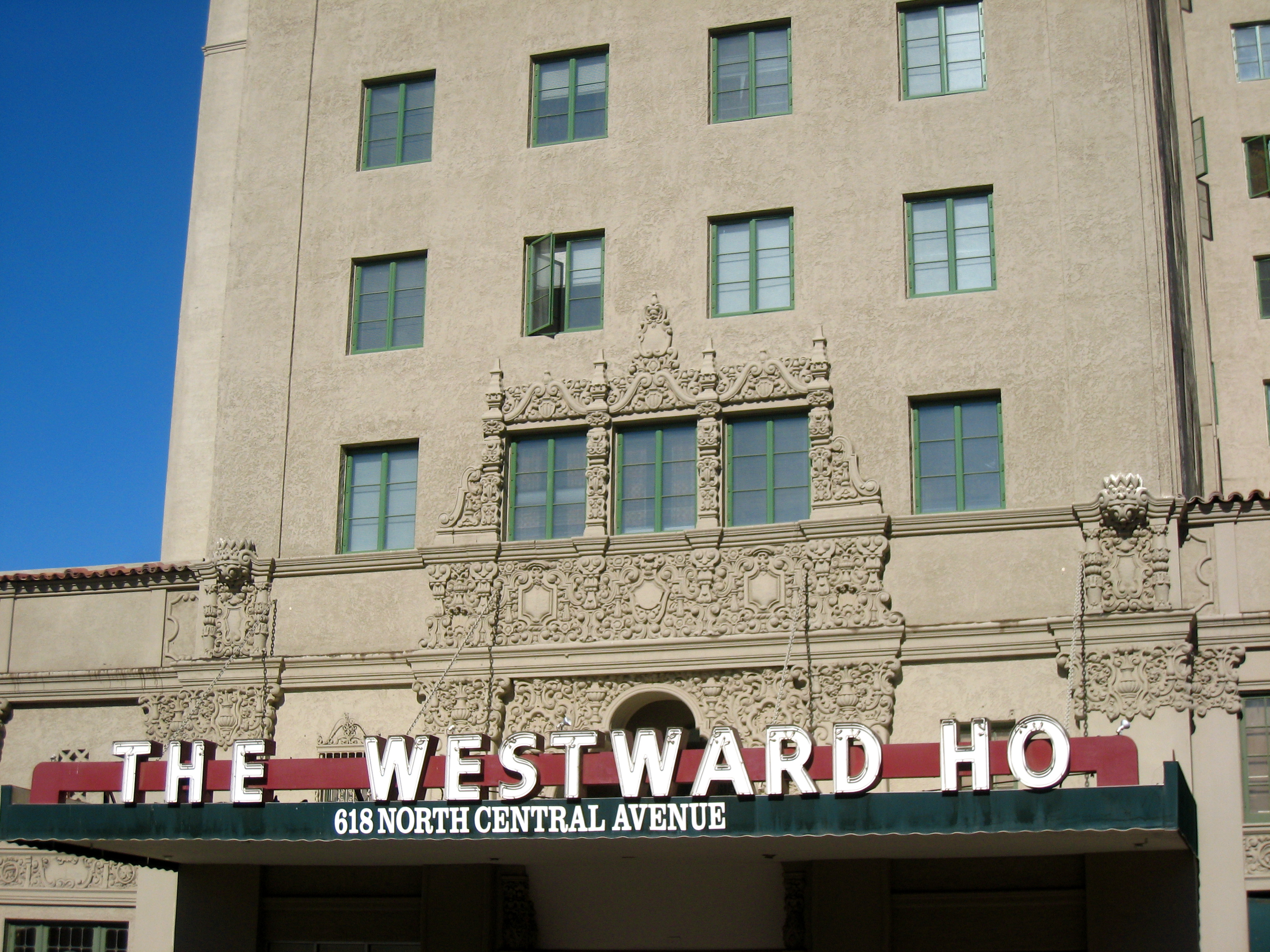

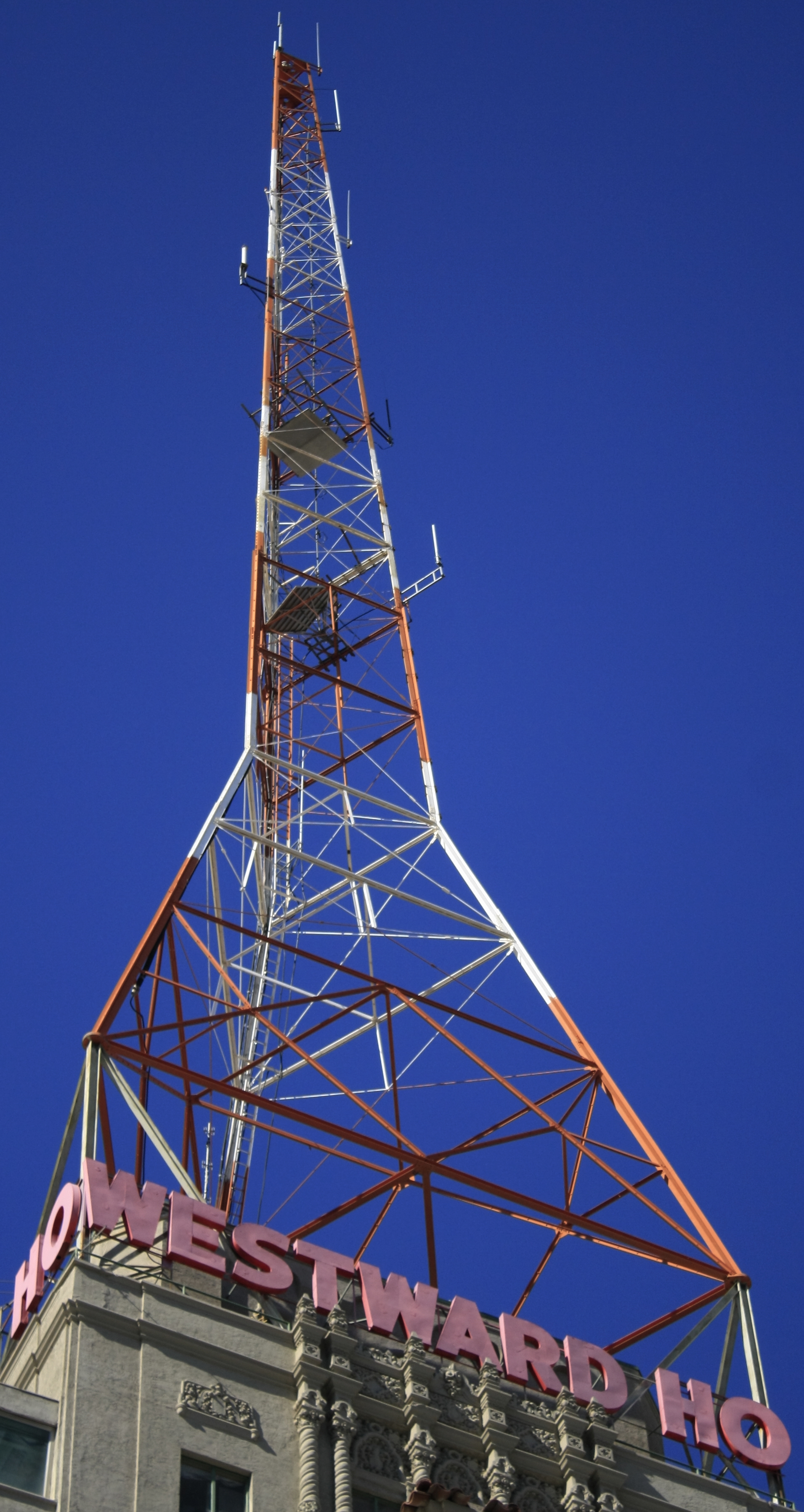

== In popular culture ==
The Westward Ho appears in the opening sequence of the 1960 Alfred Hitchcock film Psycho. The clip fades in centered on Hotel San Carlos, which is located on the northwest corner of Central and Monroe. The former Arizona Bank Building (under-construction) can be seen just west of Hotel San Carlos, and Camelback Mountain can be seen in the background. When the camera pans south to the right you can see the Heard Building in the foreground with its antenna, which was often confused to be the Westward Ho antenna. Behind the Heard Building you can see the Professional Building.

In the 1998 Gus Van Sant remake of Psycho, the camera zooms into a window on the 8th floor of the Westward Ho.

In the 1972 film Pocket Money, actor Paul Newman throws a television set off the 4th story balcony of a hotel room in the J wing of the Westward Ho. Lee Marvin and Strother Martin can also be seen inside the same hotel room. Other areas of the hotel used in the film included the lobby, patio, J Wing stair and walkways, and the hotel barber shop. In the film, the hotel was supposed to be located in Mexico.

In the 1956 film Bus Stop starring Marilyn Monroe, the parade scenes were filmed on Central Ave in front of the entrance.

== Famous guests ==
- Vice President Richard Nixon had breakfast at the Westward Ho before giving a speech in the Thunderbird Room October 15, 1960.
- Evangelist William Marrion Branham preached some sermons here during two campaigns. First on January 28 and 29 in 1961, and later on January 17, 18 and 19 in 1965 for the Full Gospel Business Men’s Fellowship International.
- Actor (and later President) Ronald Reagan was a guest speaker for the Phoenix Chamber Of Commerce in the Thunderbird Room on May 30, 1961.
- President John F. Kennedy stopped by the Westward Ho for dinner in honor of Senator Carl Hayden on November 17, 1961.
- Senator Ted Kennedy campaigned for Presidential candidate John Kerry at the Westward Ho on the afternoon of January 30, 2004.

== See also ==
- Phoenix Historic Property Register
- List of tallest buildings in Phoenix

Preceded by Luhrs Building	Tallest Building in Phoenix; 1927–1960; 208 ft (63m)	Succeeded by Meridian Bank Tower
