= Hotel San Carlos (Phoenix) =

Historic hotel in Phoenix, Arizona

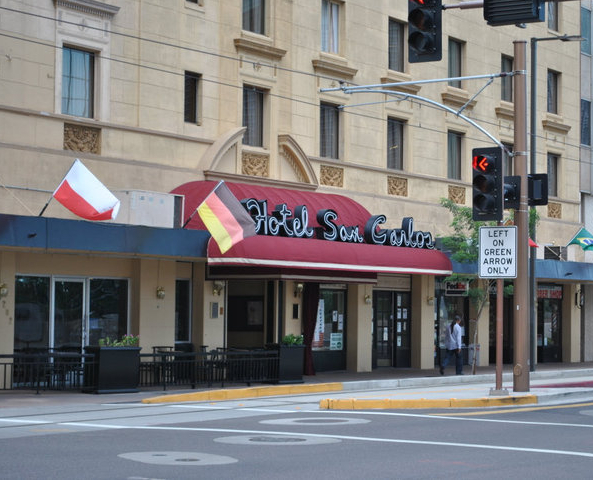
- The Hotel San Carlos marquee as seen from Central Avenue

General information
- Location: 202 N Central Ave., Phoenix, Arizona, 85004 U.S.
- Coordinates: 33°27′2″N 112°4′27″W
- Groundbreaking: August 17, 1927
- Opening: March 19, 1928

Design and construction
- Architect: George Whitecross Richie
- Developer: San Carlos Hotel Company
- Main contractor: Kinnie & Westerhouse

Website
- hotelsancarlos.com
- Hotel San Carlos
- U.S. National Register of Historic Places
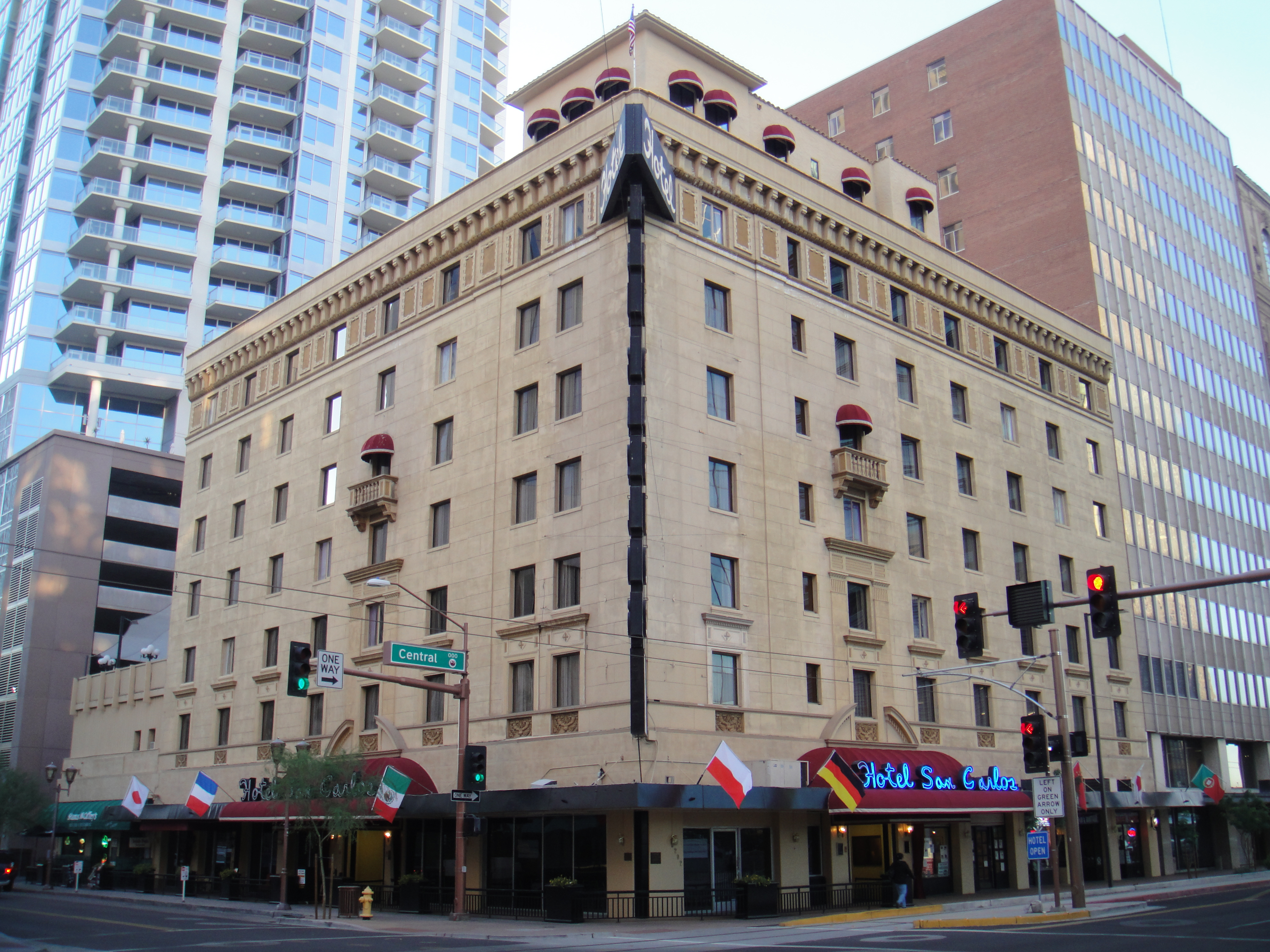
- the Hotel San Carlos in Downtown Phoenix

- Location within Arizona Location within the United States
- Area: less than one acre
- Built: 1928
- Architects: Richie, George Whitecross
- Architectural style: Renaissance
- MPS: Phoenix Commercial MRA (AD)
- NRHP reference No.: 83003498
- Added to NRHP: December 8, 1983

The Hotel San Carlos branch in Phoenix, Arizona, also known as San Carlos Hotel, is both an operating hotel and tourist site. It has been associated with ghost sightings. It was listed on the National Register of Historic Places (NRHP) in 1983 as San Carlos Hotel. Hotel San Carlos is a member of Historic Hotels of America, the official program of the National Trust for Historic Preservation

== Historical facts ==
The site where the hotel sits was the location of the first school in Phoenix. The 4-room adobe school was inaugurated in 1874 and was replaced with a larger structure in 1879. The school was enlarged several times in subsequent years but was condemned in 1916, with construction of a luxury hotel in mind. In addition, many area children died during the 1918 Spanish flu epidemic that attacked the United States.

In 1919, the land was bought by the Babbitt family (relatives of Bruce Babbitt, former Arizona Governor and Secretary of the Interior), who intended to build a hotel. The San Carlos Hotel project was finally begun by Charles Harris and Dwight D. Heard who purchased the property from the Babbitts. Harris and Heard formed the Hotel San Carlos Company and construction began in 1927. The hotel was designed by nationally known architect George Whitecross Richie in the Italian Renaissance style. Construction was undertaken by Kinnie & Westerhouse General Contractors. The hotel was state of the art with air conditioning (the first in Phoenix), elevators, circulating chilled water in the rooms and steam heat. The hotel grand opening was on March 19, 1928. The hotel was built at a cost of nearly $850,000. Charles Harris was the co-owner and managing partner of the San Carlos, and took over full-time management of the San Carlos after the original manager, Dwight Heard, died in 1929. Harris moved his family into the roof-top bungalow (or penthouse) and worked diligently to keep the San Carlos Hotel open during the Great Depression. The hotel remained in the Harris family until 1967 when Harris' widow, Elsie, sold the property to an investment group. The investment group sold the San Carlos to Gregory Melikian in 1970. Since 1970, the Melikian family have owned, operated, and restored the San Carlos Hotel to match its original styling alongside other historical Phoenix properties.

The San Carlos has hosted celebrities including Mae West, Clark Gable, Carole Lombard, Marilyn Monroe and Gene Autry. The hotel competed with the Westward Ho hotel, which was located on the site of what once was Phoenix's first radio transmitter.

The Hotel San Carlos in Phoenix is a member of Historic Hotels of America, a program of the National Trust for Historic Preservation. The hotel underwent a $1-million remodel in 2003 and work continues on the historic boutique hotel. The hotel faces competition with five-star hotels such as The Phoenician, Arizona Biltmore Hotel the Ritz Carlton, many Hilton Hotels and the Hyatt Regency Phoenix. However, the Hotel San Carlos remains a popular tourist destination in downtown Phoenix, six blocks from Chase Field (home of the Arizona Diamondbacks), five blocks from Talking Stick Resort Arena (home of the Phoenix Suns), and less than three blocks from the Dodge Theatre, Symphony Hall Phoenix, Orpheum Theatre, the Phoenix Convention Center and the Herberger Performing Arts Center.

The hotel can be briefly seen in the opening shot of Alfred Hitchcock's 1960 film Psycho as the camera pans the skyline of downtown Phoenix.

== See also ==
- National Register of Historic Places listings in Yuma County, Arizona – for the San Carlos Hotel in Yuma, also on the NRHP in Arizona
- List of historic properties in Phoenix
- Phoenix Historic Property Register
