= Beacher's Madhouse =

Beacher’s Madhouse
- Genre: Contemporary circus
- Date of premiere: 2002
- Location: New York City, New York; Las Vegas, Nevada; Los Angeles, California

Creative team
- Creator, director: Jeff Beacher
- Co-director, host: Pete Giovine
- Official website

Beacher's Madhouse is a contemporary circus created by Jeff Beacher that has played in New York City, Las Vegas and Los Angeles.

The show debuted in New York in 2002.

Beacher's Madhouse premiered in Las Vegas in 2004 at the Hard Rock Hotel. While in Los Angeles the show was performed at The Hollywood Roosevelt Hotel.

The show was hosted by co-director and MC Pete Giovine.

In 2008 the show went on an 81 city tour entitled Beacher’s Costume Ball Tour, and in 2009, the show became a featured act on the Warped Tour and Mayhem Festival.

The 2013 Beacher's Madhouse return to Las Vegas at the MGM Grand Las Vegas was hosted by singer Miley Cyrus.

Beacher's Madhouse also performed in 2016 in Calgary, Alberta, Canada.
