= Jeff Beacher =

American producer (born 1973)

- Born: March 25, 1973 (age 53); Brooklyn, New York, U.S.
- Occupation: Entertainment producer
- Notable work: Beacher’s Madhouse
- Website: jeffbeacher.com

Jeff Beacher (born March 25, 1973) is an American producer, entrepreneur and master of ceremonies who created, produced and hosted the long-running live theater series, Beacher's Madhouse. Through his company Beacher Media Group he develops consulting and media relations.

In 2004, then mayor Oscar Goodman awarded Jeff Beacher the key to the city of Las Vegas. Jeff Beacher and Beacher’s Madhouse productions have appeared on a variety of television series including Gene Simmons: Family Jewels.

== Early years ==
Jeff Beacher was born on March 25, 1973, and adopted at birth by Dr. Fred and Shelly Beacher in Brooklyn, New York, before the family relocated to Woodmere, Long Island. He attended George W. Hewlett High School, the alma mater of several Hollywood influencers including director Edward Burns, producer Howard Deutch and writer Brian Burns. During high school, he created several businesses including one that sold and distributed roses to classmates at his school and in the tri-state area.

During his career as a stand-up comedian, in 2002 he decided to produce his comedy showcases selling out The Paramount Theater at The Madison Square Garden, and then The Supper Club (now the Edison Ballroom) in New York City for over a year before hosting one final performance at The Paramount Theater at Madison Square Garden in 2003 before him relocating to Las Vegas.

== Career ==
=== Las Vegas ===
In 2003, Jeff Beacher moved his operation to Las Vegas at the invitation of Harry Morton, founder of Pink Taco restaurants and the son of Peter Morton the owner of Hard Rock International. He was offered the hotel's largest performance venue, The Joint, to create a unique and re-occurring variety show. In an effort to attract attention, upon arriving in Las Vegas and setting up his show, he dove into a mermaid themed fish tank inside the MGM Grand Las Vegas at the Rainforest Cafe on December 11, 2003, the same night as the Billboard Music Awards. His first show at The Joint debuted a few weeks after the incident on December 30, 2003.

Originally titled, Beacher's Comedy Madhouse, by the time he'd begun receiving national media attention in 2004, the name had been shortened to Beacher's Madhouse and became a popular celebrity and tourist vaudeville-style attraction in Las Vegas until 2008 (and then resumed in 2013 at the MGM Grand Hotel and Casino). During his tenure in Las Vegas, Jeff Beacher and Beacher's Madhouse received global attention for both the variety and uniqueness of performers in each show and the celebrity support he and the show received. Equally as newsworthy were the unplanned spontaneous events that occurred including a highly publicized fight on April 8, 2006, between two rival all-dwarf KISS cover bands. The event was covered in depth on programs like The Daily Show and The Howard Stern Show.

Eventually Beacher's Madhouse moved to a residency at the MGM Grand Hotel and Casino where it remained until 2015. Though he'd agreed to a twenty-year, 100 million-dollar deal with the hotel, his health was declining due to tremendous stress and weight gain. In 2014 he was reported to have weighed over 400 pounds and was suffering from a variety of health problems. That year while performing as "Big Britney" a characterization of Britney Spears he himself portrayed in drag, he collapsed and was hospitalized.

=== Beacher's Madhouse Tour ===
In 2008, Jeff Beacher took his variety show on an 81-city tour entitled Beacher's Costume Ball Tour, and in 2009, the show became a featured act on the Warped Tour and Mayhem Festival. The Costume Ball Tour was in partnership with MySpace and enjoyed sold-out performances across America in a variety of venues from hotels, to nightclubs, to theaters. The first sold-out shows were in Shreveport, Louisiana, with a reported audience of over 2,000. Other cities on the tour included Dallas, Chicago, Miami, and San Diego. The tour included a fixed set of acts which offered a variety of performers as well as local artists who were hired along the route. Included were the Tiny KISS and Tiny Saturday Night Fever dancers.

On Friday, December 27, 2013 he re-opened his weekly show in Las Vegas at the MGM Grand Hotel and Casino with special guest host Miley Cyrus.

=== Beacher's Madhouse Los Angeles ===
Because of health concerns, Jeff Beacher relocated to Los Angeles where he'd already established a secondary Beacher's Madhouse at The Hollywood Roosevelt Hotel in Hollywood in 2009. Beacher's Madhouse was located inside the famed Cinegrill nightclub that was once home to the Academy Awards in the hotel’s basement. Beacher's Madhouse in Los Angeles was a highly popularized theater that attracted a wide variety of celebrities including Katy Perry, Selena Gomez, Britney Spears, Miley Cyrus, Paris Hilton, George Clooney, Sandra Bullock, Quentin Tarantino, Demi Lovato, Leonardo DiCaprio, Michael B. Jordan and Zac Efron.
