= Fisher, Lake & Traver =

American architectural firm

Fisher, Lake & Traver was an architecture firm based in Fresno and Los Angeles, California. It was the successor to Shields, Fisher and Lake, based in Fresno. Three of their buildings (Hollywood Roosevelt Hotel, The Willmore, and Westward Ho) have been entered into the National Register of Historic Places.

== Partners ==
=== H. Rafael Lake ===
H. Rafael Lake
- Born: February 9, 1894; San Rafael, California
- Died: August 9, 1958 (aged 64); Fresno, California
- Education: University of California, Berkeley, 1913; B.S., Massachusetts Institute of Technology, 1916
- Occupation: Architect
- Practice: Shields, Fisher and Lake; Fisher, Lake & Traver; Lake and Hastrup

H. Rafael Lake was born in 1894 in San Rafael, California and grew up in the bay area. He started college at the University of California, Berkeley in 1913 and completed his undergraduate degree in architecture at Massachusetts Institute of Technology in 1916.

After graduating and World War One military service, Lake moved to New York, where he worked with Cass Gilbert from 1918 to 1923. In 1923, Lake moved to Fresno, California after receiving a commission to design the Hotel Californian. In 1924, he partnered with Fisher and Shields to create Shields, Fisher and Lake, and in 1925, Traver replaced Shields to create Fisher, Lake & Traver. For the latter, Fisher and Traver manned the firm's Los Angeles office while Lake manned its Fresno office.

Post Fisher, Lake & Traver, Lake partnered with William Hastrup, then with Elso Di Luck.

=== Harrison B. Traver ===
Harrison B. Traver
- Born: December 2, 1881; Hudson, New York
- Died: March 4, 1973 (aged 91); El Dorado County, California
- Education: B.Arch. University of Pennsylvania, 1906
- Occupation: Architect
- Practice: Coates and Traver; Fisher, Lake & Traver

Harrison B. Traver was born in 1881 in Hudson, New York and completed his undergraduate degree in architecture at the University of Pennsylvania in 1906. From 1907 to 1911, he worked as a draftsman for Paul Cret and Harvey Wiley Corbett and was a Staff Architect in California. In 1911, he partnered with William Demmond Coates Jr., and in 1912, they gained statewide attention when their proposal for a San Francisco City Hall design competition took second prize. The partners moved to Fresno in 1914, where they designed Liberty Theatre, Fresno High School, Hanford High School, and Porterville High School.

In 1925 Traver replaced Shields at Shields, Fisher and Lake to create Fisher, Lake & Traver, where Fisher and Traver manned the firm's Los Angeles office while Lake manned its Fresno office. Post Fisher, Lake & Traver, Traver partnered with Theodore Jacobs, then he practiced alone.

=== Fisher ===
In 1924, Fisher partnered with Shields and Lake to create Shields, Fisher and Lake, and in 1925 Traver replaced Shields to create Fisher, Lake & Traver. For the latter, Fisher and Traver manned the firm's Los Angeles office while Lake manned its Fresno office.

=== Shields ===
In 1924, Shields partnered with Fisher and Lake to create Shields, Fisher and Lake, and in 1925, he was replaced by Traver.

== Selected works ==
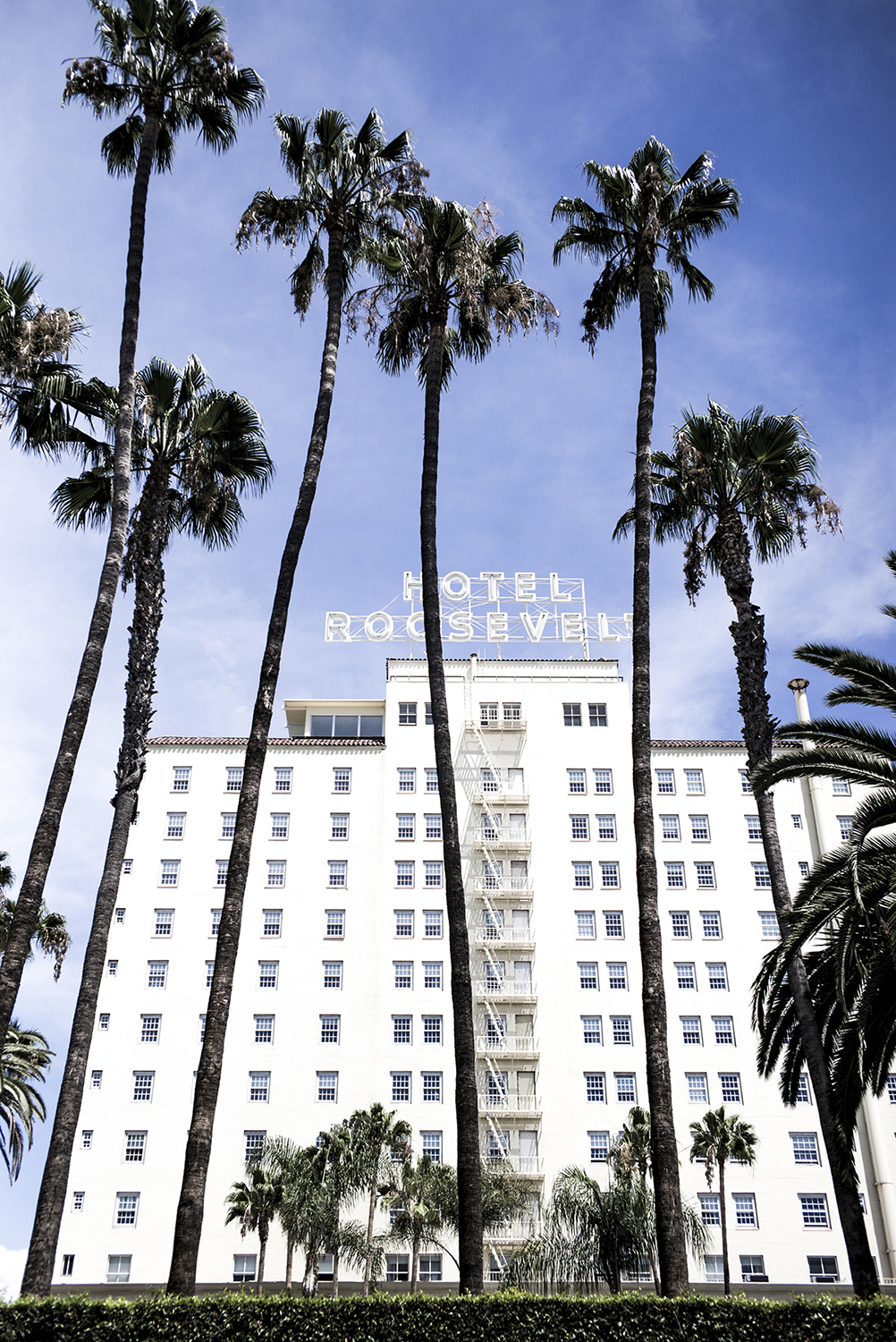
Hollywood Roosevelt Hotel

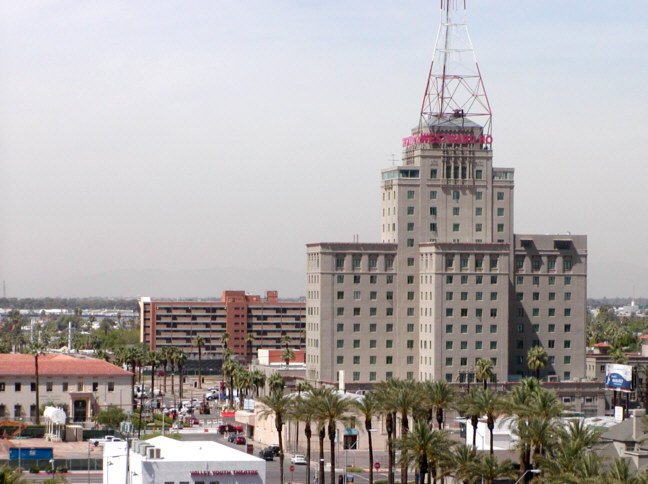
Westward Ho

Shields, Fisher and Lake built the Wilson Theatre in Fresno, California.

Fisher, Lake & Traver are known for their works the southwest United States, particularly in Fresno and in and around Los Angeles. Their notable works include (in California unless otherwise noted):

- Stillwell Apartments, Long Beach, 1925
- Hollywood Roosevelt Hotel, Los Angeles, 1927, contributing property in the Hollywood Boulevard Commercial and Entertainment District, Los Angeles Historic Cultural Monument No. 545
- The Willmore, Long Beach, 1927, National Register of Historic Places No. 99000579, Long Beach historic landmark 16.52.260
- Westward Ho, Phoenix, Arizona, 1927–1928, National Register of Historic Places No. 82002082, Phoenix Historic Property Register No. 96
- L. C. Wesley Garage, Fresno, 1931
- Blue Cross Veterinary Clinic, Fresno, 1936
- Trinity Methodist Church, Fresno

== See also ==
- List of American architects
- List of people from Los Angeles
