= Hollywood Roosevelt Hotel =

Hotel in Hollywood, Los Angeles, California

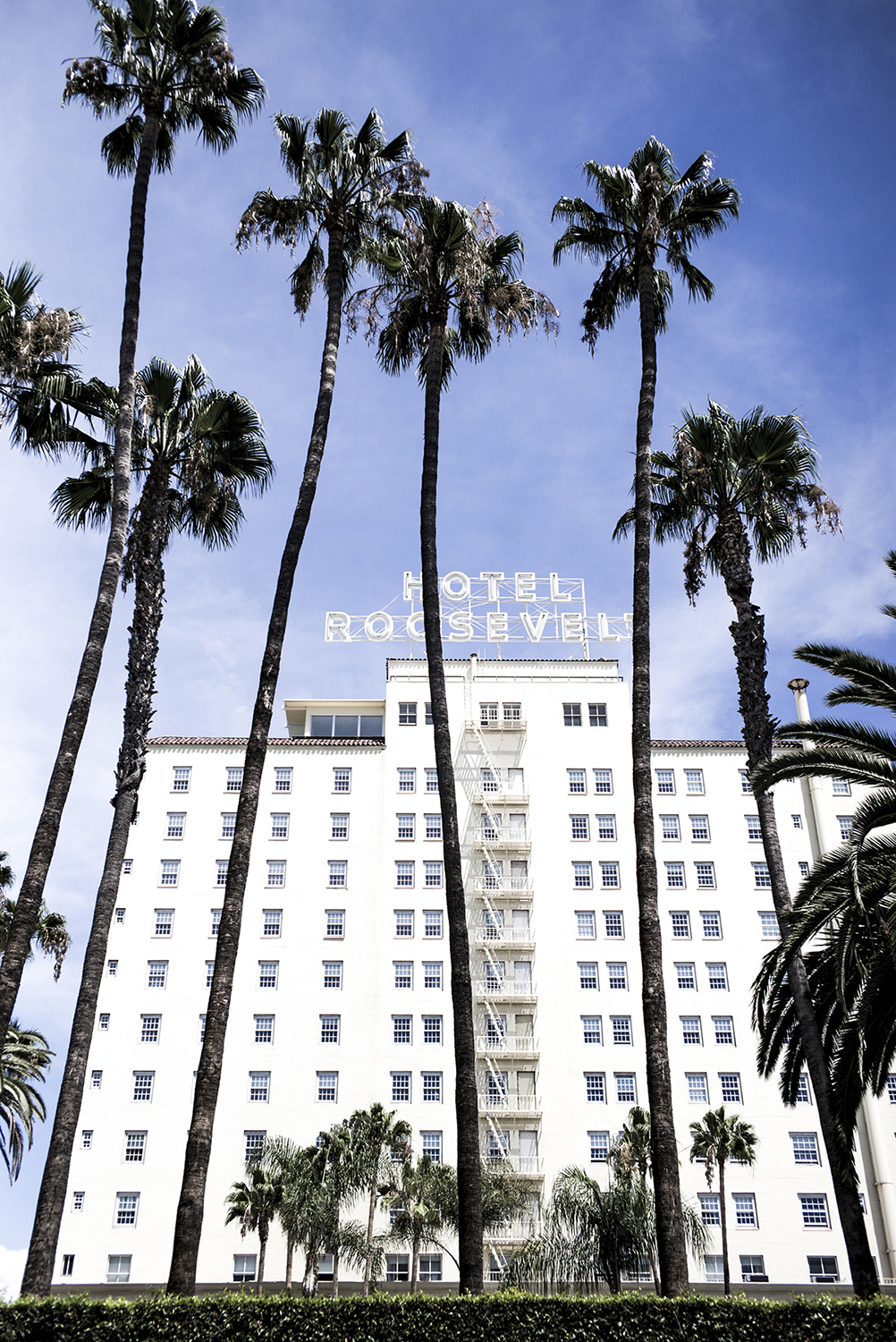
- Hollywood Roosevelt Hotel in 2015

- Location within the Los Angeles metropolitan area Location within California Location within the United States
- Alternative names: Hotel Roosevelt
- Hotel chain: Preferred Hotels & Resorts

General information
- Location: 7000 Hollywood Boulevard; Hollywood, California; 90028
- Coordinates: 34°6′4″N 118°20′30″W
- Opening: May 15, 1927
- Owner: Goodwin Gaw; David Chang

Technical details
- Floor count: 12

Design and construction
- Architect: Fisher, Lake & Traver

Other information
- Number of rooms: 300
- Number of suites: 63
- Number of restaurants: 2

Website
- thehollywoodroosevelt.com

Los Angeles Historic-Cultural Monument
- Designated: 1991
- Reference no.: 545

U.S. National Register of Historic Places
- Designated: April 4, 1985
- Part of: Hollywood Boulevard Commercial and Entertainment National Historic District
- Reference no.: 85000704

The Hollywood Roosevelt Hotel, also known as Hotel Roosevelt, is a historic hotel located at 7000 Hollywood Boulevard in the Hollywood district of Los Angeles, California.

== History ==
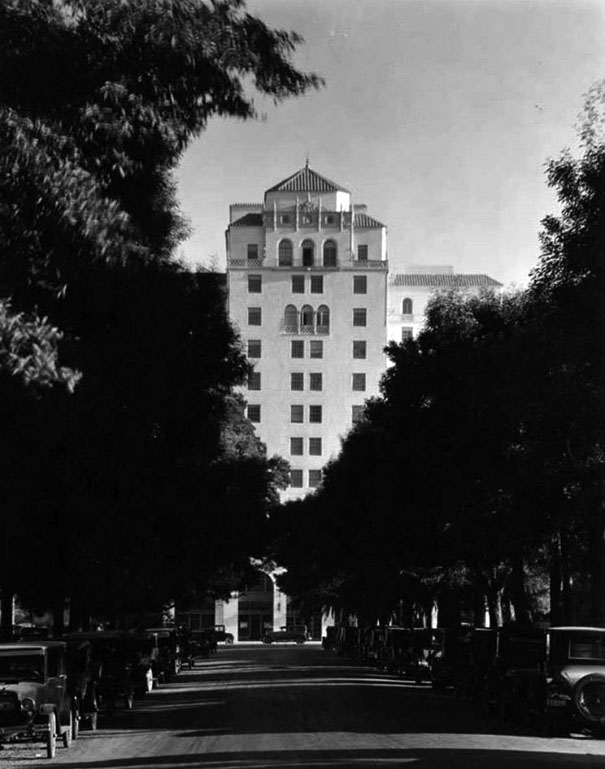
The hotel in 1927

The Hollywood Roosevelt Hotel was built in 1926, in what is known as the Golden Era of Los Angeles architecture, and was named after the 26th president of the United States, Theodore Roosevelt. It was financed by a group that included Louis B. Mayer, Mary Pickford, Douglas Fairbanks, and Sid Grauman. It cost $2.5 million ($46.3 million in 2025) to complete and opened on May 15, 1927.

The hotel went into a decline in the 1950s. An owner around that time demolished its archways, covered up its elaborately painted ceilings and painted the entire hotel seafoam green. Radisson Hotels purchased the hotel in 1985 and, using original blueprints and historic photos of the hotel's Spanish Colonial architecture, undertook a $35 million ($105 million in 2025) renovation, restoring the lobby's coffered ceiling and adding a three-tiered fountain, among other improvements. The million-dollar mural at the bottom of the hotel's Tropicana Pool was painted by David Hockney in 1987.

In 1985, the Hollywood Boulevard Commercial and Entertainment District was added to the National Register of Historic Places, with Hotel Roosevelt listed as a contributing property in the district. On August 13, 1991, the City of Los Angeles declared the hotel building Los Angeles Historic-Cultural Monument No. 545.

In 1995, Goodwin Gaw purchased the hotel from Clarion Hotels, with David Chang later becoming co-owner. In 2005, the Thompson Hotel Group assumed oversight of the hotel's management. The Dodd Mitchell Design Group and David Siguaw oversaw a $30 million ($49.5 million in 2025) renovation of the hotel in 2005. Since 2015, the hotel has been run independently by its own management company. In 2015, the hotel completed a $25 million ($34 million in 2025) renovation with rooms designed by Yabu Pushelberg, and plans for a new poolside food and beverage outlet. The hotel was then inducted into Historic Hotels of America, an official program of the National Trust for Historic Preservation, in 2016.

== Design and style ==
The 12-story hotel has 300 guest rooms including 63 suites. It occupies a site on the Hollywood Walk of Fame and across Hollywood Boulevard from the TCL Chinese Theatre. The building has a Spanish Colonial Revival Style interior, with leather sofas, wrought-iron chandeliers and colorful tiled fountains.

The architecture firm Fisher, Lake & Traver is also credited with the Westward Ho Hotel in Phoenix and The Willmore Building in Long Beach.

The Gable-Lombard penthouse, a 3,200 square-foot duplex with an outdoor deck with views of the Hollywood Hills and the Hollywood sign, is named for Clark Gable and Carole Lombard, who used to stay in the room for five dollars a night. The Marilyn Monroe suite is named for the actress, who lived at the hotel for two years early in her career. Other accommodations include King Superior rooms and vintage 1950s poolside cabanas.

== Restaurants and bars ==
The hotel has a total of eight restaurants, bars and lounges. 25 Degrees is a hamburger restaurant located just off the hotel lobby. It was opened in 2005. Public Kitchen & Bar features American food in an Old Hollywood-style dining room. Tim Goodell is the head chef of both restaurants. The Spare Room is a gaming parlor and cocktail lounge; the Library Bar is a cocktail bar with cocktails made using locally sourced ingredients; and Tropicana Bar overlooks the pool. Beacher's Madhouse is a vaudeville-inspired theater owned and operated by Jeff Beacher. Teddy's, a nightclub located off the lobby, was considered a celebrity haunt. It opened in 2005, was remodeled in 2012 and closed in 2015.

== In popular culture ==
The first Academy Awards ceremony was held at the Hollywood Roosevelt Hotel on May 16, 1929, inside the Blossom Ballroom. A private ceremony open only to Academy members, it was hosted by Academy president Douglas Fairbanks and held three months after the winners were announced, with 270 people in attendance. At the time, the "Oscar" nickname for the award had not yet been invented (the nickname would be introduced four years later).

Facing heavy debt in 1986, five-time Academy Award winner Lyle Wheeler sold boxes of his possessions, including his five Oscars. His award for art direction for The Diary of Anne Frank was auctioned for $21,250 ($62,415 in 2025) to William Kaiser. Kaiser returned the award to Wheeler at a ceremony held at the Hollywood Roosevelt Hotel in 1989.

The hotel has hosted the Golden Raspberry Awards, the ceremony recognizing the year's worst in film, on numerous occasions.

The pool at the Roosevelt Hotel was featured in a 1955 episode of I Love Lucy when the Ricardos and Mertzes came to Hollywood.

Several scenes from the 1988 film Sunset, starring Bruce Willis and James Garner, were filmed at the hotel, including a recreation of the 1929 Academy Awards ceremony.

The scene of the 1989 film The Fabulous Baker Boys where Susie (Michelle Pfeiffer) sings "Makin' Whoopie" while Jack (Jeff Bridges) plays piano was shot at the Cinegrill nightclub in the hotel.

The 2011 video game L.A. Noire features the hotel as a discoverable landmark.

The 2013 videogame Grand Theft Auto V features the Vinewood Von Crastenburg Hotel, based on the Hollywood Roosevelt Hotel. The in-game Von Crastenburg hotels are a parody of the Hilton chain.

The hotel's hallway can be seen in episode 7 of the 2016 FX true crime anthology television series The People v. O.J. Simpson: American Crime Story, as a substitute for an Oakland hotel where Christopher Darden and Marcia Clark spend the night.

Other films shot on location at the hotel include Internal Affairs (starring Richard Gere), Beverly Hills Cop II (starring Eddie Murphy) and Catch Me If You Can (starring Leonardo DiCaprio and Tom Hanks and directed by Steven Spielberg). Other television shows shot at the hotel include Knots Landing, Moonlighting and Curb Your Enthusiasm.

Prince performed five shows at the hotel in 2007, which included dinner with his personal chef, a two-hour performance and a post-set jazz jam.

The TV series Lucifer frequently includes exterior views of the hotel in establishing shots. A scene between Lucifer and Amenadiel in the first season episode "Take Me Back to Hell" takes place on the roof, with the back of the Roosevelt's sign visible.

The Marvel's Agents of S.H.I.E.L.D. episode "Out of the Past" featured the hotel prominently throughout the episode.

== Notable residents and guests ==
Marilyn Monroe lived at the hotel for two years early in her career, and posed for her first commercial photography shoot by the pool. She and Arthur Miller were said to have met at the hotel's Cinegrill nightclub.

Montgomery Clift stayed at the hotel for three months in 1952 during the filming of From Here to Eternity.

Frances Farmer was honored at a party there in 1958, the night she appeared on Ralph Edwards' This Is Your Life.

Errol Flynn is rumored to have created his recipe for bootleg gin in a tub in the hotel's barbershop.

Shirley Temple learned to do her famous stairstep dance routine on the hotel stairs.

Astrologer and writer Linda Goodman wrote several of her books in a suite at the hotel.

Character actress Clara Blandick died by suicide in the hotel in 1962.

Actress Elizabeth Patterson, widely recognized for her role as Mrs. Trumbull on the classic comedy series I Love Lucy, lived in the hotel during her 35-year film and television career.

Other notable hotel guests include Charlie Chaplin, H. G. Wells, Clark Gable, Max Baer Sr., Carole Lombard, Mary Martin, F. Scott Fitzgerald, Ernest Hemingway, Prince, Brad Pitt, and Angelina Jolie.

American talk show host Jimmy Kimmel, whose own show takes place in Hollywood, often uses the hotel as a prize for a game called "Hostel La Vista" that pits two tourists that are visiting Los Angeles staying in a nearby youth hostel against each other. In this game, the contestants are asked various questions about the city of Los Angeles and the state of California as a whole. The player who gets the most questions right wins, leaves the hostel and gets to stay at the hotel for the remainder of their stay for free.

== Alleged hauntings ==
Throughout the years, there have been rumors of hauntings and ghosts at the hotel. Some involve celebrities who previously stayed at the hotel, such as Marilyn Monroe, Montgomery Clift, and Errol Flynn. Others involve a little girl in a blue dress named Caroline. There have also been reports of cold spots, photographic "orbs", and mysterious phone calls to the hotel operator.

== Gallery ==
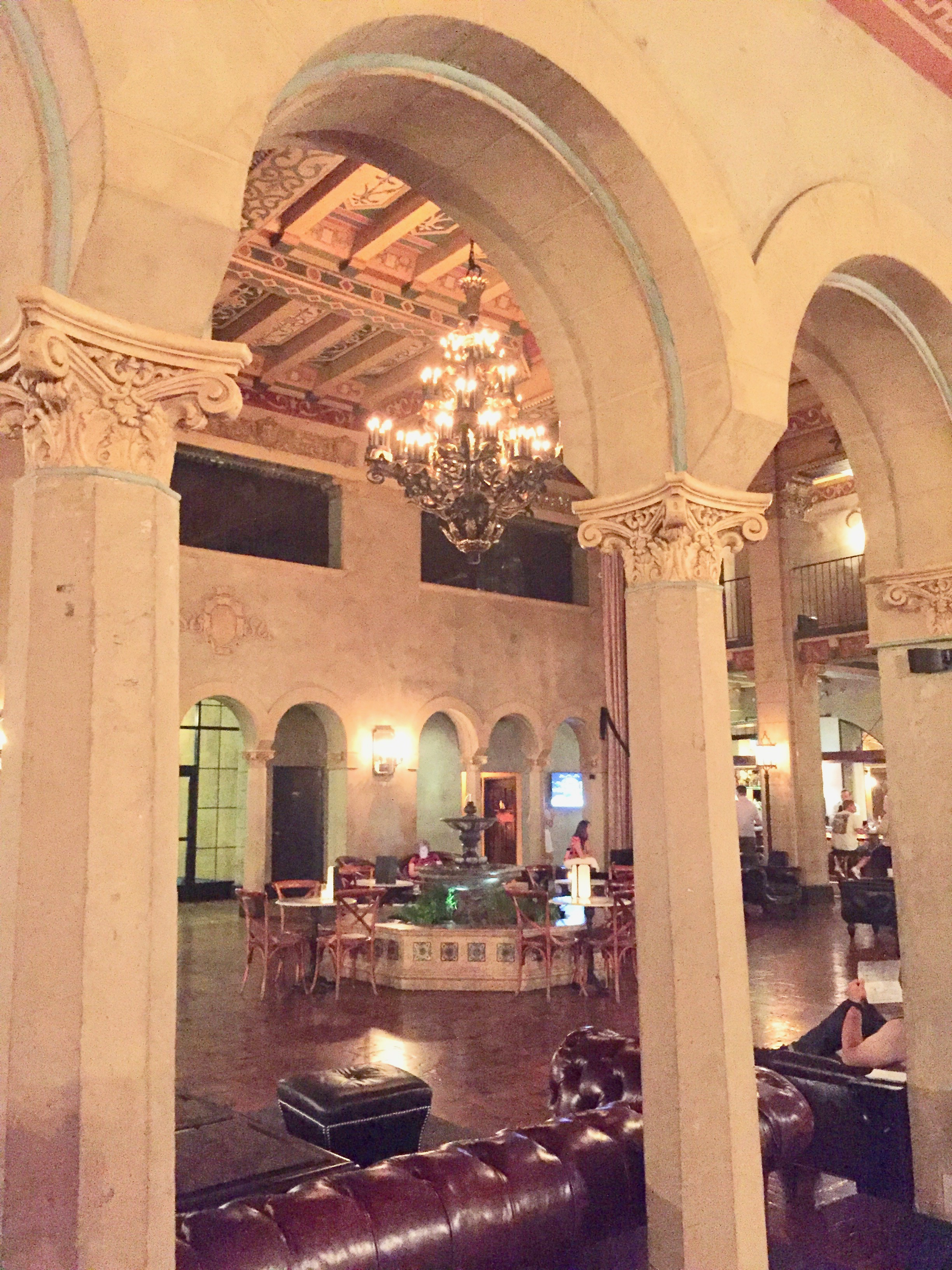
Lobby

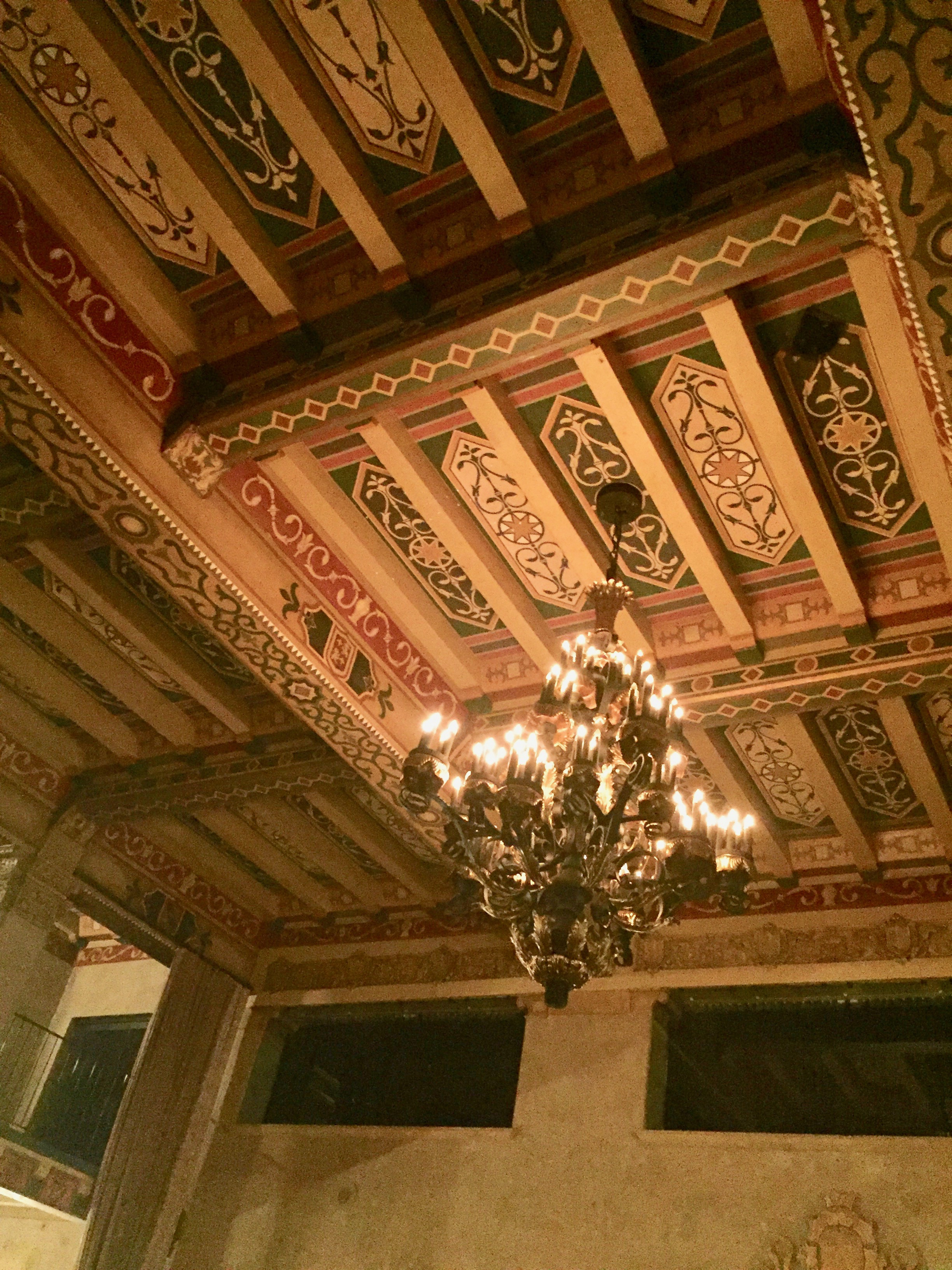
Coffered ceiling

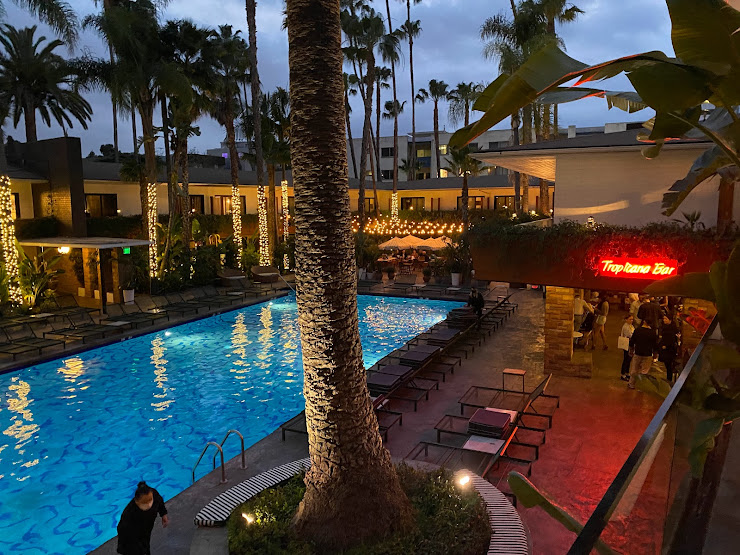
Pool

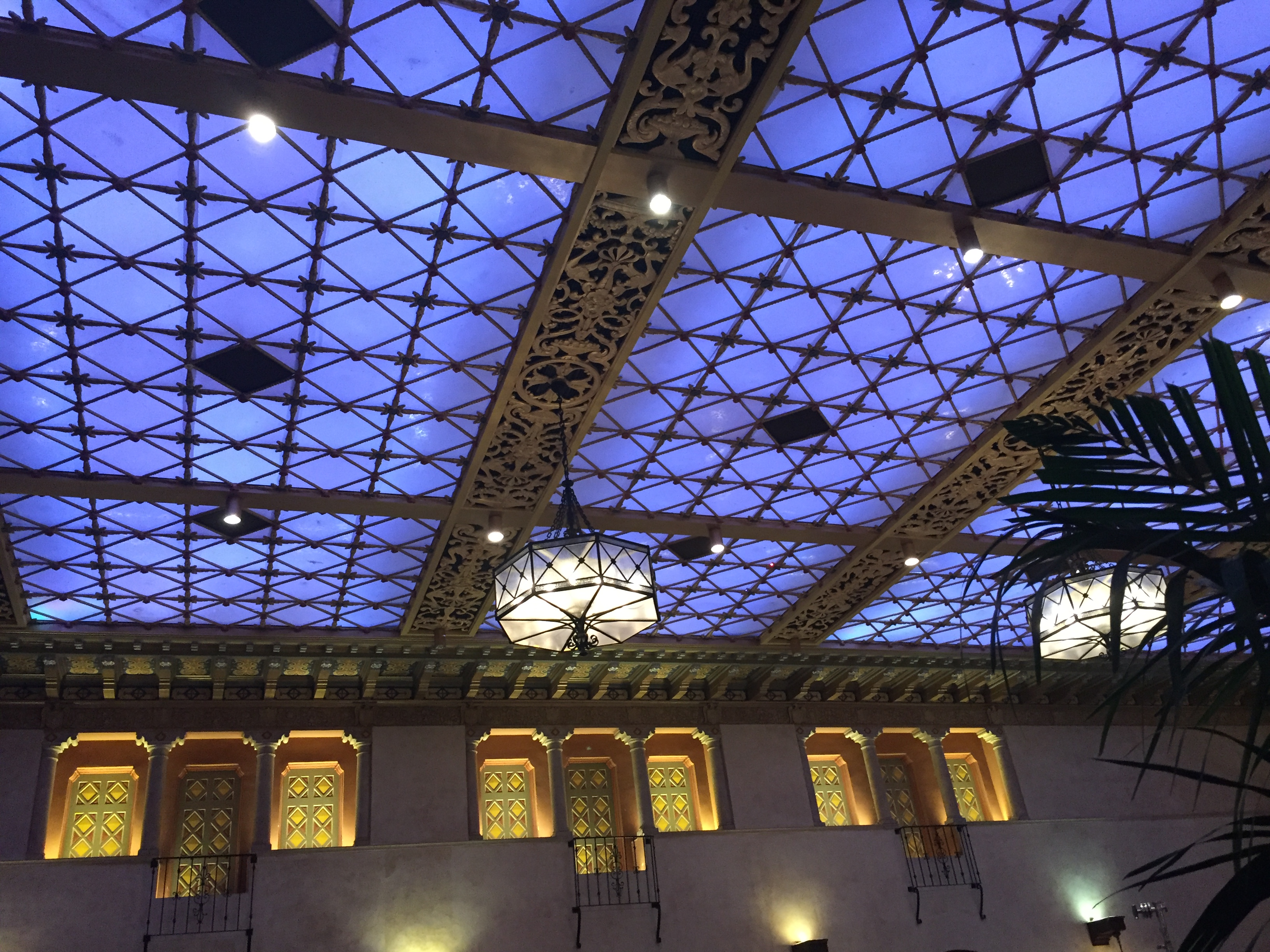
The Blossom Ballroom

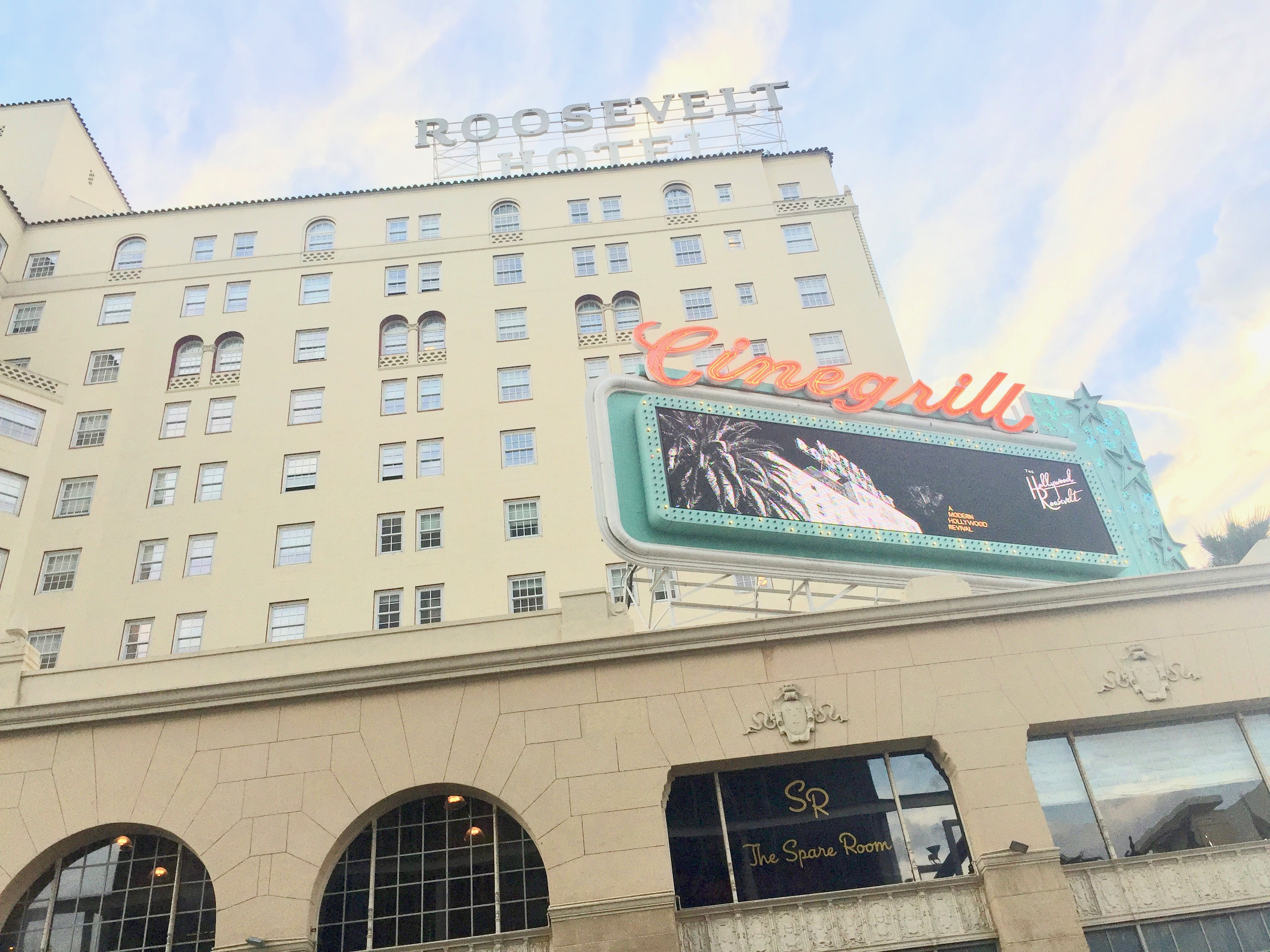
Sign for the Cinegrill

== See also ==
- List of Los Angeles Historic-Cultural Monuments in Hollywood
- List of contributing properties in the Hollywood Boulevard Commercial and Entertainment District
