= The Willmore =

- Willmore, The
- U.S. National Register of Historic Places
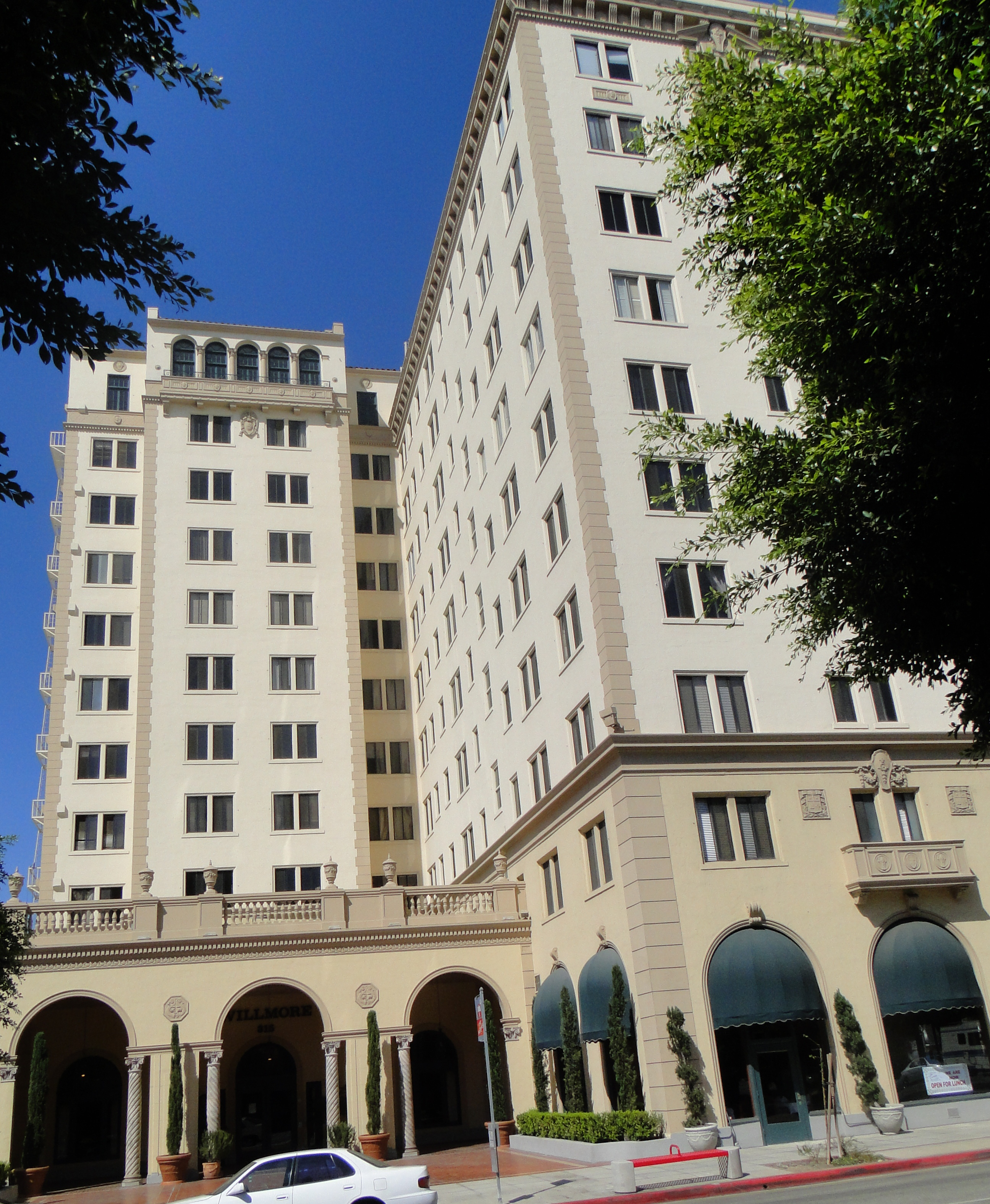
- The Willmore in 2009

- Location within California
- Location: 315 West Third Street, Long Beach, California
- Coordinates: 33°46′15″N 118°11′40″W
- Area: less than one acre
- Built: 1925
- Built by: Trewitt-Shields Company
- Architect: Fisher, Lake and Traver
- Architectural style: Renaissance Revival
- NRHP reference No.: 99000579
- Added to NRHP: May 20, 1999

The Willmore, formerly known as The Stillwell, is a historic apartment building in downtown Long Beach, California. It has been listed on the National Register of Historic Places since May 20, 1999.

== Design ==
The Willmore was designed in the Renaissance Revival style by Fisher, Lake and Traver, the architects of the Hollywood Roosevelt Hotel. It was originally designed as a U-shaped structure. However, only one wing was completed. The building is designed in the Renaissance Revival and Beaux-Arts styles and constructed with reinforced concrete. It has an underground parking garage.

== History ==
Built in 1925 and opened in 1926 by the Trewitt-Shields Company, the structure has an L shape with a ten-story wing and an eleven-story wing.

The building's current name honors William E. Willmore, developer of a forerunner to Long Beach, Willmore City, and namesake of the Willmore neighborhood.

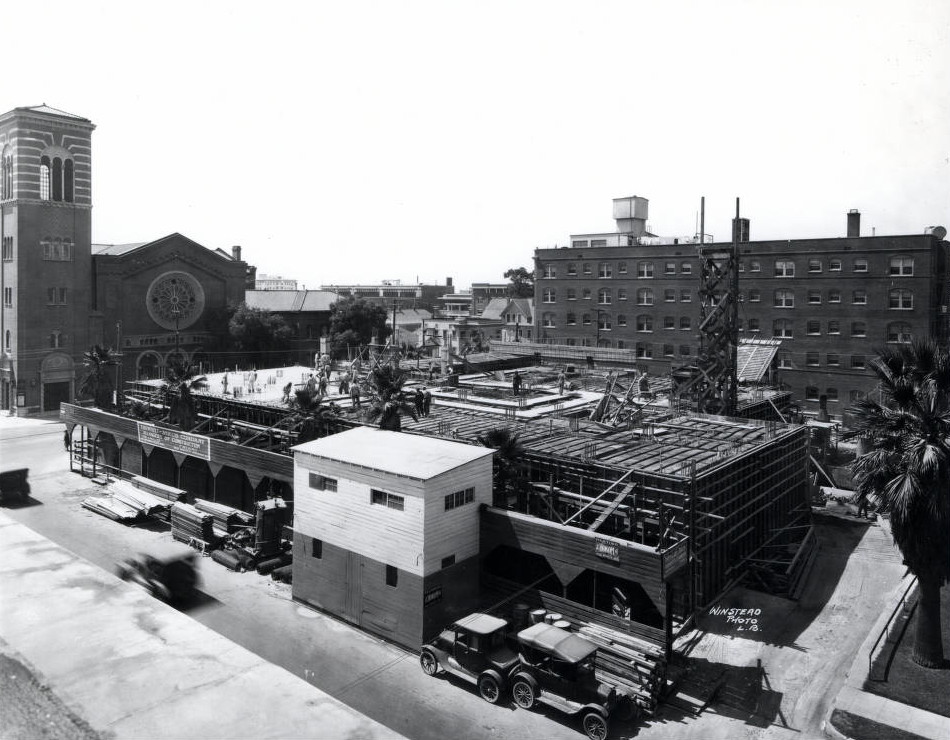
The Stillwell under construction, March, 1925. First Congregational Church in the background.

== See also ==
- List of City of Long Beach Historic Landmarks
